= Randolph family of Virginia =

Prominent political family from Virginia, United States of America

The Coat of Arms of William Randolph

The Randolph family of Virginia is a prominent political family, whose members contributed to the politics of Colonial Virginia, and after the American Revolutionary War, the state of Virginia. They are descended from the Randolphs of Morton Morrell, in Warwickshire, England. The first Randolph in America was Edward Fitz Randolph, who settled in colonial Massachusetts Bay Colony in 1630. His nephew, William Randolph, later came to Virginia as an orphan in 1669. He made his home at Turkey Island along the James River. Because of their numerous progeny, William Randolph and his wife, Mary Isham Randolph, have been referred to as "the Adam and Eve of Virginia". The Randolph family was the wealthiest and most powerful family in 18th-century Virginia.

== History ==
=== Colonial Virginia ===
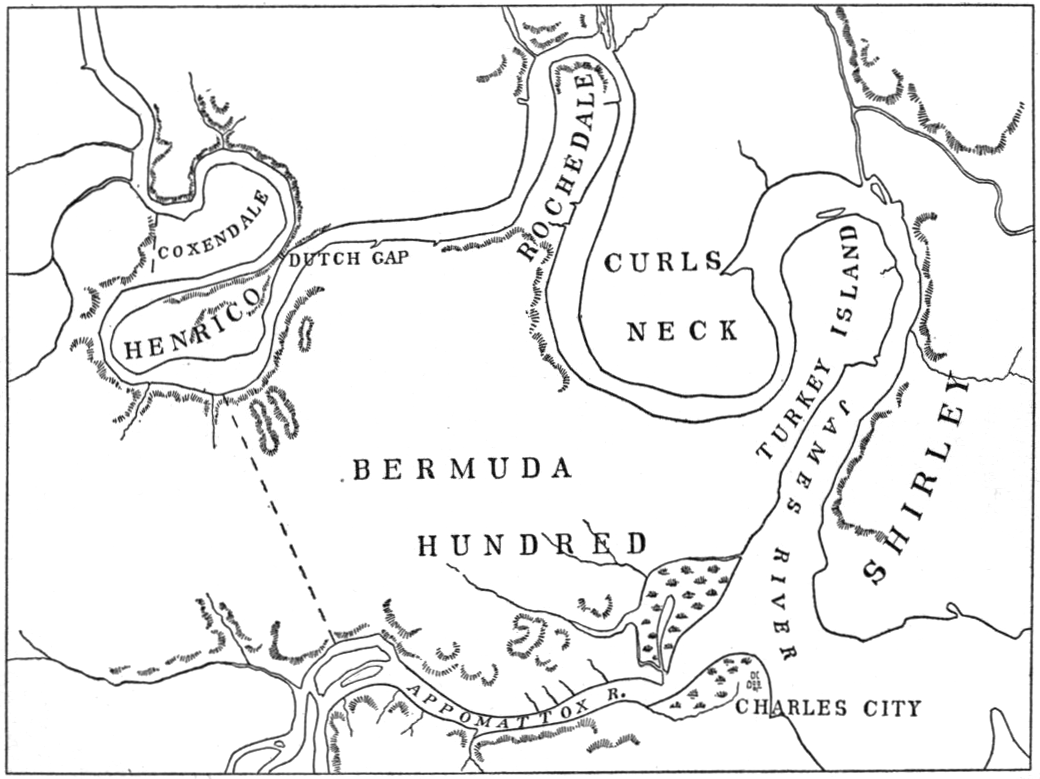
Map showing Bermuda Hundred and other early settlements along the James River

Henry Randolph I (1623-1673), born in Little Houghton, Northamptonshire, England, emigrated to the colony of Virginia in 1642, protege of Sir William Berkeley. Randolph became clerk of the county court, and when Charles Norwood left the colony, Francis Moryson, Speaker of the House of Burgesses, put forth Randoph's name for the position and the House selected him as its clerk. Randolph remained such longer than anyone else in the century.

Randolph also acquired title to land on the north side of Swift Creek in Bermuda Hundred in 1655 and built Swift Creek Mill, considered one of the first gristmills in the United States, about 1663. The mill was located alongside Randolph's plantation. Henry married Judith, the daughter of House Speaker Henry Soane, with whom they had a son, Captain Henry Randolph. Henry Randolph I was the uncle of William Randolph of Turkey Island in Colonial Virginia, whom Henry sponsored to emigrate to Colonial Virginia following a visit to England and Ireland in 1669 or 1670. He was also the half brother of English poet Thomas Randolph. Henry died in Henrico County, Virginia in 1673. William Randolph, nephew of Henry Randolph I, resided in Colonial Virginia by 1672. William was a transatlantic merchant and ran a tobacco plantation. He represented Henrico County at the House of Burgesses and later was House Speaker. He was a founding trustee of the College of William and Mary.

Thomas Randolph of Tuckahoe and William Randolph II, sons of William Randolph, were Virginia Burgesses for Henrico County in 1720 and 1722. Sir John Randolph, son of William Randolph, was a House Speaker, and later Deputy Attorney General for Charles City, Prince George, and Henrico Counties.

=== Revolutionary War era ===
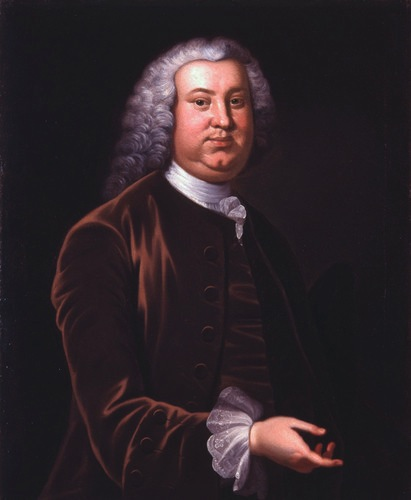
Peyton Randolph (1721–1775), first and third President of the Continental Congress

Peyton Randolph, son of Sir John Randolph, was a speaker of the House of Burgesses, chairman of the Virginia Conventions, and the first President of the Continental Congress. Based his roles in the Continental Congress, Randolph is recognized as a Founding Father of the United States.

Beverley Randolph, grandson of William Randolph, was a Virginia Delegate for Henrico County from 1777 to 1780 and the 8th Governor of Virginia, the first after the U.S. Constitution was ratified.

Edmund Randolph, grandson of Sir John Randolph, was an aide-de-camp to George Washington in the American Revolutionary War. Afterwards, he was the seventh Governor of Virginia, the second U.S. Secretary of State, and the first U.S. Attorney General.

Thomas Jefferson, great-grandson of William Randolph, was a Virginia Burgess for Albemarle County, Virginia, and the principal author of the Declaration of Independence. At the beginning of the American Revolution, he was a delegate to the Continental Congress for Virginia, also serving as a wartime Governor of Virginia. Just after the war ended, from mid-1784 Jefferson served as a diplomat to Paris and became the U.S. Minister to France. He was the first Secretary of State, serving from 1790 to 1793 under George Washington. He was the nation's second Vice President, under John Adams, and the third U.S. President, during which he oversaw the Louisiana Purchase, leading the United States to double in size. In 1819, following his presidency, he founded the University of Virginia.

John Marshall (1755–1835), fourth Chief Justice of the United States Supreme Court

John Marshall, great-grandson of Thomas Randolph of Tuckahoe, was the 4th Chief Justice of the U.S.. His court opinions helped lay the basis for American constitutional law and made the Supreme Court a coequal branch of government along with the legislative and executive branches. Previously, he had been a leader of the Federalist Party in Virginia and served as a U.S. representative. He was Secretary of State under president Adams from 1800 to 1801.

"Light Horse Harry" Lee, 2x great-grandson of William Randolph was an early American patriot who served as the ninth Governor of Virginia and as the Virginia Representative to the United States Congress. During the American Revolution, Lee served as a cavalry officer in the Continental Army.

=== Antebellum era ===
Thomas Mann Randolph Jr., 2x great-grandson of William Randolph, was a member of both houses of the Virginia General Assembly, a U.S. Representative in the U.S. Congress, and as the 21st Governor of Virginia, from 1819 to 1822.

Peyton Randolph, son of Edmund Randolph, served on the Virginia Privy Council and was acting Governor of Virginia from 1811 to 1812.

=== Civil War era ===
Robert E. Lee, 3x great-grandson of William Randolph, was an American career military officer best known for having commanded the Confederate Army of Northern Virginia in the American Civil War. After the war, he was president of Washington College (later Washington and Lee University).

George W. Randolph, 3x great-grandson of William Randolph, was a general officer in the American Civil War and a Confederate States Secretary of War. He was most well known for his strengthening the Confederacy's western and southern defenses, but came into conflict with Confederate President Jefferson Davis over this.

Junius Daniel, 4x great-grandson of William Randolph, was a planter and career military officer, serving in the United States Army, then in the Confederate States Army during the American Civil War, as a brigadier general. His troops were instrumental in the Confederates' success at the first day of the Battle of Gettysburg. He was killed in action at the Battle of Spotsylvania Court House.

=== Modern era ===
Harrison Randolph, 4x great-grandson of William Randolph was President of the College of Charleston from 1897 to 1945.

Armistead C. Gordon, 5x great-grandson of William Randolph was a Virginia lawyer and a prolific writer of prose and poetry.

John Skelton Williams, 2x great-grandson of Edmund Randolph, great-grandson of Peyton Randolph, was Comptroller of the Currency under President Woodrow Wilson.

Edmund Randolph Williams, 2x great-grandson of Edmund Randolph, great-grandson of Peyton Randolph, was a Virginia lawyer

Robert Williams Daniel, 2x great-grandson of Edmund Randolph was a bank executive who served in the Virginia Senate from 1936 to 1940. He is best known for having survived the sinking of the ocean liner RMS Titanic in 1912. His account of the disaster was published in multiple newspapers.

Robert Williams Daniel, Jr., 3x great-grandson of Edmund Randolph was a Virginia farmer, businessman, teacher, and politician who served five terms in the U.S. House of Representatives. While in Congress, Daniel was a member of the House Armed Services Committee and various subcommittees. He later served as deputy assistant to Secretary of Defense, Caspar Weinberger, from 1984 to 1986, and director of intelligence for the Department of Energy from 1990 to 1993. He was a recipient of the National Intelligence Distinguished Service Medal.

Amber House 8x Great-Granddaughter of John Randolph The Tory Ancestry

== Plantations ==
The family's wealth was based on four large plantations on the James River, acquired by William Randolph: Turkey Island (which he began assembling after his arrival around 1668), Curles (purchased from the colonial government), Tuckahoe and Dungeness (the result of two large land grants around 1700).

Turkey Island was given its name by the first explorers of the James River, who noted that it contained a large population of wild turkeys. The term can refer to the surrounding area as well as the island. William Randolph's residence overlooked Turkey Island, and he is buried near the site of the house.

Curles Neck Plantation is west of Turkey Island. It was owned by Nathaniel Bacon, who rebelled against the governor in 1676. The property was forfeited to the colonial government and William Randolph purchased it.

Tuckahoe is the American English name of an edible plant, borrowed from an Algonquian Native American language. It is also the name of several streams and places in eastern Virginia, including Tuckahoe Plantation, established by William Randolph's son, Thomas. "Tuckahoe" later became a pejorative nickname for eastern Virginians, used mainly by western Virginians.

Dungeness is the headland of a shingle beach in Kent, England, which must be rounded to approach the Thames Estuary. The founder of Dungeness Plantation, Isham Randolph, spent several years of his adult life as a ship's captain, and therefore was familiar with the feature.

Bremo was the name for a tract between Turkey Island and Curles plantations. The name comes from a Germanic word meaning "edge", in this case the edge of a river. The root also occurs in the English word "brim". The extant Bremo Plantation was established in the early 19th century in Fluvanna County, far to the west.

These plantations are shown on the 1751 Fry-Jefferson map.

== Historic homes ==
Historic homes associated with the family include Tuckahoe in Goochland and Henrico Counties, the Peyton Randolph House in Williamsburg, the Wilton House Museum and the John Marshall House in Richmond, Monticello near Charlottesville, Stratford Hall in Westmoreland County, Brandon Plantation in Prince George County, and Burgh Westra in Gloucester, Virginia .

== Freed slaves ==
Randolphs who freed slaves and fought Virginia's growing dependence on the "peculiar institution" in the early Republic are less known, but include Ann Cary Randolph Morris, who later married founding father (and anti-slavery advocate) Gouverneur Morris of New York Jacob Randolph of Isle of Wight County, Virginia, freed 13 slaves in 1783.

John Randolph of Roanoke freed nearly 400 slaves in his will, probated in 1833 and upheld more than a decade later.

Richard Randolph (? - 1859) of Greene County, Ohio, in his will probated in 1859, left his entire estate valued at $80,000 to be used to free slaves of the Randolph family and to be expended for their use and benefit. By 1895, $6,646.27 of Richard Randolph's estate remained unclaimed. In response, the Ohio General Assembly passed an act in 1898 that directed the entire $6,646.27 to be transferred to the endowment of Wilberforce University.

== Other connections ==
Members of the Randolph family also intermarried with other prominent Virginia families, including the Blands, Byrds, Carters, Beverleys, Fitzhughs, and Harrisons. Pocahontas was indirectly an ancestress to members of the Randolph family through marriages of Robert Bolling's two granddaughters, Lucille and Jane Bolling. Some evidence suggests that famous American frontiersman, politician and hero Davy Crockett was of Randolph descent. Actor Lee Marvin and actress and producer Kimberley Kates are also Randolph descendants, in her case through her paternal grandmother. World War I fighter ace Hamilton Coolidge was a direct descendant of the marriage of a Randolph to the daughter of Thomas Jefferson.

In 1926, Jessie Harlan Lincoln, the granddaughter of Abraham Lincoln married her third husband, Robert John Randolph of this Randolph family. Her later two marriages did not produce any more children.

== Descendants ==
Family Tree of Descendants of William Randolph
- William Randolph (1650–1711), ∞ 1675 : Mary Isham (1659–1735)
  - William Randolph II (1681–1741), ∞ 1705 : Elizabeth Beverley (1691–1723)
    - Beverley Randolph (1706–1750), ∞ 1736 : Elizabeth Lightfoot
    - Peter Randolph (1708-1767), ∞ 1738 : Lucille Bolling (1719-1767)
      - Ann Bolling Randolph (1747–1805), ∞ 1763 : William Fitzhugh (1741–1809), owner of Chatham Manor
        - Ann Randolph Fitzhugh (1783–1806), ∞ 1800 : William Craik (1761–1814)
        - Mary Lee Fitzhugh (1788–1853), ∞ 1804 : George Washington Parke Custis (1781–1857), owner of Arlington House
          - Mary Anna Randolph Custis (1808–1873), ∞ 1831 : Robert Edward Lee (1807–1870), owner of Arlington House
            - Lee family
      - William Randolph (born 1750), ∞ : Mary Skipwith (1753-1813)
        - Peter Skipwith Randolph (died 1799), ∞ : Elizabeth Southall (1771-1809)
          - William Beverley Randolph (1790-1874), ∞ 1815 : Sarah Rutherfoord (1797-1819)
      - Beverley Randolph, 8th Governor of Virginia (1754–1797), ∞ 1775 : Martha Cocke (born 1753)
        - Lucy Bolling Randolph (1774–1841), ∞ 1792 : William Randolph (1770–1848) (see below)
      - Robert Randolph (1760–1825), ∞ : Elizabeth Hill Carter (1764–1832)
        - Peter Beverley Randolph (1784-1839), ∞ : Lavinia Heth (1788-1815)
          - Ann Randolph (1811-1884), ∞ : William Henry Kennon (1800-1843)
            - William Upshur Kennon (1844-1915), ∞ : Elizabeth Thornton Gilliam (1845-1919)
              - Elizabeth Rodman Kennon (1878-1949), ∞ : Julien Hall Binford (1873-1943)
                - Julien Binford (1908-1997), ∞ : Élisabeth Bollée (1908-1984)
        - Charles Carter Randolph (1790-1863), ∞ 1819 : Mary Anne Fauntleroy Mortimer (1804-1858)
          - Charles Carter Randolph (1846-1925), ∞ 1884 : Sarah Blair McGuire (1855-1919)
            - Charles Carter Randolph (1890-1967)
        - Robert Lee Randolph (1791-1857), ∞ 1830 : Mary Buckner Thurston Magill (1809–1890)
          - Alfred Magill Randolph (1836–1918), ∞ 1859 : Sarah Griffith Hoxton (1840–1923)
            - Eliza Llewellyn Randolph (1862–1910), ∞ 1886 : James Murray Ambler (1856–1934)
              - Sally Hoxton Ambler (1887–1967), ∞ 1915 : James Branson Kempton (1880–1920)
                - James Murray Kempton (1917–1997), ∞ 1942 (div) : Mina Bluethenthal (1919–2010); ∞ : Beverly Gary (1930–1995)
        - Lucy Bolling Randolph (1796–1861), ∞ 1816 : Richard Chichester Mason (1793–1869), owner of Okeley Manor
          - Beverley Randolph Mason (1834–1910), ∞ 1875 : Elizabeth Harrison Nelson (1846–1925)
            - Richard Nelson Mason (1876–1940), ∞ 1925 : Blanche Andrews (1899–1994)
          - Landon Randolph Mason (1841–1923), ∞ 1875 : Lucy Jacqueline Murray Ambler (1848–1918)
            - Lucy Randolph Mason (1882–1959)
          - William Pinckney Mason (1843–1923), ∞ 1873 : Elizabeth Ruthven McGill (1850–1929)
        - Mary Braxton Randolph (1800-1864), ∞ : Hill Carter (1796-1875), owner of Shirley Plantation
          - Robert Randolph Carter (1825-1888), ∞ 1852 : Louise Humphreys, owner of Shirley Plantation
            - Marion Carter (1859-1952), ∞ 1893 : James Harrison Oliver (1857-1928), owner of Shirley Plantation
    - William Randolph III (1710–1761), ∞ 1735 : Anne Harrison (1724–1745)
      - Peyton Randolph (1738–1794), ∞ 1775 : Lucy Harrison (1755–1809)
        - Richard Kidder Randolph I (1781–1849), ∞ 1802 : Anna Maria Lyman (born 1782)
          - Lucy Maria Randolph (1803–1884), ∞ 1825 : Thomas Breese (1793–1846)
            - Kidder Randolph Breese (1831–1881)
          - Elizabeth Ann Randolph (1816–1847), ∞ 1837 : Oliver Hazard Perry, Jr. (1815–1878)
        - Peyton Randolph (1783–1853), ∞ : Anne Browne Innes (1785–1855)
          - James Innes Randolph (1805–1863), ∞ 1828 : Susan Peyton Armistead (1810–1884)
            - Lucy Randolph (1851–1922), ∞ 1880 : Francis Land Galt (1833–1915)
    - Elizabeth Beverley Randolph (1715–1776), ∞ 1736 : John Chiswell (1715–1766), owner of Scotchtown
      - Susan Chiswell (born 1738), ∞ 1759 : John Robinson (1705–1766)
    - Mary Randolph (1718–1777), ∞ 1741 : John Price (1725–1784)
      - Elizabeth Price (1745–1819), ∞ 1762 : George Francis Dabney (1742–1824)
        - Nancy Anne Dabney (1774–1799), ∞ 1792 : Alexander Moore Stuart (1770–1832)
          - Archibald Stuart (1795–1855), ∞ 1817 : Elizabeth Letcher Pannill (1801–1884)
            - James Ewell Brown Stuart (1833–1864), ∞ 1855 : Flora Cooke (1836–1923)
        - Chiswell Dabney (1791–1865), ∞ 1814 : Martha Ann Norvell (1797–1815); ∞ 1816 : Nancy Wythe (born 1797)
          - Sarah Elizabeth Dabney (born 1821), ∞ : John Scarsbrook Langhorne (1819–1886)
            - Chiswell Dabney Langhorne (1843–1919), ∞ 1864 : Nancy Witcher Keene (1848–1903), owner of Mirador
              - Elizabeth Dabney Langhorne (1867–1914), ∞ 1885 : Thomas Moncure Perkins (1861–1914)
                - Nancy Keene Perkins (1897–1994), ∞ 1917 : Henry Field (1895–1918); ∞ 1920 (div 1947) : Arthur Ronald Lambert Field Tree (1897–1976); ∞ 1948 (div 1953): Claude Granville Lancaster (1899–1977), owner of Kelmarsh Hall
                  - Michael Lambert Tree (1921–1999), ∞ 1949 : Anne Evelyn Beatrice Cavendish (1927–2010), owner of Mereworth Castle
                  - Arthur Jeremy Tree (1925–1993)
              - Irene Langhorne (1873–1956), ∞ 1895 : Charles Dana Gibson (1867–1944)
                - Irene Langhorne Gibson (1897-1973), ∞ 1926 : John Josiah Emery, Jr. (1898-1976)
              - Nancy Witcher Langhorne (1879–1964), ∞ 1897 (div 1903) : Robert Gould Shaw II (1872–1930); ∞ 1906 : Waldorf Astor, 2nd Viscount Astor (1879–1952), owner of Cliveden
                - Robert Gould Shaw III (1898–1970)
                - William Waldorf Astor, 3rd Viscount Astor (1907–1966), ∞ 1945 (div 1953) : Sarah Kathleen Elinor Norton (1920–2013); ∞ 1955 (div 1960) : Phillipa Victoria Hunloke (1930–2005); ∞ 1960 : Janet Bronwen Alun Pugh (born 1930)
                  - William Waldorf Astor III, 4th Viscount Astor (born 1951), ∞ 1976 : Annabel Lucy Veronica Jones (born 1948)
                  - Janet Elizabeth Astor (born 1961), ∞ 1991 : Charles Gordon-Lennox, Earl of March and Kinrara (born 1955)
                - Nancy Phyllis Louise Astor (1909–1975), ∞ 1933 : Gilbert James Heathcote-Drummond-Willoughby, 3rd Earl of Ancaster (1907–1983), owner of Grimsthorpe Castle
                  - Nancy Jane Marie Heathcote-Drummond-Willoughby, 28th Baroness Willoughby de Eresby (born 1934)
                - Francis David Langhorne Astor (1912–2001), ∞ 1945 (div 1951) : Melanie Mathilda Elena Hauser; ∞ 1952 : Bridget Aphra Wreford, owner of Manor House
                - Michael Langhorne Astor (1916–1980), ∞ 1942 (div 1961) : Barbara Mary Colonsay McNeill (1926–1980); ∞ 1961 (div 1968) : Patricia David Pandora Clifford (1930–1988); ∞ 1970 : Judith Caroline Traill Innes
                  - David Waldorf Astor (born 1943), ∞ 1968 : Clare Pamela St. John (born 1947)
                    - Rose Nancy Langhorne Astor (born 1979), ∞ 2005 : Hugh Ralph van Cutsem (born 1974)
                  - Georgina Mary Astor (born 1952), ∞ 1973 (div 1979) : Anthony Ramsay (born 1949); ∞ 1979 : Thomas Lorne Nelson (born 1947)
                  - Polly Michael Astor (born 1971), = Dominic Gerard Francis Eagleton West (born 1969)
                    - Martha West (born 1998)
                - John Jacob Astor VII (1918–2000), ∞ 1944 (div 1972) : Ana Inez Carcano y Morra (1918–1992); ∞ 1976 (div 1985) : Susan Eveleigh (died 1997); ∞ 1988 : Marcia de Savary
              - Phyllis Langhorne (1880–1937), ∞ 1917 : Robert Henry Brand, 1st Baron Brand (1878–1963)
              - Nora Langhorne (1889–1955), ∞ 1909 : Paul Phipps (1880–1953)
                - Joyce Irene Phipps (1910–1979), ∞ 1929 : Reginald Pascoe Grenfell (1903–1993)
      - Thomas Price (1754–1836), ∞ 1774 : Barbara Winston (1758–1831)
        - Elizabeth Randolph Price (1784–1873), ∞ 1808 : Charles William Dabney (1786–1833)
          - Robert Lewis Dabney (1820–1898), ∞ 1848 : Margaret Lavinia Morrison (1823–1908)
            - Charles William Dabney (1855–1945), ∞ 1881 : Mary Chilton Sumpter Brent (1861–1925)
  - Thomas Randolph (1683–1729), ∞ 1710 : Judith Churchill (died 1712); ∞ 1712 : Judith Fleming
    - William Randolph III (1712–1746), ∞ 1735 : Maria Judith Page (died 1743)
      - Thomas Mann Randolph (1741–1793), ∞ 1761 : Anne Cary (1745–1789)
        - Mary Randolph (1762–1828), ∞ 1780 : David Meade Randolph (1758–1830) (see below)
        - Elizabeth Randolph (1765-1791) ∞ 1784 : Robert Pleasants, Jr. (1767-1796)
        - Thomas Mann Randolph, Jr., 21st Governor of Virginia (1768–1828), ∞ 1790 : Martha Jefferson (1772–1836)
          - Anne Cary Randolph (1791-1826) ∞ 1808 : Charles Lewis Bankhead (1788-1835)
            - John Warner Bankhead (1810-1896)
            - Thomas Mann Randolph Bankhead (1811-1857)
            - Ellen Wayles Randolph Bankhead (1813-1838)
            - William Stuart Bankhead (1826-1898)
          - Thomas Jefferson Randolph I (1792–1875), ∞ 1815 : Jane Hollins Nicholas (1798-1871)
            - Margaret Smith Randolph (1816–1842), ∞ 1839 : William Mann Randolph (1815–1850)
            - Martha Jefferson Randolph (1817–1857), ∞ 1834 : John Charles Randolph Taylor (1812–1875)
            - Thomas Jefferson Randolph II (1829-1872), ∞ 1865 : Charlotte Nelson Meriwether (1834-1877)
              - Mary Walker Randolph (1866–1957), ∞ 1894 : William Mann Randolph (1869–1944)
            - Jane Nicholas Randolph (1831–1868), ∞ 1854 : Robert Garlick Hill Kean (1828–1898)
              - Lancelot Minor Kean (1856-1931), ∞ 1880 : Elizabeth Tucker "Lizzie" Prescott (1854-1902); ∞ 1911 : Martha Foster Murphy (1879-1966)
                - Jane Randolph Kean (1881-1948) ∞ 1903 : John Samuel Butler, Jr. (1861-1916)
                - Mary Evalina Sanfrosa Prescott Kean (1891-1988) ∞ 1927 : Constant Southworth (1894-1984)
                - Elizabeth Caroline Hill Kean (1896-1969) ∞ 1920 : Raymond Henry Campbell (1893-1969)
                - James Louis Randolph Kean (1913-1988) ∞ 1940 : Mary Louise McCarter (1914-1984)
              - Martha Cary (Pattie) Kean (1858-1939) ∞ 1882 : John Speed Morris (1855-1928)
              - Gen. Jefferson Randolph Kean MD (1860-1950) ∞ 1894 : Louise Hurlbut Young (1877-1915)
              - Robert Garlick Hill Kean (1862-1883)
          - Ellen Wayles Randolph (1796–1876), ∞ 1825 : Joseph Coolidge (1798–1879)
            - Ellen Randolph Coolidge (1826–1894), ∞ 1855 : Edmund Dwight (1824–1900)
            - Joseph Randolph Coolidge I (1828–1925), ∞ 1860 : Julia Gardner (1841–1921)
              - Joseph Randolph Coolidge II (1862–1928), ∞ 1886 : Mary Hamilton Hill (1862–1952)
                - Joseph Randolph Coolidge III (1887–1936), ∞ 1913 : Anna Lyman Cabot (1888–1985)
                  - Joseph Randolph Coolidge IV (1916–1999), ∞ 1952 : Peggy Stuart (1913–1981)
                - Hamilton Coolidge (1895–1918)
              - John Gardner Coolidge (1863–1936), ∞ 1909 : Helen Granger Stevens (1876–1962), owner of Ashdale Farm
              - Archibald Cary Coolidge (1866–1928)
              - Harold Jefferson Coolidge (1870–1934), ∞ 1903 : Edith Lawrence (1879–1975)
                - Harold Jefferson Coolidge, Jr. (1904–1985), ∞ 1931 (div) : Helen Carpenter Isaacs (1907-1982)
                  - Nicholas Jefferson Coolidge (1932-2013), ∞ 1977 (div) : Eliska Haskova (born 1941)
              - Julian Lowell Coolidge (1873–1954), ∞ 1901 : Theresa Reynolds (1874–1972)
                - Jane Revere Coolidge (1902–1996), ∞ 1930 : Walter Muir Whitehill (1905–1978)
          - Cornelia Jefferson Randolph (1799-1871)
          - Virginia Jefferson Randolph (1801–1882), ∞ 1824 : Nicholas Philip Trist (1800–1874)
            - Martha Jefferson Trist (1826-1915)
            - Thomas Jefferson Trist (1828-1890)
            - Dr. Hore Browse Trist (1832-1896) ∞ 1861 : Anna Mary Waring
          - Mary Jefferson Randolph (1803-1876)
          - James Madison Randolph (1806-1834)
          - Dr. Benjamin Franklin Randolph (1808-1871) ∞ 1834 : Sarah (Sally) Carter (1810-1896)
            - Isaetta Carter Randolph (1836-1888)
            - Lewis Carter Randolph (1838-1887)
            - Robert Mann Randolph (1851-1927)
          - Meriwether Lewis Randolph (1810-1837)
          - Septimia Anne Randolph (1814-1887)
          - George Wythe Randolph (1816–1867), ∞ 1852 : Mary Elizabeth Adams Pope (1830–1871)
        - William Randolph (1770–1848), ∞ 1792 : Lucy Bolling Randolph (1774–1841)
          - Thomas Beverley Randolph (1792-1867), ∞ : Maria Barbara Mayer (1794-1859)
            - Lucy Jane Randolph (1819-1871), ∞ : William High Keim (1813-1862)
          - William Fitzhugh Randolph (1796–1859), ∞ 1817 : Jane Cary Harrison (1797–1883)
            - William Eston Randolph (1820–1898), ∞ 1853 : Sarah Lavinia Epes (1833–1860)
              - Epes Randolph (1856–1921), ∞ : Eleanor Taylor (1886–1921)
            - Beverley Randolph (1823–1903), ∞ : Mary Conway Randolph (1825–1905)
              - William Fitzhugh Randolph (1856–1915), ∞ 1881 : Rebecca Rosalie O'Fallon (1861–1935)
                - Percy Charrington Randolph (1898–1958), ∞ 1921 : Jean McNeill Carson (1903–1989)
                  - Beverley Randolph (1923–1958)
        - Anne Cary Randolph (1774–1837), ∞ 1809 : Gouverneur Morris (1752–1816)
          - Gouverneur Morris Jr. (1813–1883), ∞ 1842 : Martha Jefferson Cary (1820–1873); ∞ 1876 : Anna Elliot Morris (1829–1884)
            - Gouverneur Morris III (1844–1897), ∞ 1873 : Henrietta Hine Baldwin (died 1924)
              - Henrietta Fairfax Morris (born 1875), ∞ 1900 : Stephen Bonsal (1865-1951)
                - Philip Wilson Bonsal (1903-1995), ∞ 1929 : Margaret Lockett
              - Gouverneur Morris IV (1876–1953), ∞ 1905 (div 1923) : Elsie Waterbury (born 1886); ∞ 1923 : Ruth Wightman (1893–1939)
            - Anne Cary Morris (1847-1926), ∞ 1892 : Alfred Percival Maudslay (1850-1931)
        - John Mann Randolph (1779–1834), ∞ 1804 : Judith Archer Lewis (1781–1868)
          - William Mann Randolph (1815–1850), ∞ 1839 : Margaret Smith Randolph (1816–1842)
            - Jane Margaret Randolph (1840-1914), ∞ : Edward Clifford Anderson (1839-1876)
              - Margaret Randolph Anderson (1870-1941), ∞ : Abbott Lawrence Rotch (1861-1912)
            - William Lewis Randolph (1842–1892), ∞ 1866 : Agnes Dillon (1846–1880); ∞ : Margaret Randolph Taylor (1843–1898)
              - William Mann Randolph (1869–1944), ∞ 1894 : Mary Walker Randolph (1866–1957)
                - Sarah Nicholas Randolph (1896–1974), ∞ 1919 : Lucian King Truscott (1895–1965)
                  - Lucian King Truscott III (1921-2000), ∞ 1946 : Anne Elizabeth Harloe (1922-1998)
                    - Lucian King Truscott IV (born 1947)
        - Harriet Randolph (1783–1859), ∞ 1803 : Richard Shippey Hackley (1770–1843)
          - Harriet Randolph Hackley (1810–1880), ∞ 1832 : Andrew Talcott (1797–1883)
            - Charles Gratiot Talcott (1834–1867), ∞ 1858 : Theodosia Lawrence Barnard (1838–1923)
              - Lucia Beverly Talcott (1865–1944), ∞ 1890 : Herman Hollerith (1860–1929)
          - Martha Jefferson Hackley (born 1824), ∞ : Richard Dominicus Cutts (1817-1883)
            - Anna Gertrude Cutts (1848-1912), ∞ 1870 : Moorfield Storey (1845-1929)
        - Virginia Randolph (1786–1852), ∞ 1805 : Wilson Jefferson Cary (1783–1823)
          - Wilson Miles Cary (1806–1877), ∞ 1831 : Jane Margaret Carr (1809–1903)
            - Hetty Cary (1836–1892), ∞ 1865 : John Pegram (1832–1865); ∞ 1879 : Henry Newell Martin (1848–1896)
            - John Brune Cary (1840–1917), ∞ 1867 : Frances Eugenia Daniel (1840–1909)
              - Hetty Cary (1871–1943), ∞ 1894 : Reginald Fairfax Harrison (1869–1938)
            - Sydney Carr Cary (1845–1895), ∞ 1885 : Pauline Playford (1862–1887)
              - Gwendolen Playford Cary (born 1886), ∞ : Francis Hunter Potter (1882–1932)
                - Pauline Fairfax Potter (1908–1976), ∞ 1930 (div 1939) : Charles Carroll Fulton Leser (1900–1949); ∞ 1954 : Philippe de Rothschild (1902–1988), owner of Château Mouton Rothschild
          - Mary Randolph Cary (1811-1887), ∞ : Orlando Fairfax (1806-1882)
            - Monimia Fairfax (1837-1889), ∞ : George Davis (1820-1896)
          - Archibald Cary (1815–1854), ∞ 1838 : Monimia Fairfax (1820–1875)
            - Constance Fairfax Cary (1843–1920), ∞ 1867 : Burton Norvell Harrison (1838–1904)
              - Reginald Fairfax Harrison (1869–1938), ∞ 1894 : Hetty Cary (1871–1943)
              - Francis Burton Harrison (1873–1957), ∞ 1900 : Mary Crocker (1881–1905); ∞ 1907 (div 1919) : Mabel Judson; ∞ 1919 (div 1927) : Elizabeth Wrentmore; ∞ 1927 (div 1933) : Margaret Wrentmore; ∞ 1935 (div 1948) : Doria Lee; ∞ 1949 : Maria Teresa Larrucea
                - Barbara Harrison (1904–1977), ∞ 1935 : Lloyd Bruce Wescott (1907–1990)
            - Clarence Cary (1845–1911), ∞ 1878 : Elisabeth Miller Potter (1856–1945)
              - Guy Fairfax Cary (1879–1950), ∞ 1922 : Cynthia Burke Roche (1884–1966)
                - Cynthia Cary (born 1924), ∞ 1947 (div 1972) : Charles Bingham Penrose Van Pelt (1922–2003); ∞ 1976 : Edwin Fariman Russell (1914–2001)
          - Martha Jefferson Cary (1820–1873), ∞ 1842 : Gouverneur Morris Jr. (1813–1883)
    - Judith Randolph (born 1724), ∞ 1744 : William John Stith (1707–1755)
    - Mary Isham Randolph (1718–1772), ∞ 1733 : James Keith (1696–1752)
      - Mary Randolph Keith (1737–1809), ∞ 1754 : Thomas Marshall (1730–1802)
        - John Curtis Marshall (1755–1835), ∞ 1783 : Mary Willis Ambler (1766–1831)
          - Thomas Marshall (1784–1835), ∞ 1809 : Margaret Wardrop Lewis (1792–1829)
            - Fielding Lewis Marshall (1819–1902), ∞ 1843 : Rebecca Frances Coke (1824–1862); ∞ 1867 : Mary Newton (1842–1928)
              - Richard Coke Marshall (1844–1914), ∞ 1865 : Mary Catherine Wilson (1843–1891)
                - Rebecca Coke Marshall (1868–1963), ∞ 1893 : Marion Lewis Marshall (1867–1925)
          - Jaquelin Ambler Marshall (1787–1852), ∞ 1819 : Eliza Letitia Steptoe Clarkson (1798–1868)
            - Eliza Clarkson Marshall (1827-1868), ∞ 1850 : Harrison Robertson (1822-1908)
              - Harrison Robertson (1865-1938), ∞ : Mary Longley Vawter (1867-1944)
                - Harrison Marshall Robertson (1892-1958), ∞ 1917 : Mary MacKenzie (born 1897)
                  - Mary Bowie Robertson (1929-2016), ∞ 1953 : Chapin Carpenter (1928-2011)
                    - Mary Chapin Carpenter (born 1958)
            - Jaquelin Ambler Marshall (1829–1909), ∞ 1856 : Rebecca Peyton Marshall (1833–1895)
              - Marion Lewis Marshall (1867–1925), ∞ 1893 : Rebecca Coke Marshall (1868–1963)
                - Richard Jaquelin Marshall (1895–1973), ∞ : Nell Mutter (1899–1934); ∞ 1935 : Isabel Crum (born 1897)
                  - Harriette Marshall, ∞ : John Eric Olson (1917–2012)
                    - Randy Olson (born 1955)
          - Edward Carrington Marshall (1805–1882), ∞ 1829 : Rebecca Courtenay Peyton (1810–1888)
            - Rebecca Peyton Marshall (1833–1895), ∞ 1856 : Jaquelin Ambler Marshall (1829–1909)
            - James Keith Marshall (1839–1863)
        - Anna Maria Marshall (1757–1824), ∞ 1784 : Humphrey Marshall (1760–1841)
          - Thomas Alexander Marshall (1794–1871)
          - John Jay Marshall (1785–1846), ∞ : Anna Reed Birney (1793–1859)
            - Humphrey Marshall (1812–1872)
        - Thomas Marshall (1761–1830), ∞ 1783 : Susannah Adams (died 1788); ∞ 1790 : Frances Maitland Kennon (1772–1833)
          - Thomas Frances Marshall (1793–1853)
        - James Markham Marshall (1764–1848), ∞ : Hester Morris (1774–1816)
        - Charles Fleming Marshall (1767–1805), ∞ 1787 : Lucy Pickett (1767–1825)
          - Anna Maria Marshall (1788–1823), ∞ 1806 : William Strother Jones II (1743–1845)
            - Frances Lucy Mary Ann Margaret Jones (1808–1890), ∞ 1828 : David Walker Barton (1801–1863)
              - Randolph Jones Barton (1844–1921), ∞ 1870 : Agnes Priscilla Kirkland (1849–1930)
                - Randolph Jones Barton (1871–1955), ∞ 1902 : Eleanor Addison Morison (1881–1956)
                  - Agnes Priscilla Randolph Barton (1906–1973), ∞ 1949 : Samuel Eliot Morison (1887–1976)
          - Alexander John Marshall (1803–1882), ∞ 1827 : Maria Rose Taylor (1808–1844)
            - Charles Marshall (1830–1902)
        - Louis Marshall (1773–1866), ∞ 1800 : Agatha Smith (1780–1844)
          - Thomas Francis Marshall (1801–1864)
        - Nancy Marshall (1781–1860), ∞ 1803 : Joseph Hamilton Daveiss (1774–1811)
      - Elizabeth Keith (1745–1821), ∞ 1766 : Edward Ford (1738–1814)
        - Edward Ford (1780–1868), ∞ : Jane Jackson
          - Julia Ford (1816–1851), ∞ : Edward Randolph Ford (1813–1871) (see below)
        - Charles Fleming Ford (1778–1850), ∞ : Sarah Butler
          - Edward Randolph Ford (1813–1871), ∞ : Julia Ford (1816–1851)
            - Antonia Ford (1838–1871), ∞ 1864 : Joseph Clapp Willard (1820–1897)
              - Joseph Edward Willard (1865–1924), ∞ 1891 : Belle Layton Wyatt (1869–1954)
                - Belle Wyatt Willard (1892–1968), ∞ 1914 : Kermit Roosevelt (1889–1943)
                  - Roosevelt Family
                - Mary Elizabeth Willard (1898-1979), ∞ 1921 : Mervyn Robert Howard Molyneux Herbert (1882-1929)
  - Isham Randolph (1684–1742), ∞ 1717 : Jane Lilburne Susan Rogers (1698–1761)
    - Jane Randolph (1721–1776), ∞ 1739 : Peter Jefferson (1708–1757)
      - Mary Jefferson (1741–1811), ∞ 1760 : John Bolling III (1737–1800)
        - Archibald Bolling (1779–1825), ∞ 1801 : Catherine Payne (1784–1849)
          - Archibald Bolling (1806–1862), ∞ 1835 : Anne Wigginton (1809–1898)
            - William Holcomb Bolling (1837–1899), ∞ 1860 : Sallie Spiers White (1843–1925)
              - Edith White Bolling (1872–1961), ∞ 1896 : Norman Galt (1864–1908); ∞ 1915 : Thomas Woodrow Wilson, 28th President of the United States (1856–1924)
      - Thomas Jefferson, 3rd President of the United States (1743–1826), ∞ 1772 : Martha Wayles (1748–1782); = Sally Hemings (1773–1835), owner of Monticello
        - Martha Jefferson (1772–1836), ∞ 1790 : Thomas Mann Randolph, Jr., 21st Governor of Virginia (1768–1828) (see above)
        - Mary Jefferson (1778–1804), ∞ 1797 : John Wayles Eppes (1773–1823)
          - Francis Wayles Eppes VII (1801–1881), ∞ 1822 : Mary Elizabeth Cleland Randolph (1801–1835); ∞ 1837 : Susan Margaret Ware (1815–1887)
        - Harriet Hemings (1801–1863)
        - Madison Hemings (1805–1877), ∞ 1831 : Mary Hughes McCoy (1808–1867)
          - Ellen Wayles Hemings (1856–1940), ∞ 1878 : Andrew Jackson Roberts (1852–1927)
            - Frederick Madison Roberts (1879–1952)
        - Eston Hemings Jefferson (1808–1856), ∞ 1832 : Julia Ann Isaacs (1814–1889)
          - John Wayles Jefferson (1835–1892)
          - Anna Wayles Jefferson (1836–1866), ∞ : Albert Pearson (1829–1908)
            - Walter Beverly Pearson (1861–1917), ∞ : Helena Snyder (1870–1959)
      - Martha Jefferson (1746–1811), ∞ 1765 : Dabney Carr (1743–1773)
        - Peter Carr (1770–1815), ∞ 1797 : Hester Smith (1767–1834)
          - Dabney Smith Carr (1802–1854)
          - Jane Margaret Carr (1809–1903), ∞ 1831 : Wilson Miles Cary (1806–1877)
        - Dabney Carr (1773–1837), ∞ 1802 : Elizabeth Carr (1779–1838)
      - Lucy Jefferson (1752–1811), ∞ 1769 : Charles Lilburn Lewis (1747–1837) (see below)
      - Randolph Jefferson (1755–1815), ∞ 1780 : Anne Jefferson Lewis (1755–1792) (see below)
    - Mary Randolph (1723–1803), ∞ 1746 : Charles Lewis (1721–1782)
      - Charles Lilburn Lewis (1747–1837), ∞ 1769 : Lucy Jefferson (1752–1811)
        - Judith Archer Lewis (1781–1868), ∞ 1804 : John Mann Randolph (1779–1834) (see above)
      - Anne Jefferson Lewis (1755–1792), ∞ 1780 : Randolph Jefferson (1755–1815)
    - William Randolph (1727–1791), ∞ 1761 : Elizabeth Little
      - Elizabeth Little Randolph (1763–1843), ∞ 1792 : William Isham Eppes (1760–1823)
        - Elizabeth Randolph Eppes (1796–1867), ∞ : Thomas Quinton Stow (1801–1862)
          - Randolph Isham Stow (1828–1878)
          - Augustine Stow (1833–1903)
          - Jefferson Pickman Stow (1830–1908)
      - Thomas Eston Randolph (1767–1842), ∞ 1797 : Jane Cary Randolph (1776–1832)
        - Mary Elizabeth Cleland Randolph (1801–1835), ∞ 1822 : Francis Wayles Eppes VII (1801–1881)
    - Thomas Isham Randolph (1728–1768), ∞ 1768 : Jane Cary (1751–1774)
      - Archibald Cary Randolph (1769–1813), ∞ 1797 : Lucy Burwell (1777–1810)
        - Phillip Grymes Randolph (1801–1836), ∞ 1824 : Mary O'Neale
          - Mary Conway Randolph (1825–1905), ∞ 1847 : Beverley Randolph (1823–1903) (see above)
        - Susan Grymes Randolph (1803-1858), ∞ : Robert Powell Page (1794-1849)
          - Mary Frances Page (1840-1878), ∞ 1867 : John Esten Cooke (1830-1886)
        - Robert Carter Randolph (1807–1887), ∞ 1830 : Lucy Nelson Wellford (1810–1882)
          - Isham Randolph (1848–1920)
      - Mary Isham Randolph (1773–1835), ∞ 1790 : Randolph Harrison (1769–1839)
        - Harrison family of Virginia
    - Dorothea Randolph (1732–1794), ∞ 1751 : John Woodson (1730–1789)
      - Josiah Woodson (1758–1817), ∞ 1778 : Elizabeth Woodson (1759–1797)
        - Mary Woodson (1779–1839), ∞ 1801 : James Wynn Moss (born 1769)
          - Elizabeth Woodson Moss (1804–1873), ∞ 1828 : Daniel Pinchbeck Wilcox (1800–1831); ∞ 1832 : William Henry Ashley (1778–1838); ∞ 1853 : John Jordan Crittenden, 17th governor of Kentucky (1787–1863)
    - Ann Randolph (1732–1824), ∞ 1765 : James Pleasants (1738–1824)
      - James Pleasants, 22nd Governor of Virginia (1769–1836)
    - Susannah Randolph (1738–1806), ∞ 1760 : Carter Henry Harrison I (1736–1793)
      - Harrison family of Virginia
  - Richard Randolph (1686–1741), ∞ : Jane Bolling (1703–1766), owner of Curles Neck Plantation
    - Richard Randolph II (1725–1786), ∞ 1750 : Anne Meade (1725–1814)
      - David Meade Randolph (1758–1830), ∞ 1780 : Mary Randolph (1762–1828)
        - William Beverley Randolph (1790–1868), ∞ 1816 : Sarah Lingan (1794–1877)
          - James Lingan Randolph (1817–1888), ∞ 1848 : Emily Strother (1820–1904)
            - Lingan Strother Randolph (1859–1922)
      - Susanna Randolph (1738–1806), ∞ 1776 : Benjamin Harrison VI (1755–1799), owner of Berkeley Plantation
    - Mary Randolph (1727–1781), ∞ 1744 : Archibald Cary (1721–1787)
      - Anne Cary (1745–1789), ∞ 1761 : Thomas Mann Randolph (1741–1793) (see above)
      - Jane Cary (1751–1774), ∞ 1768 : Thomas Isham Randolph (1728–1768) (see above)
      - Elizabeth Cary (1760-1775), ∞ : Robert Kincaid (1751-1801)
        - Frances Cary Kincaid, ∞ : William Howard
          - Jane Elizabeth Howard, ∞ : Elijah Greene
            - Frances Cary Greene (1831-1897), ∞ : Robert Newton Sledd (1833-1899)
              - Andrew Warren Sledd (1870-1939)
    - Elizabeth Randolph (1736–1773), ∞ 1765 : Richard Kidder Meade (1746–1805)
    - John Randolph (1742–1775), ∞ 1769 : Frances Bland (1752–1788)
      - John Randolph (1773–1833)
  - Henry Randolph (born 1687)
  - John Randolph (1693–1737), ∞ 1718 : Susanna Beverley (1692–1754)
    - Peyton Randolph (1721–1775), ∞ 1746 : Elizabeth Harrison (1723–1783)
    - John Randolph (1727–1784), ∞ 1750 : Ariana Jennings (1730–1801)
      - Edmund Jennings Randolph, 7th Governor of Virginia (1753–1813), ∞ 1776 : Elizabeth Carter Nicholas (1753–1810)
        - Peyton Randolph (1779–1828), ∞ 1806 : Maria Ward (1784–1826)
          - Charlotte Fouchee Randolph (1822–1843), ∞ 1841 : John Gifford Skelton (1815–1889)
            - Maria Ward Skelton (1843–1929), ∞ 1864 : John Langbourne Williams (1831–1915)
              - John Skelton Williams (1865–1926)
              - Cyane Dandridge Williams (1866–1952), ∞ 1890 : Eli Lockert Bemiss (1859–1924)
                - Charlotte Randolph Bemiss (1890–1968), ∞ 1929 : Robert Williams Daniel (1884–1940)
              - Edmund Randolph Williams (1871–1952)
              - Langbourne Meade Williams (1872–1932), ∞ 1898 : Susanne Catherine Nolting (1876–1951)
                - Langbourne Meade Williams, Jr. (1903–1994), ∞ 1930 : Elizabeth Goodrich Stillman (1905–1956); ∞ 1956 : Frances Pinckney Breckinridge
        - Susan Beverley Randolph (1781–1846), ∞ :John Bennett Taylor (1783–1816)
          - John Charles Randolph Taylor (1812–1875), ∞ 1834 : Martha Jefferson Randolph (1817–1857) (see above)
          - Charlotte Randolph Taylor (1814–1895), ∞ 1835 : Moncure Robinson (1802–1891)
        - Lucy Nelson Randolph (1788–1847), ∞ 1811 : Peter Vivian Daniel (1784–1860)
          - Peter Vivian Daniel (1818–1889), ∞ 1846 : Mary Robertson (1815–1890)
            - James Robertson Vivian Daniel (1850–1904), ∞ : Hallie Wise Williams (1859–1937)
              - Robert Williams Daniel (1884–1940), ∞ 1914 (div 1923) : Mary Eloise Hughes (1893–1940); ∞ 1923 (div 1928) : Margery Pitt Durant (1887–1969); ∞ 1929 : Charlotte Randolph Bemiss (1890–1968), owner of Lower Brandon Plantation
                - Robert Williams Daniel, Jr. (1936–2012), owner of Lower Brandon Plantation
    - Mary Randolph (1729–1768), ∞ 1741 : Philip Grymes (1720–1762)
      - Lucy Grymes (1743–1830), ∞ 1762 : Thomas Nelson, Jr., 4th Governor of Virginia (1738–1789)
        - Francis Nelson (1767–1832), ∞ 1792 : Lucy Page (1770–1834)
          - Jane Byrd Nelson (1795–1834), ∞ 1819 : John Page (1792–1853)
            - Edwin Randolph Page (1822–1864), ∞ 1850 : Olivia Alexander (1820–1896)
              - William Nelson Page (1854–1932), ∞ 1882 : Emma Hayden Gilham (1855–1933)
        - Hugh Nelson (1768–1836), ∞ 1799 : Elizabeth Kinloch (1781–1834)
          - Anne Carter Nelson (1804-1858), ∞ 1824 : Thomas Warner Meriwether (1803-1863)
            - Charlotte Nelson Meriwether (1834-1877), ∞ 1865 : Thomas Jefferson Randolph II (1829-1872) (see above)
          - Keating Lewis Simmons Nelson (1819–1898), ∞ 1841 : Julia Ann Rogers (born 1825)
            - Elizabeth Harrison Nelson (1846–1925), ∞ 1875 : Beverley Randolph Mason (1834–1910)
        - Mary Nelson (born 1774), ∞ : Robert Carter (1771–1805)
          - Thomas Nelson Carter (1800–1883), ∞ : Juliet Muse Gaines (1806–1836)
            - Thomas Henry Carter (1831–1908), ∞ : Susan Elizabeth Roy (1834–1900)
              - Juliet Carter (1860–1915), ∞ 1894 : Robert Edward Lee, Jr. (1843–1914)
        - Judith Nelson (1782–1869), ∞ 1804 : Thomas Nelson (1770–1859)
          - Elizabeth Burwell Nelson (1821–1912), ∞ : John Page (1821–1901)
        - Susanna Nelson (1785–1850), ∞ 1806 : Francis Page (1781–1831)
          - John Page (1821–1901), ∞ : Elizabeth Burwell Nelson (1821–1912)
            - Thomas Nelson Page (1853–1922)
      - John Randolph Grymes (1745–1805), ∞ 1778 : Susannah Beverley Randolph (1755–1791)
        - Mary Beverley Grymes (1782–1859), ∞ 1809 : Robert West (1780–1817); ∞ 1823 : Peter Francisco (1760–1831)
          - Anna Maria West (1814–1887), ∞ 1836 : Joseph Carper (1812–1864)
            - Willie Ariana Carper (1845–1906), ∞ 1866 : William Bennett Bean (1835–1915)
              - Robert Bennett Bean (1874–1944)
  - Edward Randolph (1690–1756), ∞ 1715 : Elizabeth Grosvenor (1697–1729)
    - Edward Randolph (1718–1757), ∞ 1745 : Lucy Harrison (1728–1793)
      - Harrison Randolph (1758–1833), ∞ 1779 : Elizabeth Starke (1766–1786)
        - Edward Randolph (1780–1827), ∞ 1805 : Margaret Stephenson Turnbull
          - John Feild Randolph (1825–1880), ∞ : Virginia Dashiell Bayard
            - Harrison Randolph (1871–1954)
    - Elizabeth Randolph (1724–1783), ∞ 1745 : William Yates (1720–1764); ∞ 1783 : Theodorick Bland (1708–1784)
      - William Yates (1749–1789), ∞ 1785 : Elizabeth Booth (1755–1789)
        - Anne Yates (1787–1855), ∞ 1806 : Thomas Gholson, Jr. (1780–1816); ∞ 1818 : George Washington Freeman (1789–1858)
          - William Yates Gholson (1807–1870), ∞ : Martha Anne Jane Taylor (1811–1831)
            - Anne Jane Gholson (1831–1893), ∞ 1853 : Francis Thomas Glasgow (1829–1916)
              - Ellen Anderson Gholson Glasgow (1873–1945)
    - Mary Randolph (born 1729), ∞ : Robert Yates (1715–1761)
      - Catherine Randolph Yates (1760–1831), ∞ 1777 : John Thornton (1740–1780); ∞ 1781 : Robert Wellford (1753–1823)
        - John Spotswood Wellford (1783–1846), ∞ 1807 : Frances Page Nelson (1787–1815); ∞ : Janet Henderson (died 1860)
          - Jane Catherine Wellford (1809–1855), ∞ 1830 : James Parke Corbin (1809–1868)
            - Catherine Carter Corbin (1839–1919), ∞ 1863 : Alexander Swift Pendleton (1840–1864); ∞ 1871 : John Mercer Brooke (1826–1906)
              - Rosa Johnston Brooke (1876–1964), ∞ 1903 : Henry Parker Willis (1874–1937)
        - Beverley Randolph Wellford (1797–1870)
  - Mary Randolph (born 1663), ∞ 1685 : John Stith (1658–1724)
    - John Stith (1698–1758), ∞ 1715 : Elizabeth Anderson (born 1700)
      - Anderson Stith (1724–1768), ∞ 1764 : Joanna Bassett (1739–1817)
        - Bassett Stith (1765–1816), ∞ 1790 : Mary Long (born 1768)
          - Maria Bassett Stith (1792–1836), ∞ 1822 : Joseph John Daniel (born 1784)
            - Mary Long Daniel (1829–1876), ∞ 1854 : George Loyall Gordon (1829–1862)
              - Armistead Churchill Gordon (1855–1931)
          - Martha Stith (1805–1830), ∞ 1825 : John Reeves Jones Daniel (1802–1868)
            - Junius Daniel (1828–1864)
    - William John Stith (1707–1755), ∞ 1744 : Judith Randolph (born 1724)
    - Mary Randolph Stith (born 1727), ∞ : William Dawson (1704–1752)
      - John Dawson (1730–1770), ∞ : Mary Johnston (born 1720)
        - William Johnston Dawson (1765–1796)
  - Elizabeth Randolph (1685–1719), ∞ : Richard Bland (1665–1720)
    - Mary Bland (1704–1764), ∞ 1722 : Henry Lee I (1691–1747)
      - Lee family
    - Elizabeth Bland (born 1706), ∞ 1725 : William Beverley (1696–1756)
      - Robert Beverley (1740–1800), ∞ 1763 : Maria Carter (1745–1817)
        - Robert Beverley (1769–1843), ∞ 1791 : Jane Tayloe (1774–1816)
          - James Bradshaw Beverley (1797–1853), ∞ 1819 : Jane Johns Peter (1800–1863)
            - Elizabeth Beverley (1825–1894), ∞ 1862 : Montgomery Dent Corse (1816–1895)
            - William Beverley (1829–1879), ∞ 1853 : Frances Westwood Gray (1833–1880)
              - James Bradshaw Beverley (1854–1926), ∞ 1880 : Anne Douglas Gray (1860–1928)
                - Anne Douglas Beverley (1887–1964), ∞ 1913 : Harry Flood Byrd, 50th Governor of Virginia (1887–1966)
                  - Harry Flood Byrd (1914–2013), ∞ 1941 : Gretchen Bigelow Thomson (1917–1989)
        - Anna Munford Beverley (1778–1830), ∞ 1795 : Francis Corbin (1759–1821)
          - Francis Porteus Corbin (1801–1876), ∞ 1825 : Agnes Rebecca Hamilton (1805–1894)
            - Elizabeth Tayloe Corbin (1835–1906), ∞ 1854 : Louis Henri Pol Frétard de Dampierre, Viscount de Dampierre (1822–1895)
              - Louis Frétard Charles Henri Richard de Dampierre, 1st Duke of San Lorenzo Nuovo (1857–1906), ∞ 1891 : Jeanne Marie Charlotte Carraby (1872–1922)
                - Roger Richard Charles Henri Étienne de Dampierre, 2nd Duke of San Lorenzo (1892–1975), ∞ 1912 (div 1930) : Vittoria Emilia Ipsicratea Agricola Ruspoli (1892–1982)
                  - Victoire Jeanne Joséphine Pierre Marie Emmanuelle de Dampierre (1913–2012), ∞ 1935 (div 1947) : Infante Jaime Leopoldo Isabelino Enrique Alejandro Alberto Alfonso Víctor Acacio Pedro Pablo María de Borbón y Battenberg, Duke of Segovia, Duke of Anjou (1908–1975); ∞ 1949 : Antonio Sozzani (1918–2007)
                    - Prince Alfonso Jaime Marcelino Manuel Víctor María de Borbón y Dampierre, Duke of Anjou and Cádiz (1936–1989), ∞ 1972 (div 1982) : María del Carmen Martínez-Bordiú y Franco (born 1951)
                      - Prince Francisco de Asís Alfonso Jaime Cristóbal Víctor José Gonzalo Cecilio de Borbón y Martínez-Bordiú, Duke of Bourbon (1972–1984)
                      - Prince Luis Alfonso Jaime Marcelino Manuel Víctor María de Borbón y Martínez-Bordiú, Duke of Anjou (born 1974), ∞ 2004 : María Margarita Vargas Santaella (born 1983)
                    - Gonzalo Víctor Alfonso José Bonifacio Antonio María y Todos los Santos de Borbón y Dampierre, Duke of Aquitaine (1937–2000), ∞ 1983 (div 1983) : María del Carmen Harto y Montealegre; ∞ 1984 (div 1989) : María de las Mercedes Licer y García in 1984; ∞ 1992 : Emanuela Maria Pratolongo; = Sandra Lee Landry
                      - Stephanie Michelle de Borbón (born 1968)
                  - Richard Roger Emmanuel Étienne Pierre de Dampierre, 3rd Duke of San Lorenzo Nuovo (1916–2004), ∞ 1937 : María de las Mercedes de Pedroso y Sturdza (1914–2012)
                  - Yolande Beatrix de Dampierre (1918–1990), ∞ 1940 : Luigi, Count Miani di Angorisin
    - Anna Bland (1712–1770), ∞ 1732 : Robert Munford II (1711–1744); ∞ 1744 : George Currie
      - Robert Munford III (1737–1783)
    - Theodorick Bland (1708–1784), ∞ 1738 : Frances Elizabeth Bolling (1724–1774); ∞ : Elizabeth Randolph (1724–1783)
      - Elizabeth Bland (1739–1778), ∞ 1770 : John Banister (1734–1788)
      - Theodorick Bland (1741–1790)
      - Frances Bland (1752–1788), ∞ 1769 : John Randolph (1742–1775); ∞ 1778 : St. George Tucker (1752–1827)
        - Henry St. George Tucker, Sr. (1780–1848), ∞ 1806 : Anne Evelina Hunter (1789–1855)
          - Nathaniel Beverley Tucker (1820–1890), ∞ 1841 : Jane Shelton Ellis (1820–1901)
            - Beverley Dandridge Tucker (1846–1930), ∞ 1873 : Anna Maria Washington (1851–1927)
              - Henry St. George Tucker (1874–1959)
              - Francis Bland Tucker (1895–1984)
          - John Randolph Tucker (1823–1897), ∞ 1848 : Laura Holmes Powell (born 1829)
            - Henry St. George Tucker III (1853–1932), ∞ 1877 : Henrietta Preston Johnston (1858–1900), owner of Col Alto
        - Nathaniel Beverley Tucker (1784–1851)
    - Richard Bland (1710–1776), ∞ 1729 : Anne Poythress (1712–1758)
      - Elizabeth Bland (1733–1792), ∞ : Peter Poythress (1715–1785)
        - Sarah Bland Poythress (1768–1828), ∞ 1786 : Richard Lee (1726–1795); ∞ 1795 : Willoughby Newton (born 1767)
          - Willoughby Newton (1802–1874), ∞ 1825 : Elizabeth Armistead; ∞ 1830 : Mary Stevenson Brockenbrough (1810–1888)
      - Anne Poythress Bland (1735–1785), ∞ 1760 : John Pryor (1735–1783)
        - Richard Pryor (1768–1817), ∞ : Anne Poythress Bland (born 1770)
          - Theodorick Bland Pryor (1805–1890), ∞ : Lucy Epes Atkinson (1810–1829)
            - Roger Atkinson Pryor (1828–1919), ∞ 1848 : Sara Agnes Rice (1830–1912)
              - Lucy Atkinson Pryor (born 1861), ∞ 1889 : Arthur Page Brown (1859–1896)
              - Francesca Theodora Bland Pryor (born 1868), ∞ 1897 : William de Leftwich Dodge (1867–1935)
        - Luke Pryor (1770–1851), ∞ 1786 : Martha Scott (1770–1802); ∞ 1808 : Anne Batte Lane (1790–1864)
          - John Benjamin Pryor (1812–1890)
          - Luke Pryor (1820–1900)
      - William Bland (1742–1803), ∞ : Elizabeth Yates (born 1740)
        - Anne Poythress Bland (born 1770), ∞ : Richard Pryor (1768–1817)

== See also ==
- First Families of Virginia
- Nottoway Plantation
