= Prentis =

Prentis is a surname. Notable people with the surname include:

- Brooke Prentis (born 1980), Australian Aboriginal Christian leader
- Dave Prentis (born 1950), British trade unionist, General Secretary 2001–2021
- Edmund Prentis (1883–1967), American engineer and art collector
- Edward Prentis (1797–1854), English genre painter
- Henning Webb Prentis Jr. (1884–1959), American industrialist
- John Prentis (c. 1726–c. 1775), mayor of Williamsburg, Virginia from 1759 to 1760
- Joseph Prentis (1754–1809, American politician, Speaker of the Virginia House of Delegates 1786–88
- Richard Prentis (born 1947), South African rugby union player
- Robert R. Prentis (1855–1931), American lawyer, 16th Chief Justice of Virginia 1926–31
- Victoria Prentis (born 1971), British Conservative Party politician, Member of Parliament (MP) for Banbury since 2015
- William Prentis (1699–1765), Virginia merchant

== Fictional characters ==
- Ava Prentis, a character in Nexo Knights
- Prentis (Ninjago), a character in Ninjago

== See also ==
- Prentis Cobb Hale (1910–1996), American entrepreneur
- Prentis Hancock (1942–2025), British actor

== See also ==
- Prentiss
