= Edward Randolph =

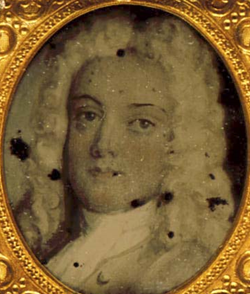

Edward Randolph (~October 1690 – after 1756), sometimes referred to as Edward Randolph of Bremo, was a ship captain, a London tobacco merchant, and the seventh and youngest son of William Randolph and Mary Isham.

== Biography ==
In 1713, Randolph inherited 625 acres of land near the Chickahominy River when his father's will was probated at the Henrico County court in Varina, Virginia. Although known as "Edward Randolph of Bremo", the Virginia Historical Society reported that the Bremo Plantation located along the James River in Henrico County near Malvern Hill and Turkey Island was actually owned by the Cocke family of Virginia during the 18th century. Randolph "chose a seafaring life" and operated merchant vessels between England and the Colony of Virginia. Residing in England, he met an heiress named "Elizabeth" (whose last name has been noted as "Graves", "Groves", and "Grosvenor") from Bristol, England at a launch at Gravesend, Kent. The couple married around 1715 and had four children:

- Joseph Randolph did not marry.
- Edward Randolph (? (Note: One source states that no record of Edward Randolph Jr.'s birth has been found but that he was likely 21 by the time he was listed as a ship's master in 1743.) – April 1757) married Lucy Harrison of Berkeley (the daughter of Benjamin Harrison IV, the sister of Benjamin Harrison V, the sister-in-law of Peyton Randolph and William Randolph III, and the granddaughter of Robert "King" Carter) in the late 1740s and had two children. Harrison's sisters were married to Peyton Randolph and William Randolph III, Edward Randolph Jr's cousins.
- Elizabeth Randolph first married Reverend William Yates, the fifth president of The College of William & Mary, and had three children. She then married Theodorick Bland of Cawsons.
- Mary Randolph married Robert Yates, the brother of William Yates, and had three children.

Two sons of Bartholomew Yates, William and Robert, were members of the Church of England and married the two daughters of Randolph, Elizabeth and Mary, while visiting England to obtain their clerical orders.

Although he came from a large, wealthy, and powerful family, Edward Randolph's children were born into a branch that was not very prosperous. Randolph was bankrupt by 1732 and misfortune had later brought him near poverty. Benjamin Harrison IV was among his many creditors and brought suit against him in 1737.

It is not known where or when Randolph died, but was placed in Virginia as late as 1756 by the Dinwiddie Papers.

== Ancestry and descendants ==
Ancestors of Edward Randolph

16. Robert Randolph
8. William Randolph
17. Rosa Roberts
4. Richard Randolph
18. Richard Lane
9. Dorothy Lane
19. Elizabeth Vincent
2. William Randolph
20. John Rilande
10. Richard Ryland
21. Maria Canning
5. Elizabeth Ryland
11. Elizabeth Harward
1. Edward Randolph
24. Sir Euseby Isham
12. William Isham
25. Anne Borlase
6. Henry Isham
26. William Brett
13. Mary Brett
27. Mary Toddington
3. Mary Isham
28. Christopher Banks
14. Christopher Banks
29. Alice Foxe
7. Catherine Banks
30. John Royall
15. Janet Royall
31. Angeline

In addition to the familial connections noted previously, Randolph was a great-great-great grandfather of Harrison Randolph, the President and Professor of Mathematics at the College of Charleston. He was also a great-uncle of United States President Thomas Jefferson.

== See also ==
- First Families of Virginia
- Randolph family of Virginia
