= John Randolph (politician) =

American politician

Sir John Randolph

31st Speaker of the Virginia House of Burgesses
- In office 1734–1736
- Preceded by: John Holloway
- Succeeded by: John Robinson

Personal details
- Born: c. 1693 Tazewell Hall, Turkey Island, Williamsburg, Virginia, English America
- Died: March 15, 1737 (aged 43–44) Williamsburg, Virginia, British America
- Resting place: Wren Building (Crypt) at the College of William and Mary
- Spouse: Lady Susanna Beverley
- Children: 4, including Peyton and John
- Parent(s): William Randolph; Mary Isham
- Relatives: William Randolph II (brother)
- Education: College of William and Mary
- Occupation: Politician

Sir John Randolph (1693 – March 7, 1737) was an American politician. He was a Speaker of the House of Burgesses, an Attorney General for the Colony of Virginia, and the youngest son of William Randolph and Mary Isham.

== Early life ==
Randolph was born in Charles City County, Virginia. He was the youngest son of William Randolph and Mary (née Isham) Randolph. He was a grand-uncle of U.S. President Thomas Jefferson.

Randolph later reflected, "I should have been an atheist if it had not been for one recollection—and that was the memory of the time when my departed mother used to take my little hand in hers and cause me on my knees to say, 'Our Father who art in heaven.'"

He attended the College of William & Mary and completed his studies in 1711.

== Career ==
In 1712, the Lieutenant Governor of Virginia, Alexander Spotswood, appointed Randolph as Deputy Attorney General for Charles City County, Prince George County, and Henrico County. On May 17, 1715, Randolph was admitted to Gray's Inn at the Inns of Court, then called to the bar on November 25, 1717.

Randolph was the only native of Colonial Virginia to receive a knighthood.

== Personal life ==
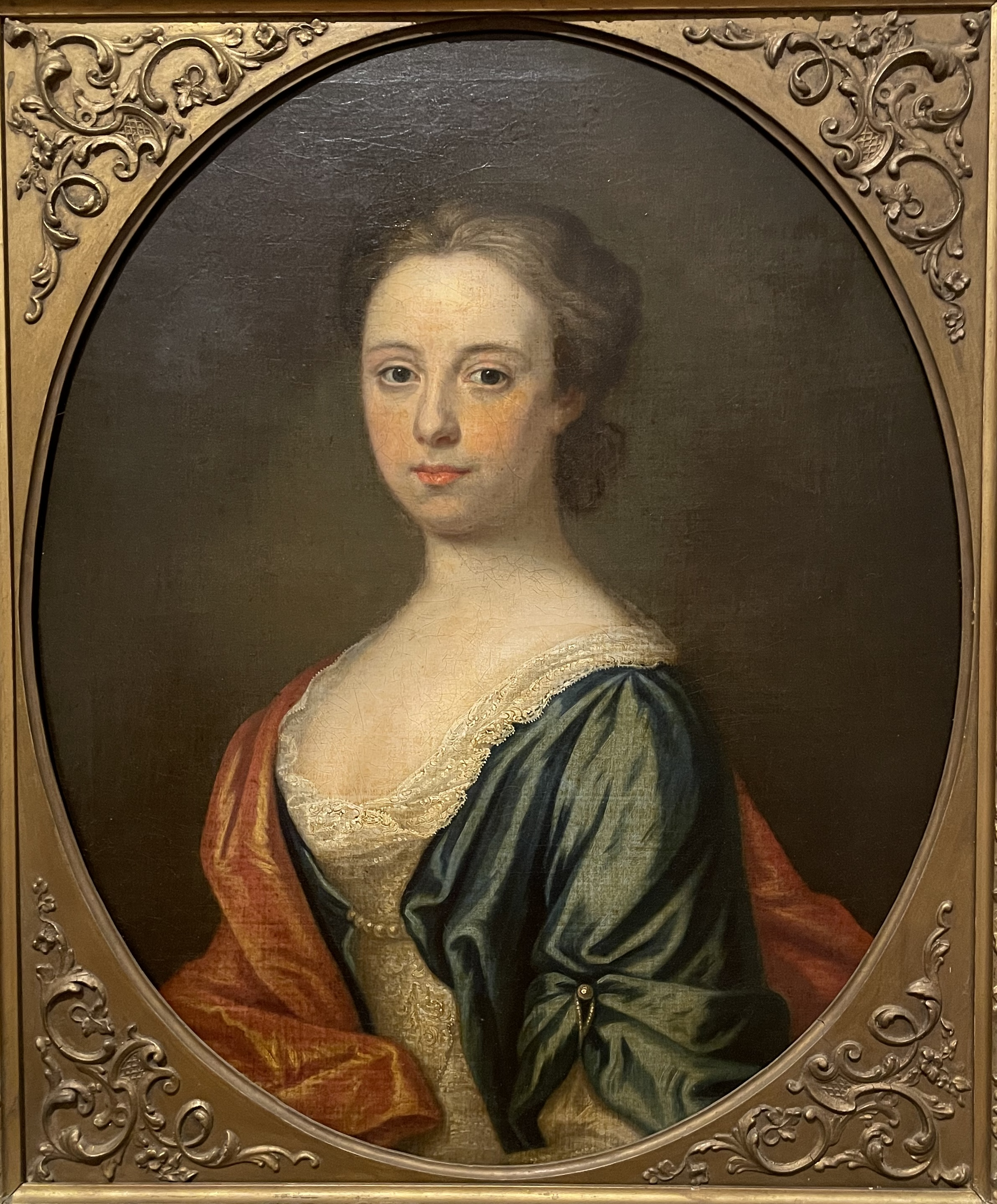
Susanna Beverley Randolph, portrait by John Wollaston

Randolph married Susanna Beverley (the daughter of Peter Beverley, a Speaker of the House of Burgesses and Treasurer of Virginia, and Elizabeth Peyton, and sister of Elizabeth Beverley, the wife of his brother William Randolph II) around 1718. Together, the couple lived at Tazewell Hall, and had at least four children who reached adulthood:

- Beverley Randolph (1719–1764), who married Agatha Wormeley (1721–1786) in 1742.
- Mary Randolph (1720–1768), who married Col. Philip Ludwell Grymes (1721–1761), a member of the Virginia House of Burgesses, in 1742.
- Peyton Randolph (1721–1775), the first and third president of the Continental Congress, who married Elizabeth Harrison.
- John Randolph (1727–1784), who married Ariana Jennings in 1750.

He died in 1737 and was interred at the chapel of the Wren Building at the College of William & Mary. His will had been witnessed in 1735 by Charles Bridges.

== See also ==
- First Families of Virginia
- Randolph family of Virginia

== Ancestry ==
Ancestors of John Randolph (politician)

16. Robert Randolph
8. William Randolph
17. Rosa Roberts
4. Richard Randolph
18. Richard Lane
9. Dorothy Lane
19. Elizabeth Vincent
2. William Randolph
20. John Rilande
10. Richard Ryland
21. Maria Canning
5. Elizabeth Ryland
11. Elizabeth Harward
1. Sir John Randolph
24. Sir Euseby Isham
12. William Isham
25. Anne Borlase
6. Henry Isham
26. William Brett
13. Mary Brett
27. Mary Toddington
3. Mary Isham
28. Christopher Banks
14. Christopher Banks
29. Alice Foxe
7. Catherine Banks
30. John Royall
15. Janet Royall
31. Angeline Roberts Royall
