= David Barton =

David Barton may refer to:

- David Barton (politician) (1783–1837), U.S. senator from Missouri, serving 1821–1831
- David Barton (author) (born 1954), American author, evangelical minister, and political activist
- David K. Barton (1927–2023), American radar systems engineer
- David Walker Barton (1801–1863), Virginia politician
- David Barton (footballer) (born 1959), English footballer
- David Barton (linguist) (1949–2024), British linguist
