= Edmund Randolph =

American Founding Father and statesman (1753–1813)

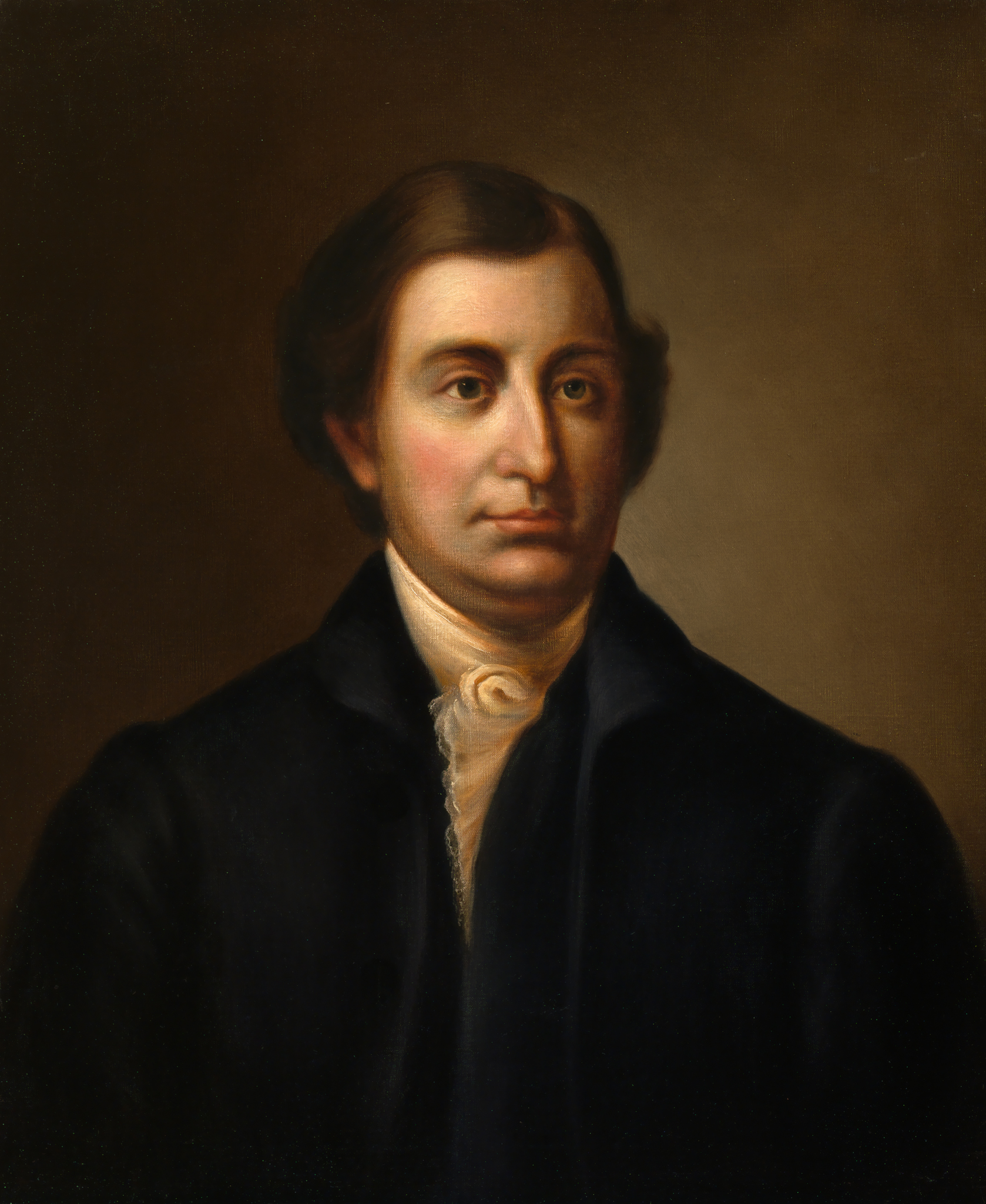
- 1943 portrait of Randolph by C. Gregory Stapko

2nd United States Secretary of State
- In office January 2, 1794 – August 20, 1795
- President: George Washington
- Preceded by: Thomas Jefferson
- Succeeded by: Timothy Pickering

1st United States Attorney General
- In office September 26, 1789 – January 26, 1794
- President: George Washington
- Preceded by: Position established
- Succeeded by: William Bradford

7th Governor of Virginia
- In office December 1, 1786 – December 1, 1788
- Preceded by: Patrick Henry
- Succeeded by: Beverley Randolph

Delegate from Virginia to the Continental Congress
- In office 1779–1782

1st Attorney General of Virginia
- In office July 4, 1776 – November 30, 1786
- Preceded by: John Randolph (for Colonial Virginia)
- Succeeded by: James Innes

Personal details
- Born: Edmund Jennings Randolph; August 10, 1753 Williamsburg, Virginia, British America
- Died: September 12, 1813 (aged 60) Millwood, Virginia, U.S.
- Resting place: Old Chapel
- Party: Federalist
- Spouse: Elizabeth Nicholas (m. 1776; died 1810)
- Children: Peyton Randolph
- Parent: John Randolph
- Relatives: Peyton Randolph (uncle)
- Education: College of William and Mary

Edmund Jennings Randolph (August 10, 1753 – September 12, 1813) was an American Founding Father, attorney, and the seventh Governor of Virginia. As a delegate from Virginia, he attended the Constitutional Convention and helped to create the national constitution while serving on its Committee of Detail. He was appointed the first United States Attorney General by George Washington and subsequently served as the second Secretary of State during the Washington administration.

== Early life ==
Coat of Arms of William Randolph

Edmund Jennings Randolph was born on August 10, 1753, to the influential Randolph family in Williamsburg in the Colony of Virginia. He was educated at the College of William and Mary. After graduation, he began reading law with his father John Randolph and uncle Peyton Randolph.

In 1775, with the start of the American Revolution, Randolph's father, an active Loyalist, fled with his family to Britain. Son Edmund stayed in America, where he joined the Continental Army as an aide-de-camp to General George Washington.

Upon the death of his uncle Peyton Randolph in October 1775, Edmund Randolph returned to Virginia to act as executor of the estate and, while there, was elected as a representative to the Fourth Virginia Convention. He was later mayor of Williamsburg and then attorney general of Virginia, a post he held until 1786. He was married on August 29, 1776, to Elizabeth Nicholas, the daughter of Robert C. Nicholas, and had a total of six children, including Peyton Randolph, Governor of Virginia from 1811 to 1812.

== Political career ==
=== Early political career ===
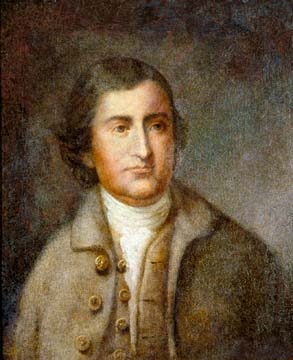
Undated portrait of Randolph

Randolph was selected as one of 11 delegates to represent Virginia at the Continental Congress in 1779 and served as a delegate until 1782. He also remained in private law practice, handling numerous legal issues for Washington and others.

Randolph was elected as Governor of Virginia in 1786. That year, he was a delegate to the Annapolis Convention. He had taken on the young John Marshall as a student and then law partner and transferred his lucrative law practice to Marshall when Randolph became governor since Virginia law barred executive officers from private practice in its courts.

==== Constitutional Convention ====
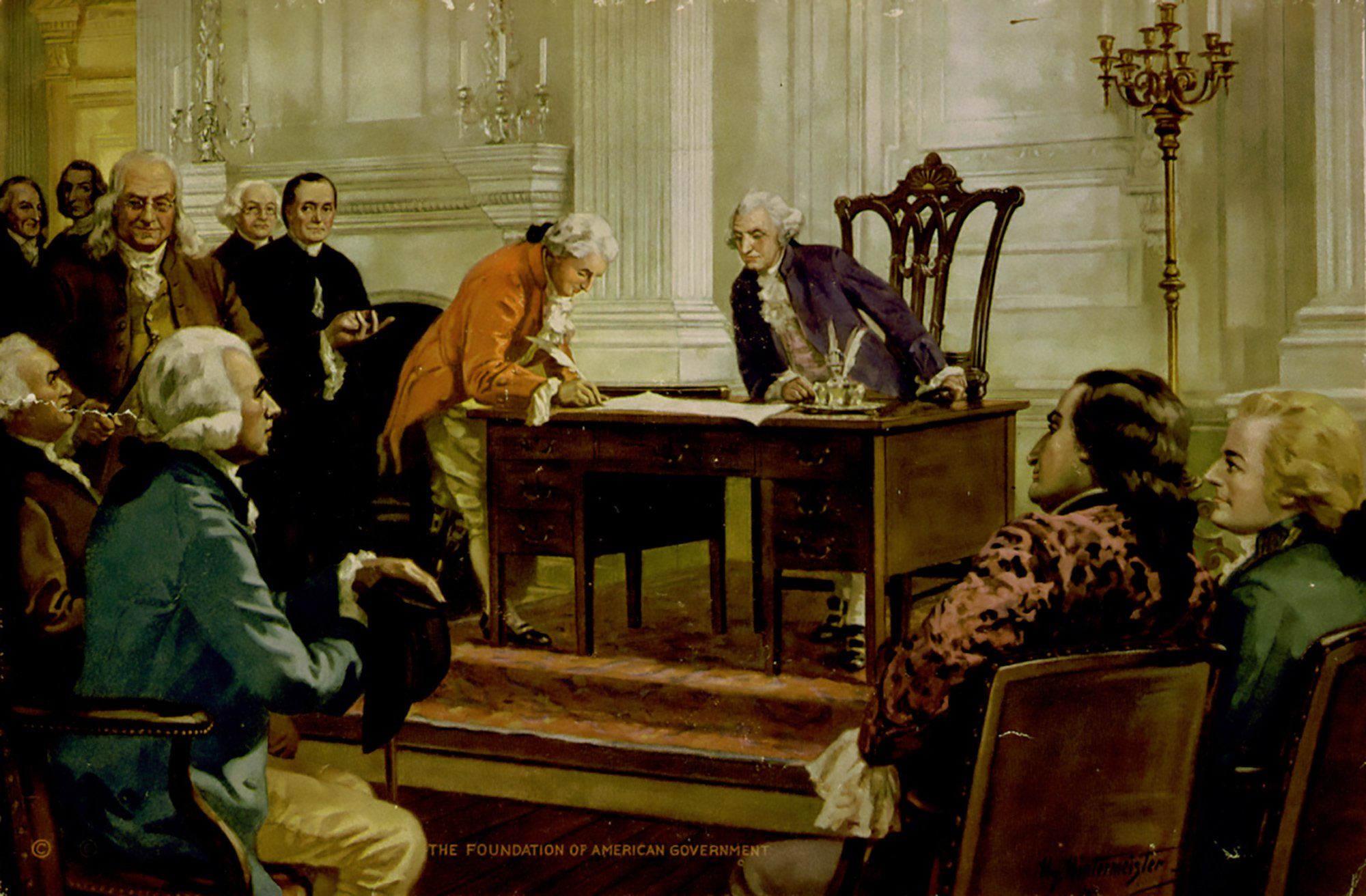
George Washington witnesses Gouverneur Morris sign the constitution as Benjamin Franklin attends (at left; glasses) and Edmund Randolph and Alexander Hamilton look on (far right), in John Henry Hintermeister's 1925 painting, Foundation of the American Government.

The following year, as a delegate from Virginia to the Constitutional Convention, at 34, Randolph introduced the Virginia Plan as an outline for a new national government. Although an enslaver himself, he argued against the further importation of enslaved people from Africa and for a strong central government and advocated a plan for three chief executives from various parts of the country as he was fearful that a single powerful executive would produce an autocracy. The Virginia Plan also proposed a bicameral legislature, both houses of which would have delegates chosen based on state population. Randolph proposed and was supported unanimously by the convention's delegates "that a Nationally Judiciary be established" (Article III of the U.S. Constitution would establish the federal court system). The Articles of Confederation lacked a national court system for the United States.

Randolph was also a member of the "Committee of Detail," which was tasked with converting the Virginia Plan's 15 resolutions to a first draft of the Constitution.

Randolph ultimately refused to sign the final document, one of only three members who remained in the Constitutional Congress but refused to sign (the others were the fellow Virginian George Mason and Elbridge Gerry of Massachusetts). Randolph thought the final document lacked sufficient checks and balances and published an account of his objections in October 1787. He thought that the federal judiciary would threaten state courts, and he considered the Senate too powerful and Congress's power too broad. He also objected to the lack of a provision for a second convention to act after the present instrument had been referred to the states.

==== Role in ratification ====
Randolph served a significant role in the drafting of the original constitution. He helped to propose the Virginia Plan as a delegate from Virginia. This plan was eventually revised into the final draft of the U.S. Constitution. However, Randolph did not sign the Constitution's final draft because he wanted increased protections for individuals and did not agree with all of the revisions made to the original Virginia Plan.

==== Virginia Convention ====
Randolph nevertheless reversed his position at the Virginia Ratifying Convention in 1788; an event held at the Richmond Theatre. He chaired the nearly equally-divided convention, and Mason (as one of the leaders of the opposition, along with Patrick Henry) greatly resented Randolph's change of position. Mason and other opponents demanded amendments before ratification. Randolph noted that he had seen several responses to the insistence that modifications were necessary before ratification. Some thought the objection to be insubstantial because the Constitution provided a process for amendment. In common with other advocates of amending the Constitution before ratification, Randolph insisted that it would be easier to amend the Constitution before its ratification when a majority might do so than to ratify an imperfect Constitution and then to assemble the votes of three-fourths of the states. He did not think the people should become accustomed to altering their constitution with any regularity once it was adopted.

Governor Randolph had written, "If after our best efforts for amendments, they cannot be obtained, I will adopt the constitution as it is." Ultimately, Randolph said he voted for ratification of the Constitution because by June 2, eight other states had already done so, and he did not want to see Virginia left out of the new national government. Randolph believed Virginia must choose between the stark alternatives of ratification and disunion. Randolph never doubted the union's advantages.

In the Richmond Ratification Convention, Randolph ultimately pointed the way to an understanding of ratification with which Virginia's leaders could be satisfied. He assured his fellow members of the Virginia political elite that the Constitution that it was being asked to ratify in the summer of 1788 would have minimal significance and that it would enter more a league of sovereign states than a consolidated union.

Randolph wrote that his tactics swayed five of the ten delegates whose views had been entirely unknown to vote for ratification. Ultimately, Virginia's Federalists secured the Constitution's ratification by precisely five votes.

=== Washington's cabinet ===
President Washington rewarded Randolph for his support. In September 1789, Randolph was appointed the first Attorney General of the United States. Here he maintained a neutrality in the feuds between Alexander Hamilton and Thomas Jefferson (Randolph's second cousin). Serving in Washington's cabinet, as in the ratification dispute of 1787–88, Randolph tried to bring people together rather than contest with others. He continued to make important contributions to the new nation's structure and its relationship with the states.

==== President Washington and the Ona Judge scandal ====
Pennsylvania’s Quakers passed one of the nation's first laws calling for the abolition of slavery. The Gradual Abolition of Slavery Act stated that any adult who resided in Pennsylvania for more than six months would be considered free under Pennsylvania law. During the Washingtons’ time in Philadelphia, three of Randolph’s own slaves cited this very law to him before running away to freedom. As attorney general, Randolph then alerted Martha Washington. At the advise and legal counsel of Randolph, President Washington instructed his personal secretary to secretly ensure that every six months the enslaved persons in the Washington residence should either be rotated out or forced to take a short trip across the river to New Jersey, therefore resetting the clock and skirting the law. This scandal went even further when, in May of 1796, an enslaved woman named Ona “Oney” Judge ran away to freedom while the Washingtons were eating dinner. However, this act angered President Washington, and he enlisted Attorney General Randolph in pursuing Judge. Judge’s recapture was pursued by Washington afterwards.

When Jefferson resigned as Secretary of State in 1793, Randolph succeeded him. The primary diplomatic initiative of his term was the Jay Treaty with Britain in 1794. However, Hamilton devised the plan and wrote the instructions, leaving Randolph the minor role of signing the papers. Hostile to the resulting treaty, Randolph almost gained Washington's ear for his concerns but was overridden in the wake of the Fauchet scandal (see below). Near the end of his term as Secretary of State, negotiations for Pinckney's Treaty were finalized.

==== The Fauchet scandal and resignation ====
A scandal involving an intercepted French message led to Randolph's resignation from Washington's cabinet in August 1795. As Secretary of State, Randolph was tasked with maintaining friendly relations with France. The British Navy had intercepted and turned over to President Washington correspondence from Joseph Fauchet, the French ambassador to the United States, to his superiors. The letters reflected a contempt for the United States for which Randolph appeared primarily responsible, the contents implying that Randolph had exposed the inner debates in Washington's cabinet to the French and had related that the administration was hostile to France. Elkins and McKitrick concluded that, at the very least, there "was something here profoundly disreputable to the government's good faith and character."

Washington immediately overruled Randolph's negative advice about the Jay Treaty. A few days later, Washington handed the minister's letter to Randolph in the presence of the entire cabinet and demanded an explanation. Randolph was speechless and immediately resigned. Chernow and Elkins concluded that France did not bribe Randolph but that he "was rather a pitiable figure, possessed of some talents and surprisingly little malice, but subject to self-absorbed silliness and lapses of good sense."

Randolph's published response, Vindication, illustrates his concerns about public and private perceptions of his character—such concerns for reputation holding great value in the 18th century. In the event, Randolph secured a published retraction from Fauchet.

After his resignation, Randolph was held personally responsible for losing a large sum of money during his administration of the state department. He was eventually adjudged to owe the government more than $49,000, which he paid.

== Marriage to Elizabeth Nicholas ==
Elizabeth Nicholas was a daughter of Robert Carter Nicholas Sr, then the state treasurer of Virginia. Randolph wrote to his children after his wife's death:

"We were both born in the city of Williamsburg, within twelve hours of each other; myself on the 10th of August 1753, and she on the 11th. My aunt Randolph, who saw each of us soon after our birth, facetiously foretold that we should be united in marriage-a circumstance which, improbable at the time from the dissensions of our families, seemed daily to grow into an impossibility from their increasing rancor. In childhood we were taught the elements of reading at the same school... she won me by the best of all graces, cheerfulness, good sense, and benevolence. I do not recollect that I reflected much upon that range of qualities, which I afterwards found to be constituents of nuptial happiness; but Providence seemed to be kinder to me than my most deliberate judgment could have been... I desired nothing more than that she should sincerely persuade herself that she would be happy with me."

They married on August 29, 1776. Their marital relationship was close and so free of friction that his daughters could not forget one singular instance of misunderstanding—Mrs. Randolph having related some particular incident, and her husband hastily exclaimed: "That is mere gossip." The lady repaired to her room and did not answer her husband's gentle knock. Then Randolph said, "Betsey, I have urgent business in town, but I shall not leave this house until permitted to apologize to you." The door opened, and the unprecedented scene ended.

After Mrs. Randolph's death in 1810, the heartbroken husband wrote some account of her and their married life, which was addressed to his children as "the best witnesses of the truth of the brief history." In part, Randolph wrote, "My eyes are every moment beholding so many objects with which she was associated; I sometimes catch a sound which deludes me so much with the similitude of her voice; I carry about my heart and hold for a daily visit so many of her precious relics; and, above all, my present situation is so greatly contrasted by its vacancy, regrets, and anguish, with the purest and unchequered bliss, so far as it depended on her, for many years of varying fortune, that I have vowed at her grave daily to maintain with her a mental intercourse."

== Later life ==
After leaving the federal cabinet, Randolph returned to Virginia to practice law, where he was a leader of the state bar. His most famous case was defending Aaron Burr at his trial for treason in 1807.

In 1791, Randolph was elected to the American Philosophical Society.

== Death and legacy ==
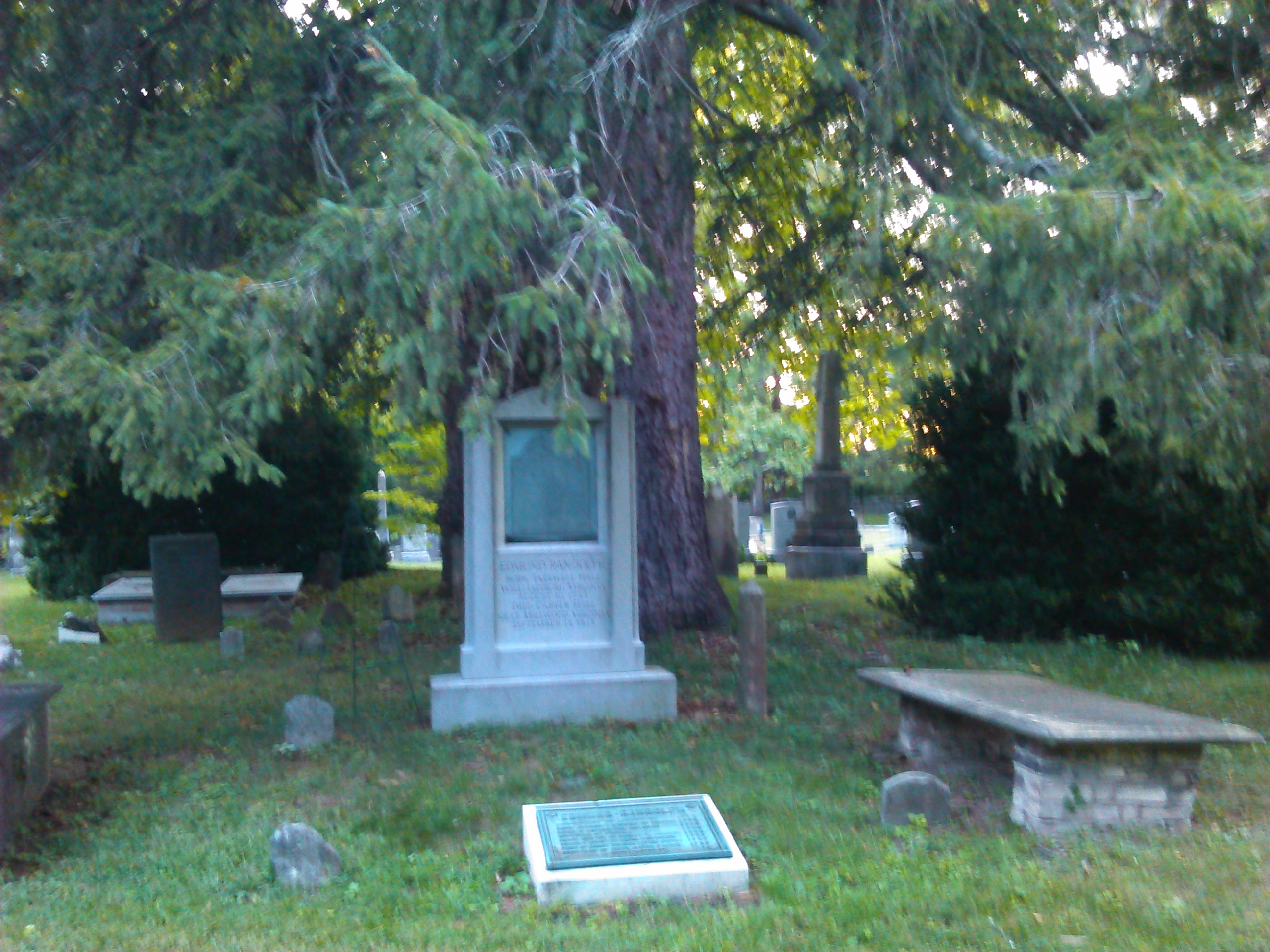
Grave of Randolph

Randolph lived his final years as a guest of his friend Nathaniel Burwell at Carter Hall, near Millwood, Virginia, in Clarke County. He suffered from paralysis in his final years and died at 60 on September 12, 1813. He is buried nearby at the Burwell family cemetery adjacent to "Old Chapel."

Randolph County, Virginia (now West Virginia) was formed in 1787 and named in Randolph's honor. Randolph County, Illinois was also named after him. Randolph, who was the governor of Virginia when the state ceded what was then sometimes called Illinois County, Virginia (a title disputed by Pennsylvania and others) to the new federal government, which created the Northwest Territory. Randolph County's motto is "where Illinois began" because it was one of the first two settled counties in the territory. It contains Kaskaskia, the first seat of Illinois County, which later became the Illinois Territory's capital and ultimately the state's first capital.

The town of Randolph, Vermont is also named after him.

The Edmund J. Randolph Award is the highest award given by the US Department of Justice to persons who make "outstanding contributions to the accomplishments of the Department's mission."

== Sources ==
- Reardon, John J. (1975). Edmund Randolph: a biography. Macmillan. ISBN 978-0026012003. "Edmund Randolph."
- Randolph, Edmund (1855) [1795]. A Vindication of Edmund Randolph (new ed.). Richmond: Charles H. Wynne, printer. "Edmund Randolph." written by himself, with a preface by P.V. Daniel, Jr.
- Randolph, Edmund (1795). Vindication of Mr. Randolph's resignation. Philadelphia: Samuel Harrison Smith.
- An Impartial Statement of The Controversy, Respecting the Decision of the Late Committee of Canvassers, Containing, The Opinions of Edmund Randolph, Esq. Attorney General of The United States, and Several Other Eminent Law Characters. New York: Thomas Greenleaf. 1792.

Political offices
Preceded by Patrick Henry	Governor of Virginia; 1786–1787	Succeeded by Beverley Randolph
Preceded by Thomas Jefferson	United States Secretary of State; 1794–1795	Succeeded by Timothy Pickering
Legal offices
New office	United States Attorney General; 1789–1794	Succeeded by William Bradford
