= George Gilmer Sr. =

American politician (1700–1757)

George Gilmer (1700 – January 15, 1757) served as mayor of Williamsburg, Virginia, from 1746 to 1747.

== Biography ==
Gilmer was born near Edinburgh, Scotland, in 1700. He studied medicine at the University of Edinburgh. In 1731, Gilmer emigrated to Virginia, settling in Williamsburg. In the mid-1730s, Gilmer owned and ran an apothecary in Williamsburg and owned several lots.

He married three times. He first married a Miss Ridgeway and secondly Mary Peachy Walker. His third wife, Harrison Blair, was the daughter of Archibald Blair.

Gilmer died in Virginia on January 15, 1757.

Dr George Gilmer was the great-grandfather of both George Rockingham Gilmer of Georgia and Thomas Walker Gilmer of Virginia.

Preceded by John Holt	Mayor of Colonial Williamsburg, Virginia; 1753–1754	Succeeded by John Randolph
