= Joseph Prentis =

American politician and judge

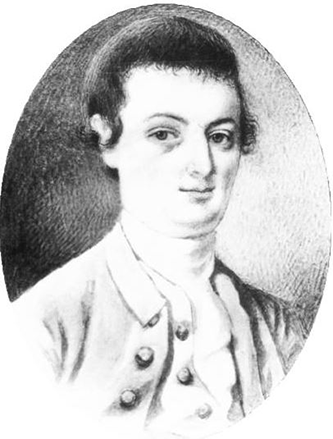

Judge of the General Court
- In office January 4, 1788 – June 18th, 1809

6th Speaker of the Virginia House of Delegates
- In office October 16, 1786 – January 8, 1788
- Preceded by: Benjamin Harrison Jr.
- Succeeded by: Thomas Matthews

Member of the Virginia House of Delegates from York County
- In office 1777–1778
- In office 1782–1788

Member of the Virginia House of Delegates from James City County
- In office 1781–1782

Member of the Virginia House of Delegates from Williamsburg
- In office 1776–1778

Personal details
- Born: January 24, 1754 Williamsburg, Colony of Virginia, British America
- Died: June 18, 1809 (aged 55) Williamsburg, Virginia, U.S.
- Spouse: Margaret Bowdoin (m. 1778; died 1801)
- Children: 8: Joseph Jr. (1783-1851); John Brookes (1789-1848); Elizabeth (1791-1864); Mary Anne (1796-?)
- Parent(s): William Prentis; Mary Brooke
- Relatives: John Prentis (brother)
- Education: College of William & Mary

Joseph Prentis (January 24, 1754 – June 18, 1809) was a Virginia politician. He represented Williamsburg in the Virginia House of Delegates, and served as that body's Speaker from 1786 until 1788. From 1788 until his death, Prentis was a judge in the General Court of Virginia.

== Early life and education ==
Coat of Arms of Joseph Prentis

Joseph Prentis was the youngest son of Williamsburg merchant William Prentis (pre-1720-1765) and his wife, the former Mary Brooke. His great grandfather, also William Prentis (pre-1720-1765), had emigrated to the Virginia Colony from Norfolk County in England, settling in Williamsburg about 1725 and marrying another Mary Brooke, daughter of John and Mary Brooke of York County, Virginia. Although orphaned at the age of 15, Prentis became a ward of lawyer Robert Carter Nicholas, then attended the College of William and Mary in his home town, where he studied law under George Wythe. His elder brother John Prentis succeeded his father operating the store, and served as Williamsburg's mayor (1758-1760) before his death in 1775, when his nephew (this boy's cousin) Robert Prentis took over the family business. That business closed in 1779 because of wartime disruptions.

== Career ==
Prentis was admitted to the Virginia bar and began a private legal practice. However, the American Revolutionary War began his political career. When George Wythe was away representing Virginia at the Continental Congress, Prentis was Williamsburg's other delegate in the Fourth Virginia Revolutionary Convention (of 1775), but was replaced by Edmund Randolph in the Fifth Virginia Revolutionary Convention (and Wythe also returned). Thus he attended the convention session at St. John's Church in Richmond where Patrick Henry delivered the famous words, "Give me liberty, or give me death!".

When the Virginia House of Delegates when was formed in 1776, Prentis again represented Williamsburg. Over the next decade Prentis at various times represented nearby York County (1777–1778, 1782–1788) or James City County (1781-1782) in that body. Fellow legislators elected Prentis a judge of the Court of Admiralty on June 5, 1776, but he resigned the following August 1, and again became a legislator (a part-time position, but one no judge nor executive officer could hold during his legislative service). Prentis became a member of the Virginia Privy Council in 1778, serving under Governor Patrick Henry. Prentis received a special appointment to attend the Session of the House of Delegates on May 7, 1781.

Upon his return to the legislature, Prentis represented York County until his judicial appointment discussed below. During the 1785 session, beginning on October 15, 1785, Prentis chaired the committee which prepared a bill to authorize Virginia's delegates to the Continental Congress to assent to the general regulation of commerce in the United States. In 1786, fellow legislators elected Prentis their Speaker,

On January 4, 1788, they elected him a judge of the General Court of Virginia. Prentis continued as such until his death two decades later. Also, Prentis was one of the revisers of Virginia's legal code in 1792.

== Personal life ==
Prentis married Margaret Bowdoin, the daughter of John Bowdoin of Northampton County on 16 December 1778. The couple had eight children, but only four survived infancy or childhood. One of them, Joseph Prentis Jr. followed his father's path as a lawyer but lived in Suffolk County, Virginia. He married Susan Caroline Reddick, daughter of one-term delegate Robert Moore Reddick and granddaughter of multi-term delegate Willis Riddick of Nansemond County. Joseph Prentis Jr. served many years as clerk for Nansemond county and was a member of the Virginia Constitutional Convention of 1829-1830 (representing, Nansemond, Norfolk and other Hampton Roads counties, long after his father's death).

In 1782 Joseph Prentis Sr. acquired Green Hill plantation, where he and his wife lived for the rest of their lives. Prentis enjoyed gardening and his papers, correspondence and even the naming of his home demonstrate that interest.

The published 1787 tax census does not include Prentis as a taxpayer in either York nor James City county, possibly because legislators were exempt from tax assessment (as normally indicated in the notes). His Williamsburg household included nine people in 1788, probably three of them enslaved.

== Death and legacy ==
Judge Prentis died on the 18th of June in 1809 at the age of 55. In addition to his son Joseph Prentis Jr's many years of service as clerk of Nansemond County mentioned above, his great grandson Robert Riddick Prentis also became a judge of the Supreme Court of Virginia. The Library of the University of Virginia in Charlottesville holds the Prentis family papers.

== See also ==
- Winter, Kari J. (2011). The American Dreams of John B. Prentis Slave Trader. The University of Georgia Press. ISBN 0-8203-3837-0
- Richter, Caroline Julia, "The Prentis Family and their Library" (1985). Dissertations, Theses, and Masters Projects. Paper 1539625287. doi:10.21220/s2-42by-1r17
- Colonial Williamsburg Portrait of Joseph Prentis
