= William Prentis =

18th century US businessman

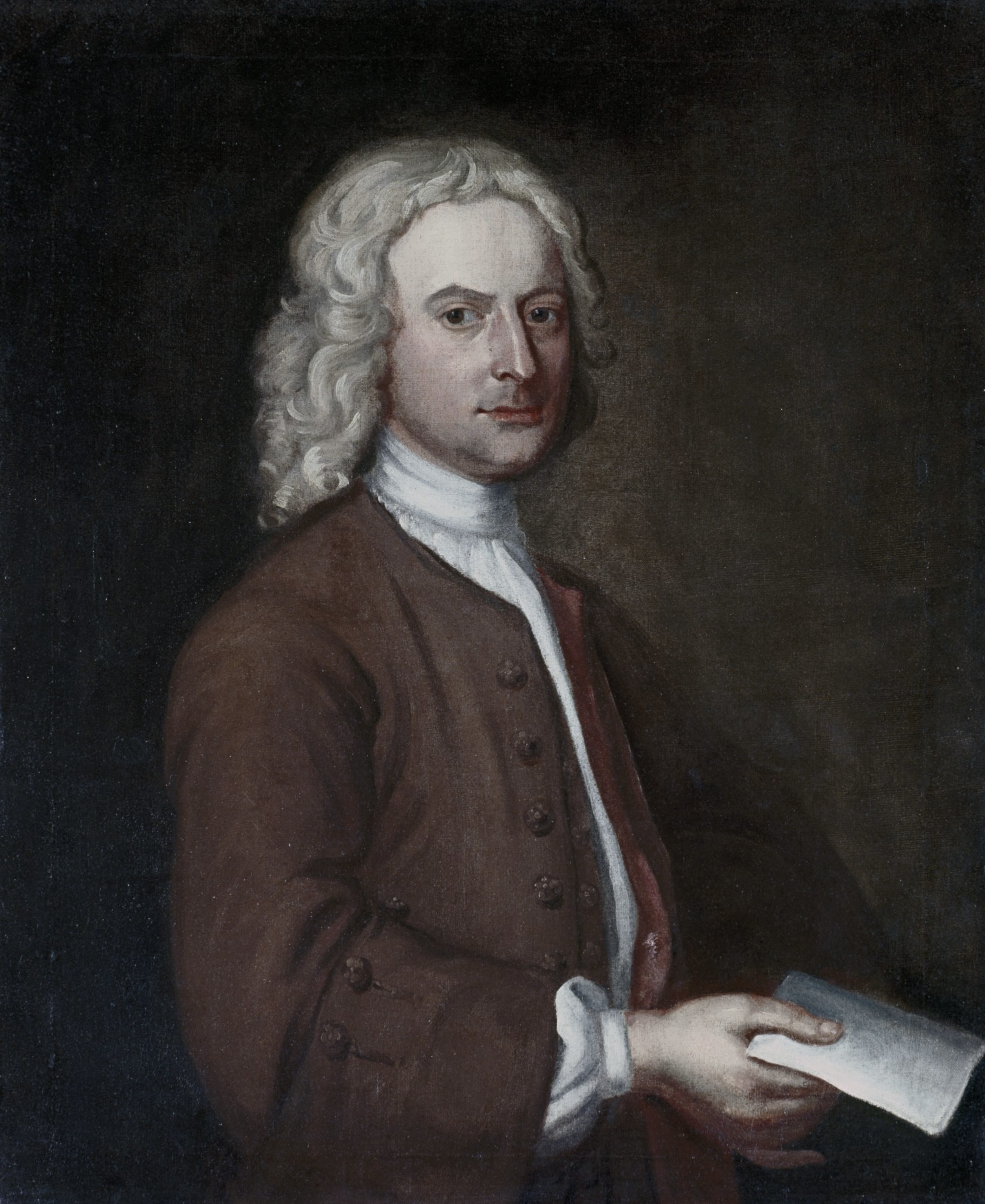
- Portrait attributed to Charles Bridges, c. 1735–1745
- Born: October 10, 1699; England
- Died: August 4, 1765 (aged 65)
- Resting place: Bruton Parish Church
- Occupation: merchant
- Known for: Colonial Williamsburg Prentis Store
- Spouse: Mary Brooke (1701-1768)
- Children: John Prentis (1726-1775); William Prentis (1739-1771); Daniel Prentis (1745-1800); Sarah Prentis Waters (1749-1829); Elizabeth Prentis (1752-1770); Joseph Prentis (1754-1809)
- Parent(s): John and Sarah Prentis

William Prentis (October 10, 1699 – August 4, 1765) was born in England and became the leading merchant of early 18th century Williamsburg, Virginia. He was also the father of John Prentis, who served as mayor of Williamsburg from 1759 to 1760; and Joseph Prentis, who represented Williamsburg in the Virginia House of Delegates, serving as that body's Speaker from 1786 until 1788.

== Biography ==
=== Early life ===
William was not an orphan, yet his widowed father, John Prentis, placed him at Christ's Hospital, London, for the purpose of education which would lead to the widest possible future prospects. He entered that institution in the spring of 1707, and left in 1714/15 about age 15/16 when he emigrated to Williamsburg, Virginia for an indentured apprenticeship.

=== Business ===
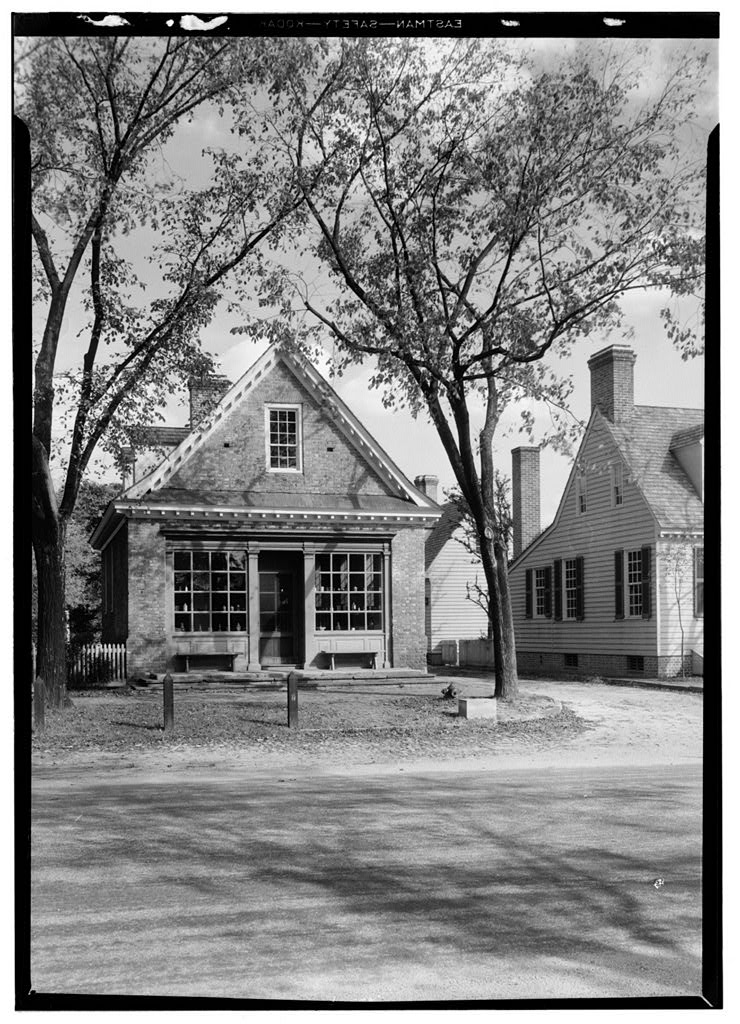
Prentis Store after 1933 and prior to 1972 restoration.

Prentis' seven-year apprenticeship assisting Archibald Blair M.D. in his ordinary store began a successful business career. About 1733 he took over management and purchased shares of that business. At that time, he also renamed the store William Prentis and Company. The enterprise continued to prosper, and when William died in 1765 he was the majority shareholder having one of the largest personal fortunes in Williamsburg. In fact, the store was operated continuously from 1702 to about 1780 when Richmond became the capital of Virginia and trade slowed considerably.

=== Prentis Store building ===
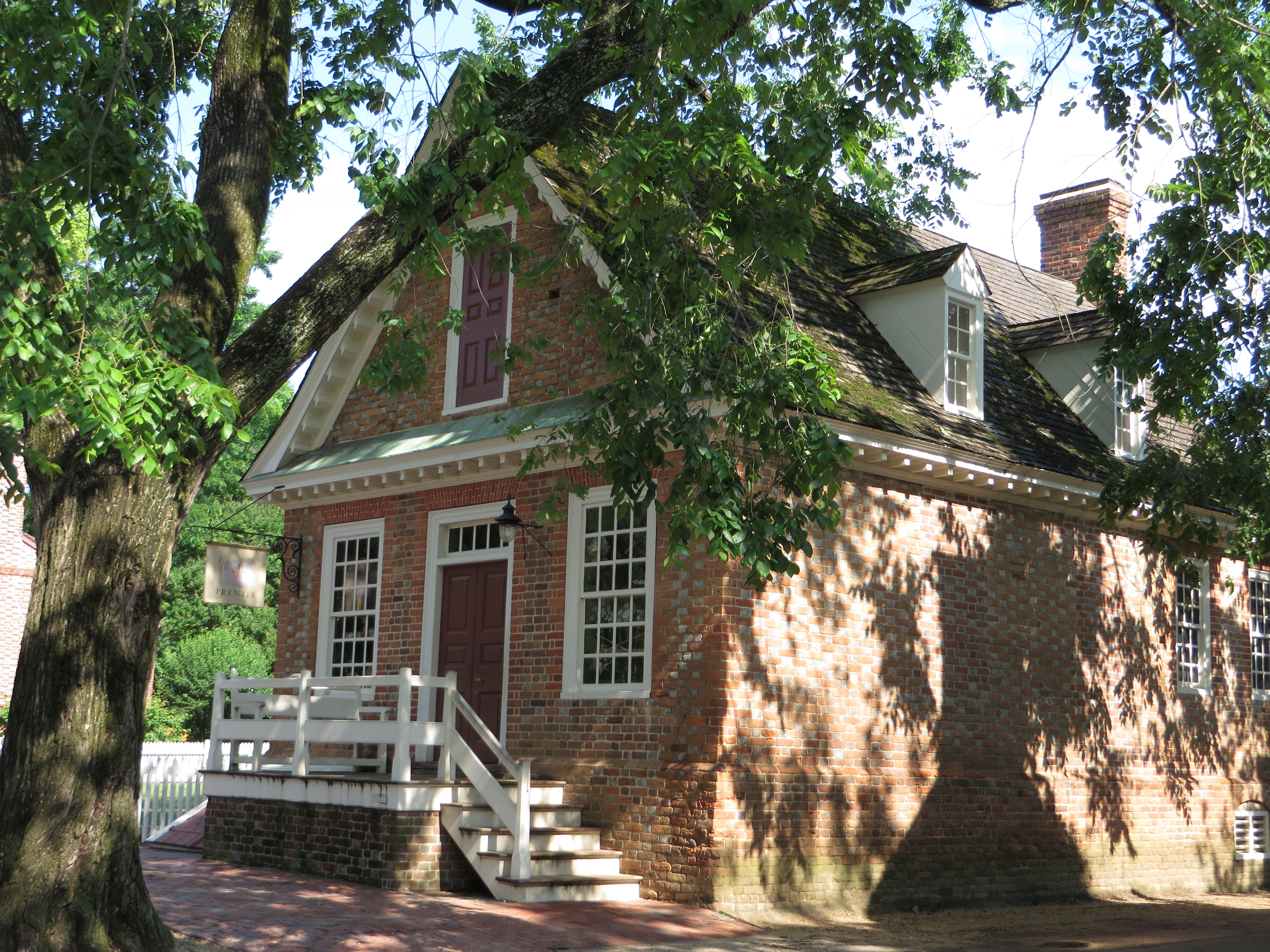
Prentis Store with Restored Entry, Post 1972 Renovation

The Prentis Store is the oldest surviving commercial structure in Williamsburg. Although the enterprise originated with Archibald Blair, it was William Prentis that constructed the brick building which has stood tall on the corner of Duke of Gloucester and Colonial Streets since 1739. Throughout the span of 200 plus years the building housed a variety of businesses, right into the early twentieth century. Now part of Colonial Williamsburg, the initial restoration erased all evidence of previous uses. A further restoration in 1972 returned the building entrance to the original above grade height.

=== Marriage and children ===
William Prentis married Mary Brooke (1701–1768) in 1723. They had six children who lived to adulthood. John Prentis (1726–1775) William Prentis (1739–1771) Daniel Prentis (1745–1800) Sarah Prentis Waters (1749–1829) Elizabeth Prentis (1752–1770) Joseph Prentis (1754–1809)

=== Dwelling ===
The current house now known as the "Prentis House" stands on the north side of Duke of Gloucester Street in Williamsburg near Raleigh Tavern. The lot designated on late eighteenth century plats of the city as "Lot 51" and also "M. Anderson" was originally parceled 14 March 1712 to John Brooke who had 2 years to make improvements. William purchased a portion of Lot 51 from his father-in-law John Brooke. The remainder of the lot was left to his wife upon the death of her father. The original buildings were lost to fire some years after the family sold the property.

== Legacy ==
=== Prentis Award ===
The annual Prentis Award recognizes individuals in the Williamsburg community for their strong civic involvement and support of the College of William and Mary. The award originated in 1980 and is named after William Prentis, and coincidentally to the college name, his wife Mary Prentis (née Brooke). Their son Joseph attended the college in 1777 and was appointed a member of the Board of Visitors in 1791. There was also a Joseph Prentis Jr. who attended the college in 1801 and was appointed a member of the BOV in 1824.

== Bibliography ==
- Winter, Kari J. (2011). The American Dreams of John B. Prentis Slave Trader. The University of Georgia Press. ISBN 0-8203-3837-0
- Richter, Caroline Julia, "The Prentis Family and their Library" (1985). Dissertations, Theses, and Masters Projects. Paper 1539625287. doi:10.21220/s2-42by-1r17
- Hole, Donna C, and Colonial Williamsburg Foundation. Williamsburg's Four Original Stores : an Architectural Analysis / by Donna C. Hole. 1980.
- Loeblich, Natasha K., and Colonial Williamsburg Foundation, Issuing Body. Cross-section Microscopy Analysis of Exterior Paints : Prentis Store, Block 18-1, Building 5 / Natasha K. Loeblich. 2007. Print. Colonial Williamsburg Foundation Library Research Report Ser.; RR-1735.
- Bullock, Helen Duprey. A History of the Prentis House, Colonial Lot #51, Block #17, Site #11 / by Mary A. Stephenson. 1938. Print. Colonial Williamsburg Foundation Library Research Report Ser.; RR-1366.; a detailed history of the lot, its improvements and ownership.
