= William Randolph II =

American politician (1681–1741)

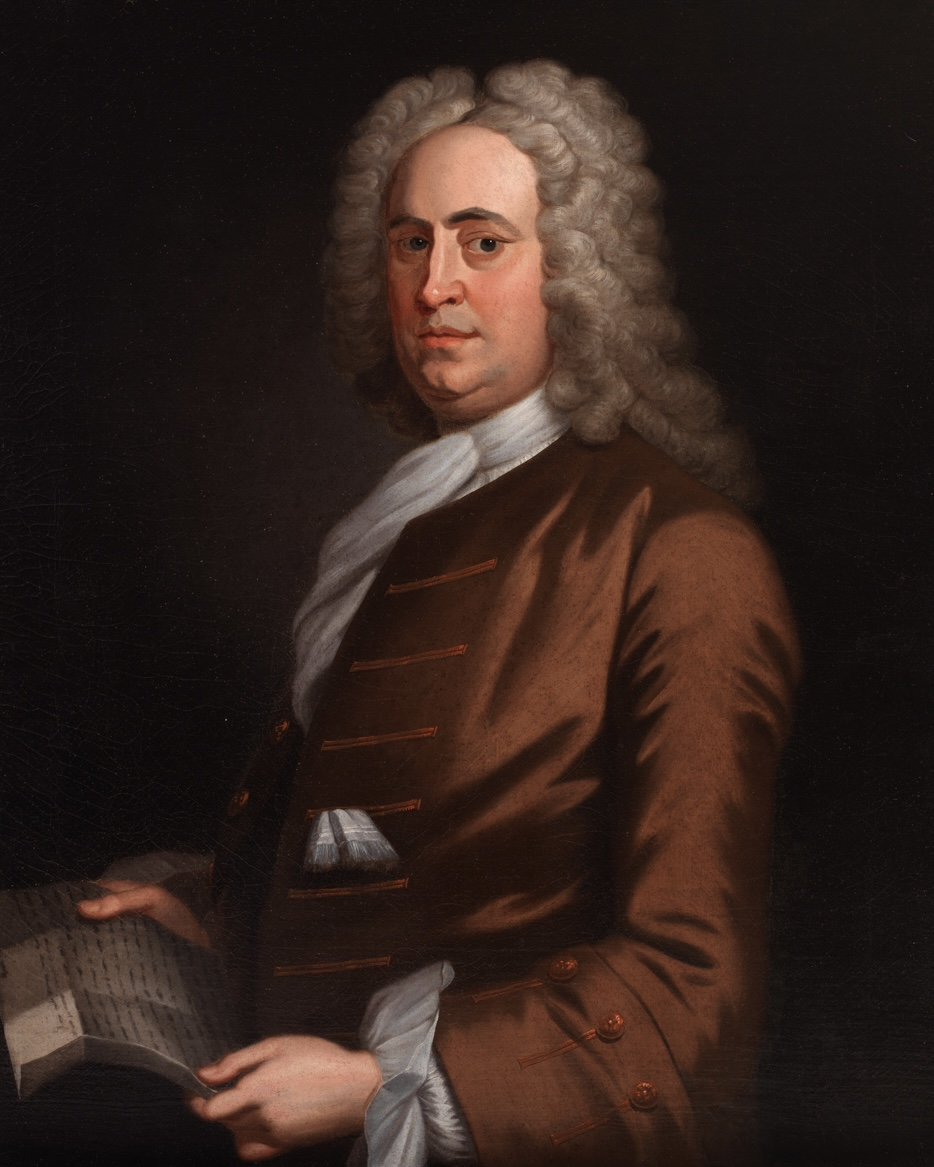
- Portrait by John Wollaston, c. 1755–1758

Treasurer of Virginia
- In office 1737

Personal details
- Born: November 1, 1681 Turkey Island Plantation, Henrico County, Colony of Virginia, British America
- Died: October 19, 1741 (aged 59) Turkey Island Plantation, Henrico County, Colony of Virginia, British America
- Resting place: Turkey Island, Virginia
- Spouse: Elizabeth Beverley
- Children: 7
- Parent: William Randolph (father)
- Relatives: Richard Randolph (brother); John Randolph (brother); Beverley Randolph (grandson); Thomas Jefferson (great-nephew)

William Randolph II (November 1, 1681—October 19, 1741), also known as William Randolph Jr. or Councillor Randolph, was an American planter and politician. He was the treasurer of Virginia and the oldest child of William Randolph and Mary Isham.

== Early life and family ==
Coat of Arms of William Randolph

Randolph was born in November 1681 to William Randolph and wife Mary Isham on the Turkey Island Plantation along the James River in Henrico County, Virginia, and resided there his entire life. He married on June 22, 1709, Elizabeth Peyton Beverley (Gloucester County, January 1, 1691 – December 26, 1723, daughter of Peter Beverley, a Speaker of the House of Burgesses and Treasurer of Virginia, and wife Elizabeth Peyton) around 1705 and the couple had seven children, five of which reached adulthood: (Note: William Randolph II had seven children. Two of his earliest children, Beverely and William, died very young and their names were given to older children.)

- Beverley Randolph (born c. 1706) married Elizabeth Lightfoot and had no children.
- Peter Randolph (born c. 1708 or October 20, 1717-Chatsworth, Henrico County, July 8, 1767), who was appointed Justice in 1741, Clerk of the House of Burgesses and Treasurer of the Colony in 1751, Member of the Council in 1764, Surveyor-General of the Customs for Middle District of North America and Attorney-General of Virginia, married on July 20, 1738 Robert Bolling Jr. and wife Anne Mary Cocke's daughter, Lucille Bolling (May 3, 1719-?). They had four children, including Beverley Randolph, the eighth governor of Virginia and Ann Bolling Randolph Fitzhugh, William Fitzhugh's wife.
- William Randolph III (c. 1710–1762), owner of Wilton plantation house, married Anne Harrison, the daughter of Benjamin Harrison IV, and had eight surviving children.
- Mary Randolph (born c. 1718) married John Price.
- Elizabeth "Betty" Randolph (born c. 1725) married Colonel John Chiswell and had at least four daughters who reached adulthood, including Susan R. Chiswell, the wife of John Robinson, the 32nd Speaker of the House of Burgesses.

Randolph was a great-uncle of United States President Thomas Jefferson.

His brother, Richard Randolph married Major John Bolling's daughter, Jane Bolling, also a lineal descendant of Pocahontas. They had six children.

His brother, John Randolph married Susanna Beverley (daughter of Peter Beverley, Speaker of the House of Burgesses and Treasurer of Colony of Virginia) on July 20, 1738.

== Career ==
Randolph served as Clerk of House from 1703 to 1712. He served as Treasurer of the Colony of Virginia in 1737.

== Ancestry ==
Ancestors of William Randolph II

16. Robert Randolph
8. William Randolph
17. Rosa Roberts
4. Richard Randolph
18. Richard Lane
9. Dorothy Lane
19. Elizabeth Vincent
2. William Randolph
20. John Rilande
10. Richard Ryland
21. Maria Canning
5. Elizabeth Ryland
11. Elizabeth Harward
1. William Randolph II
24. Sir Euseby Isham
12. William Isham
25. Anne Borlase
6. Henry Isham
26. William Brett
13. Mary Brett
27. Mary Toddington
3. Mary Isham
28. Christopher Banks
14. Christopher Banks
29. Alice Foxe
7. Catherine Banks
30. John Royall
15. Janet Royall
31. Angeline

== Westham, Virginia ==
The town of Westham, Virginia was established on land that had been owned by Randolph. When Randolph died, his son Beverley inherited Westham Plantation and planned to create the town of Westham on part of it to facilitate trade in the Piedmont region of Virginia. After Beverley's sudden death, Peter Randolph inherited his brother's land and completed work on the project – renaming the town "Beverley" in honor of his older brother – with help from William Cabell and Peter Jefferson. Jefferson was one of a number of important Virginians, including Carter Braxton, Joshua Fry, John Hunter, Robert Rose, and William Stith. who purchased lots in the new town. Peter Randolph eventually sold Westham Plantation to his younger brother, William, who in turn sold the property to William Byrd III.

== See also ==
- First Families of Virginia
- Randolph family of Virginia
