= John Randolph (loyalist) =

American lawyer

Mayor of Williamsburg, Virginia
- In office 1755–1756
- Preceded by: George Gilmer
- Succeeded by: John Prentis
- In office 1771–1772
- Preceded by: James Blair Jr.
- Succeeded by: Thomas Everard

Personal details
- Born: 1727 Williamsburg, Colony of Virginia
- Died: January 31, 1784 (aged 57) Brompton, London, England
- Resting place: College of William and Mary
- Children: Edmund Randolph
- Parent: Sir John Randolph (father)
- Relatives: Peyton Randolph (brother)
- Occupation: Lawyer, politician
- Known for: American Loyalist

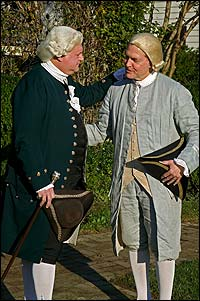
Loyalist John Randolph and his brother Peyton portrayed by Charles Redd and Jack Flintom

John Randolph (1727 – January 31, 1784) was an American lawyer and politician from Williamsburg in the British colony of Virginia. He served as king's attorney for Virginia from 1766 until he left for Britain at the outset of the American Revolution.

== Early life ==
Coat of Arms of William Randolph

Randolph was born in Williamsburg into one of the most prominent families of Virginia. His father was Sir John Randolph, the only colonial Virginian to be knighted. The younger Randolph was a close friend of Thomas Jefferson, his cousin, with whom he often played violin.

== Revolution ==
During the revolutionary crisis, Randolph remained a Loyalist, unlike his brother Peyton Randolph, and his son, Edmund Randolph. In 1774, he wrote "Considerations on the Present State of Virginia", in which he called for reconciliation between his fellow colonists and Great Britain.

He boycotted the Virginia Convention, an extralegal convening of the House of Burgesses headed by his brother Peyton. When hostilities began, Randolph fled to Scotland with Governor Dunmore. In Scotland, Randolph continued to promote reconciliation between Great Britain and the colonies.

== Personal life ==
On July 26, 1750, he married Ariana Jennings (c. 1727–1808) in Annapolis, Maryland. Together, they had three children.

- Edmund Jennings Randolph (1753–1813), who married Elizabeth Nicholas (1753–1810), daughter of Robert Carter Nicholas Sr.
- Susanna Beverly Randolph (1755–1791), who married John Randolph Grymes (1745–1805).
- Ariana Jennings Randolph (1760–1794), who married James Wormeley (1746–1830).

When Randolph died in Brompton, London, in 1784, his last request was to be buried in Virginia. His remains were returned and he is interred in the chapel at The College of William and Mary in Williamsburg. His son Edmund became Governor of Virginia, the first Attorney General of the United States, and the second US Secretary of State.

=== Descendants ===
His grandson, John Randolph Grymes (1786–1854), was a New Orleans attorney, member of the Louisiana state legislature, U. S. attorney for Louisiana district, and aide-de-camp to General Andrew Jackson during the Battle of New Orleans.

His great-granddaughters through his grandson, Ralph Randolph Wormeley (1785–1852), included Elizabeth Wormeley Latimer (1822–1904), and Ariana Randolph Wormeley (1833–1922), was married to Daniel Sargent Curtis (1825–1908), a lawyer and banker and Trustee of the Boston Public Library, director of the Boston National Bank and owner of Palazzo Barbaro.

== Ancestry ==
Ancestors of John Randolph (loyalist)

16. William Randolph
8. Richard Randolph
17. Dorothy Lane
4. William Randolph
18. John Ryland
9. Elizabeth Ryland
2. Sir John Randolph
20. William Isham
10. Henry Isham
21. Mary Brett
5. Mary Isham
11. Catherine Banks
1. John Randolph
12. Robert Beverley
6. Peter Beverley
3. Susanna Beverley
14. Robert Peyton
7. Elizabeth Peyton

Preceded by George Gilmer	Mayor of Williamsburg, Virginia; 1755–1756	Succeeded by John Prentis
Preceded by James Blair, Jr.	Mayor of Williamsburg, Virginia; 1771–1772	Succeeded by Thomas Everard
