= Beverley Randolph (aviator) =

- Born: January 20, 1923; Millwood, Virginia, US
- Died: April 4, 1958 (aged 35); Patuxent River, Maryland, US
- Military career
- Allegiance: United States of America
- Branch: United States Navy
- Service years: 1945-1956
- Rank: Lieutenant Commander
- Nickname: Bev
- Awards: Air Medal; Navy Commendation Medal

Beverley Randolph (January 20, 1923 – April 4, 1958) was a decorated Naval Aviator in the United States Navy, most noted for sacrificing his life to steer his disabled Grumman F-11 away from a neighborhood, saving the people below.

During the Korean War, Randolph flew over 23 combat missions with VF-154.

== Career ==
=== U.S. Naval Academy Midshipman ===
Randolph was a member of the Battalion Track and Bowling teams and the Reception Committee. In 1945, he graduated in the centennial year of the Academy.

=== Naval Aviator ===
Randolph received his "wings of gold" as a Naval Aviator in 1947. He attended the United States Naval Test Pilot School at the Naval Air Test Center, NAS Patuxent River, Maryland with TPS Class 16, the same class as Vice Admiral William Porter Lawrence.

=== Test pilot and accident ===
A letter from Captain F.B. Gilkerson to Randolph's parents addresses the events of the accident. The letter states that findings are based on circumstantial evidence derived from the wreckage, witness interviews, and transcribed tape from radio transmissions. The findings are as follows:

About five minutes before the crash, Bev reported to the control tower and requested landing instructions. About two minutes later he reported in a very calm voice that he had an "indication" of fire in the afterburner section of the airplane. The tower cleared him to land on runway 6 and asked his position. Bev reported that he was 4 miles East and the tower offered runway 31 if desired. Bev said he would try to get in on runway 6. The first indication that anyone had of real trouble came about a minute later when Bev reported that he was going to be short.

From the investigation we have found that there was no actual fire and that the engine had been secured. We are convinced that Bev felt that he could make the field in a "flameout" (no power) landing. By the time he realized he could not make the runway he was over a housing area. He was high enough to eject at this point but he elected to ride the plane into the trees rather than endanger the people below

== Awards and decorations ==

Naval Aviator insignia
1st row	Air Medal w/ 2 award star		
2nd row	Navy Commendation Medal	Navy Unit Commendation w/ 1 service star	American Defense Service Medal
3rd row	American Campaign Medal	Asiatic-Pacific Campaign Medal	World War II Victory Medal
4th row	Navy Occupation Service Medal	China Service Medal	National Defense Service Medal
5th row	Korean Service Medal w/ 2 service stars	United Nations Service Medal	Republic of Korea Presidential Unit Citation

Legacy
A street in the Conrad Heights neighborhood of Patuxent River Naval Air Station is named in his honor.

== Family history ==
Randolph's parents and grandparents were from Virginia. His parents were Percy Charrington Randolph and Jean McNeil Carson.
