= Harrison Randolph =

American mathematician and administrator

President of the College of Charleston
- In office 1897–1945
- Preceded by: Henry Elliott Shepherd
- Succeeded by: George Daniel Grice

Personal details
- Born: December 8, 1871 New Orleans, LA
- Died: 1954 (aged 82–83)
- Education: University of Virginia

Harrison Randolph (December 8, 1871 – 1954) was the 13th President and professor of mathematics at the College of Charleston from 1897 to 1945.

Randolph was born in New Orleans, Louisiana to John Feild Randolph and Virginia Dashiell Randolph, née Bayard. He was a lineal descendant of Edward Randolph of the Bremo Plantation, who was his great-great-great grandfather and Benjamin Harrison V, a paternal ancestor who signed the Declaration of Independence. He attended the University of Virginia, graduating in 1892 with a Master of Arts degree, and continued graduate study there from 1892 through 1895 while also serving as an instructor in mathematics. During this time he also served as the organist at the just-completed University Chapel and directed the Virginia Glee Club, leading the latter organization on tours through the Southeast. Randolph had been elected President of the University of Arkansas in 1892, but declined the position. In 1895, he was elected chair of Mathematics at the University of Arkansas, remaining there until 1897.

== College of Charleston ==
In 1897, Randolph was elected president and Chair of Mathematics at the College of Charleston. When he arrived, the college principally enrolled students from the city of Charleston, South Carolina. Under his presidency, the student body population changed as he led the building of residence halls and created scholarships to attract students from throughout South Carolina. He also oversaw the admission of women to the college in 1917. Under his leadership, the college grew from 68 students in 1905 to more than 400 in 1935.

Randolph was a member of Phi Beta Kappa and Alpha Tau Omega.

In August 2008, Charleston Magazine named Randolph the 72nd most influential individual in Charleston's history, citing his work to modernize the College of Charleston.
