= David Walker Barton =

American politician

David Walker Benjamin Barton (1801 – July 7, 1863) was an American politician.

== Life ==
Barton graduated from Yale College in 1821. He was a lawyer by profession, and had been a member of the Virginia Legislature. He was an earnest opponent of the southern secession, and his death is said to have been occasioned by the domestic distress which the American Civil War produced. He died in Winchester, Virginia, July 1863, aged about 61 years.
