= Peyton Randolph =

Founding Father of the United States (1721–1775)

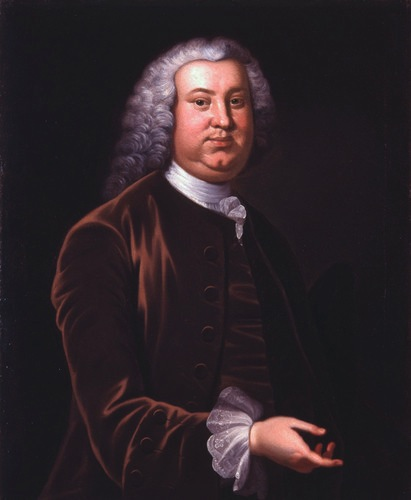
- Portrait by John Wollaston, c. 1755–1758

1st and 3rd President of the Continental Congress
- In office May 10, 1775 – May 24, 1775
- Preceded by: Henry Middleton
- Succeeded by: John Hancock
- In office September 5, 1774 – October 22, 1774
- Preceded by: Office established
- Succeeded by: Henry Middleton

Delegate from Virginia to the Continental Congress
- In office September 5, 1774 – October 22, 1775
- Preceded by: Office established
- Succeeded by: Carter Braxton

33rd Speaker of the Virginia House of Burgesses
- In office 1766–1775
- Preceded by: John Robinson
- Succeeded by: Office abolished

Member of the Virginia House of Burgesses representing College of William & Mary
- In office 1752–1752
- Preceded by: position created

Member of the Virginia House of Burgesses representing Williamsburg
- In office 1758–1776
- Preceded by: John Chiswell
- Succeeded by: position abolished

Member of the Virginia House of Burgesses representing College of William & Mary
- In office 1752–1758
- Preceded by: Beverley Randolph
- Succeeded by: George Wythe

Member of the Virginia House of Burgesses representing Williamsburg
- In office 1748–1752
- Preceded by: John Harmer
- Succeeded by: Armistead Burwell

Personal details
- Born: September 10, 1721 Williamsburg, Colony of Virginia, British America
- Died: October 22, 1775 (aged 54) Philadelphia, Pennsylvania, British America
- Resting place: Wren Chapel, College of William & Mary, Williamsburg, Virginia
- Spouse: Elizabeth Harrison
- Relations: Thomas Jefferson (cousin)
- Parent: John Randolph (father)
- Education: College of William & Mary

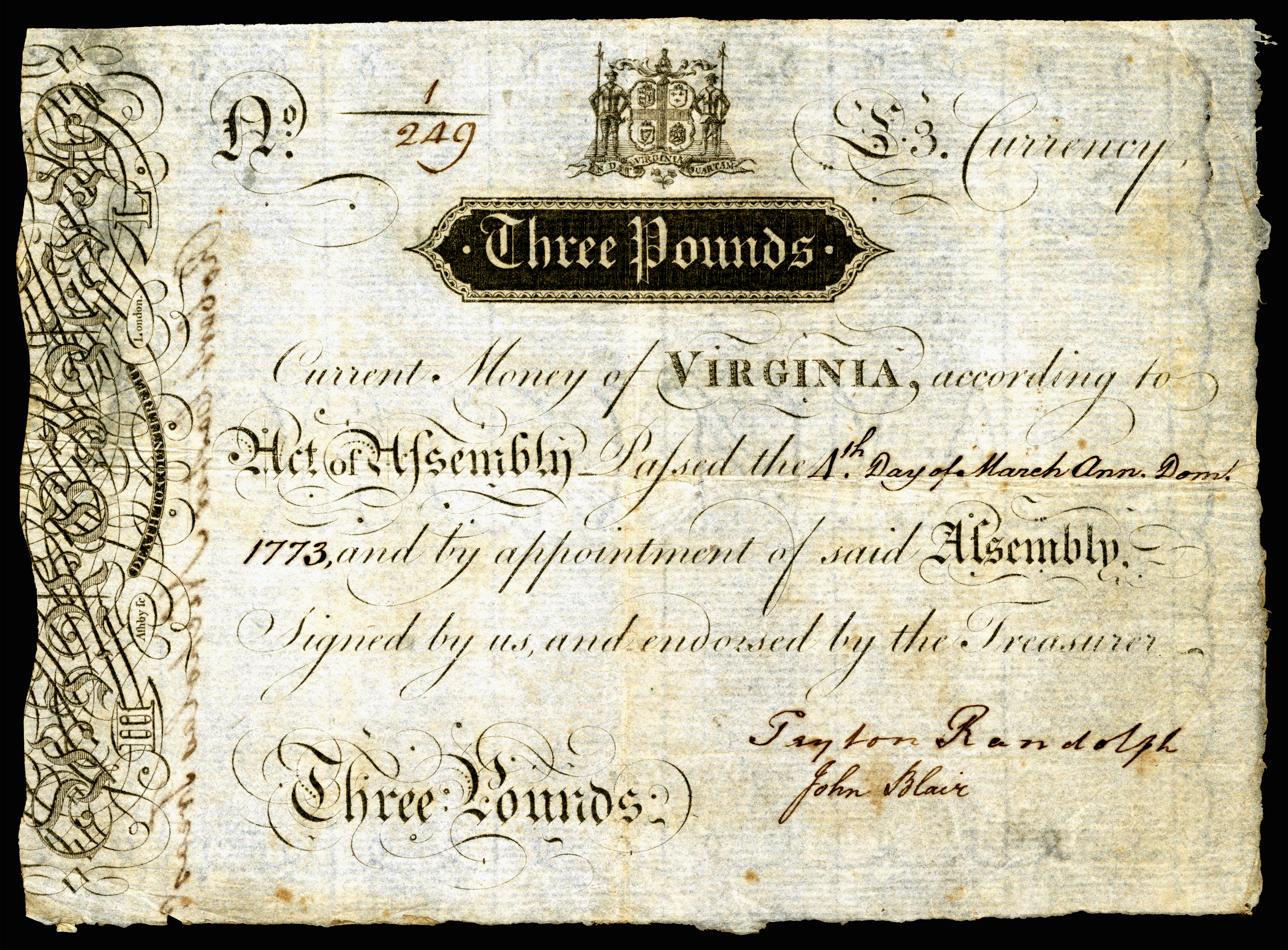
Virginia colonial currency (1773) signed by Randolph and John Blair Jr.

Peyton Randolph (September 10, 1721 – October 22, 1775) was an American politician and planter who was a Founding Father of the United States. Born into Virginia's wealthiest and most powerful family, Randolph served as speaker of Virginia's House of Burgesses, president of the first two Virginia Conventions, and president of the First Continental Congress. He also served briefly as the first president of the Second Continental Congress.

In 1774, Randolph signed the Continental Association, a trade boycott adopted by the First Continental Congress in response to the British Parliament's Intolerable Acts. Randolph was a first cousin once removed of Thomas Jefferson and was also related to John Marshall, the fourth Chief Justice of the United States, and Robert E. Lee, commander of the Confederate States Army in the American Civil War.

== Early life and education ==
Coat of Arms of William Randolph

Randolph was born on September 10, 1721, in Tazewell Hall, his family's estate in Williamsburg, Virginia. His father was Sir John Randolph, and his brother was John Randolph. Peyton Randolph was 15 when his father died. He attended the College of William & Mary and later studied law at Middle Temple at the Inns of Court in London, becoming a member of the bar in 1743.

A lifelong resident of Williamsburg, the colony's capital, Randolph was to follow in the footsteps of his father, grandfather, and great-grandfather, all of whom served as speaker of the Virginia House of Burgesses.

== Career ==
In 1748, Randolph was appointed attorney general of the Colony of Virginia and the same year was elected to the Virginia House of Burgesses, where he would serve for the remainder of his life. It was Randolph's dual roles as attorney general and as burgess that would lead to an extraordinary conflict of interest in 1751. Governor Robert Dinwiddie had imposed a fee for the certification of land patents, which the House of Burgesses strongly objected to. The House selected Randolph to represent their cause to Crown authorities in London.

In his role as attorney general, though, he was responsible for defending actions taken by the governor. Randolph left for London, over the objections of Governor Dinwiddie, and was replaced for a short time as attorney general by George Wythe. Randolph resumed his post on his return at the behest of Wythe as well as officials in London, who also recommended the governor drop the new fee.

=== American Revolution ===
In 1765, Randolph found himself at odds with a freshman burgess, Patrick Henry, over the colony's response to the Stamp Act. The House appointed Randolph to draft objections to the act, but his more conservative plan was trumped when five of Henry's seven Virginia Stamp Act Resolutions passed. Henry's proposals were approved at a meeting of the House in which most of the members were absent and while Randolph was presiding in the absence of the speaker.

Randolph resigned as king's attorney (attorney general) in 1766, as fellow Burgesses elected him as their speaker upon the death of his relative, the powerful Speaker John Robinson. Sitting as the General Court, they also appointed Randolph one of the executors (along with Wythe and Edmund Pendleton) of the former speaker's estate, which was a major financial scandal. As friction between Britain and the colonies progressed, Randolph grew to favor independence. In 1769 the House of Burgesses was dissolved by Governor Norborne Berkeley, 4th Baron Botetourt, in response to its actions against the Townshend Acts. In 1773, Randolph chaired the Virginia committee of correspondence. The next governor, John Murray, 4th Earl of Dunmore, also dissolved the House of Burgesses in 1774 when it showed solidarity with Boston, Massachusetts, following the Boston Port Act.

Randolph chaired meetings of the first of five Virginia Conventions of former House members, principally at a Williamsburg tavern, which worked toward responses to the unwelcome tax measures imposed by the British government. On March 21, 1775, he was president of the Second Virginia Convention in Richmond that debated independence (the setting of Patrick Henry's famous "Give me liberty or give me death!" speech). In April, Randolph negotiated with Lord Dunmore for the removal of gunpowder from the Williamsburg arsenal during the Gunpowder Incident, which was a confrontation between the governor's forces and Virginia militia, led by Henry.

The House of Burgesses was called back by Lord Dunmore one last time in June 1775 to address British Prime Minister Lord North's Conciliatory Resolution. Randolph, who was a delegate to the Continental Congress, returned to Williamsburg to take his place as Speaker. Randolph indicated that the resolution had not been sent to the Congress (it had instead been sent to each colony individually in an attempt to divide them and bypass the Continental Congress). The House of Burgesses rejected the proposal, which was also later rejected by the Continental Congress.

Randolph was the last speaker of the House of Burgesses (their role was replaced by the Virginia Conventions and later the House of Delegates in 1776). Randolph also served as the president of the Third Virginia Convention in July 1775, which as a legislative body elected a committee of safety to act as the colony's executive since Lord Dunmore had abandoned the capital and took refuge on a British warship. Pendleton succeeded Randolph as president of the later conventions.

==== First and Second Continental Congress ====
Virginia selected Randolph as one of its delegates to the Continental Congress in Philadelphia in 1774 and 1775. Fellow delegates elected him their president (speaker) of both the First Continental Congress, which requested that King George III repeal the Intolerable Acts and passed the Continental Association, and president of the Second Continental Congress, which extended the Olive Branch Petition as a final attempt at reconciliation. However, Randolph fell ill during each term. Henry Middleton of South Carolina succeeded him as president from his resignation on October 22, 1774, two days after presiding over the passage and signing of the Continental Association, until his return on May 10, 1775. He was again elected president of Congress, but Randolph left for Virginia four days later and was succeeded as president by John Hancock.

== Death ==
Randolph returned as a Virginia delegate but suffered a five-hour-long stroke while dining with Thomas Jefferson in Philadelphia, and died later that evening on October 22, 1775. His remains were returned to Williamsburg, where they were interred at the chapel of the College of William & Mary. Since renamed the Wren Building, Randolph remains buried in the chapel following its restoration.

== Legacy ==
The Continental Congress honored Randolph by naming one of the first naval frigates as the USS Randolph, as well by naming a fort at the junction of the Ohio River and the Kanawha River, as Fort Randolph.

Randolph County, North Carolina; Randolph, Massachusetts; and Randolph County, Indiana, were named to honor the colonial statesman.

During World War II, the early Essex-class aircraft carrier USS Randolph (CV-15) was named for him. The Peyton Randolph House in Colonial Williamsburg was declared a National Historic Landmark in 1970.

Political offices
New creation	President of the First Continental Congress; September 5, 1774 – October 21, 1774	Succeeded by Henry Middleton
Preceded by Henry Middleton (as President of the First Continental Congress)	President of the Second Continental Congress; May 10, 1775 – May 24, 1775	Succeeded by John Hancock
Preceded by John Robinson	Speaker of the Virginia House of Burgesses; 1766 – 1775	Abolished
