= Deputy attorney general =

Second-highest-ranking official in a department of justice or law

The deputy attorney general (DAG) is the second-highest-ranking official in a department of justice or of law, in various governments of the world. In those governments, the deputy attorney general oversees the day-to-day operation of the department, and may act as attorney general during the absence of the attorney general. In Pakistan, Assistant Attorney General (AAG) & Deputy Attorney General (DAG) is of (BPS) grade 20. In the United States, the deputy attorney general is appointed by the president.

In Pakistan, there is additional attorney general then deputy attorney general and backbone of the attorney general's office is assistant attorney general, all are appointed by the president of Pakistan.
