= John Prentis =

American politician

John Prentis (c. 1726 – c. 1775) eldest son of William Prentis and Mary (Brooke) Prentis of Williamsburg, Virginia. His father owned and operated a successful ordinary store which he inherited upon his father's death in 1765. During his life he served the Williamsburg community in several capacities including: Justice of the Peace, Sheriff of York County, judge of the York County Court, vestryman of Bruton Parish Church, colonel in the Williamsburg militia and as mayor of Williamsburg, Virginia from 1759 to 1760.

Preceded by John Randolph (Williamsburg)	Mayor of Williamsburg, Virginia; 1759–1760	Succeeded by Thomas Everard
