= Coolidge (surname) =

Coolidge is a surname.

Notable people and characters with the surname include:

== People ==
- Archibald Cary Coolidge (1866–1928), American history professor and diplomat
- Calvin Coolidge (1872–1933), 30th president of the United States
- Calvin Coolidge Jr. (1908–1924), second and youngest son of President Calvin Coolidge
- Calvin Galusha Coolidge (1815–1878), American politician and farmer
- Cassius Marcellus Coolidge (1844–1934), American painter
- Charles A. Coolidge (1844–1926), American army general
- Charles Allerton Coolidge (1858–1936), American architect
- Charles H. Coolidge (1921–2021), American army soldier
- Clark Coolidge (born 1939), American poet
- Eliska Haskova Coolidge (born 1941 as Eliška Hašková), Czech American assistant at the White House and the U.S. Department of State
- Elizabeth Sprague Coolidge, American pianist and patron of music, especially of chamber music.
- Grace Coolidge (1879–1957), wife of Calvin Coolidge and First Lady of the United States from 1923 to 1929
- Hamilton Coolidge (1895–1918), American pursuit pilot
- Harold Jefferson Coolidge Jr. (1904–1985), American primatologist
- Harold Jefferson Coolidge Sr. (1870–1934), American lawyer and author
- Harriet Abbott Lincoln Coolidge (1849–1902), American author, philanthropist, reformer
- Jennifer Coolidge (born 1961), American actress
- John Coolidge (1906–2000), businessman, first son of President Calvin Coolidge
- John Calvin Coolidge Sr. (1845–1926), American politician and businessman
- John Coolidge Adams (born 1947), American minimalist composer
- John Gardner Coolidge (1863–1936), American diplomat
- Julian Coolidge (1873–1954), American mathematician
- Marcus A. Coolidge (1865–1947), US Senator from Massachusetts
- Martha Coolidge (born 1946), American film director
- Mary Roberts Coolidge (1860–1945), American sociologist
- Mountfort Coolidge (1888–1954), American painter and antique dealer
- Peggy Stuart Coolidge (1913–1981), American composer
- Philip Coolidge (1908–1967), American actor
- Priscilla Coolidge (1940–2014), American singer
- Rita Coolidge (born 1945), American music star
- Sherman Coolidge (1862-1932), Native American clergyman, educator and activist.
- Susan Coolidge (1835–1905), American children's author, pen name of Sarah Chauncey Woolsey
- William D. Coolidge (1873–1975), American physicist
- W. A. B. Coolidge (1850–1926), American historian, theologian, and mountaineer

== Fictional Characters ==
- Butch Coolidge, character in the 1994 film Pulp Fiction
- Senel Coolidge, the main character in the Japanese RPG Tales of Legendia
