= John Gardner Coolidge =

American diplomat (1863–1936)

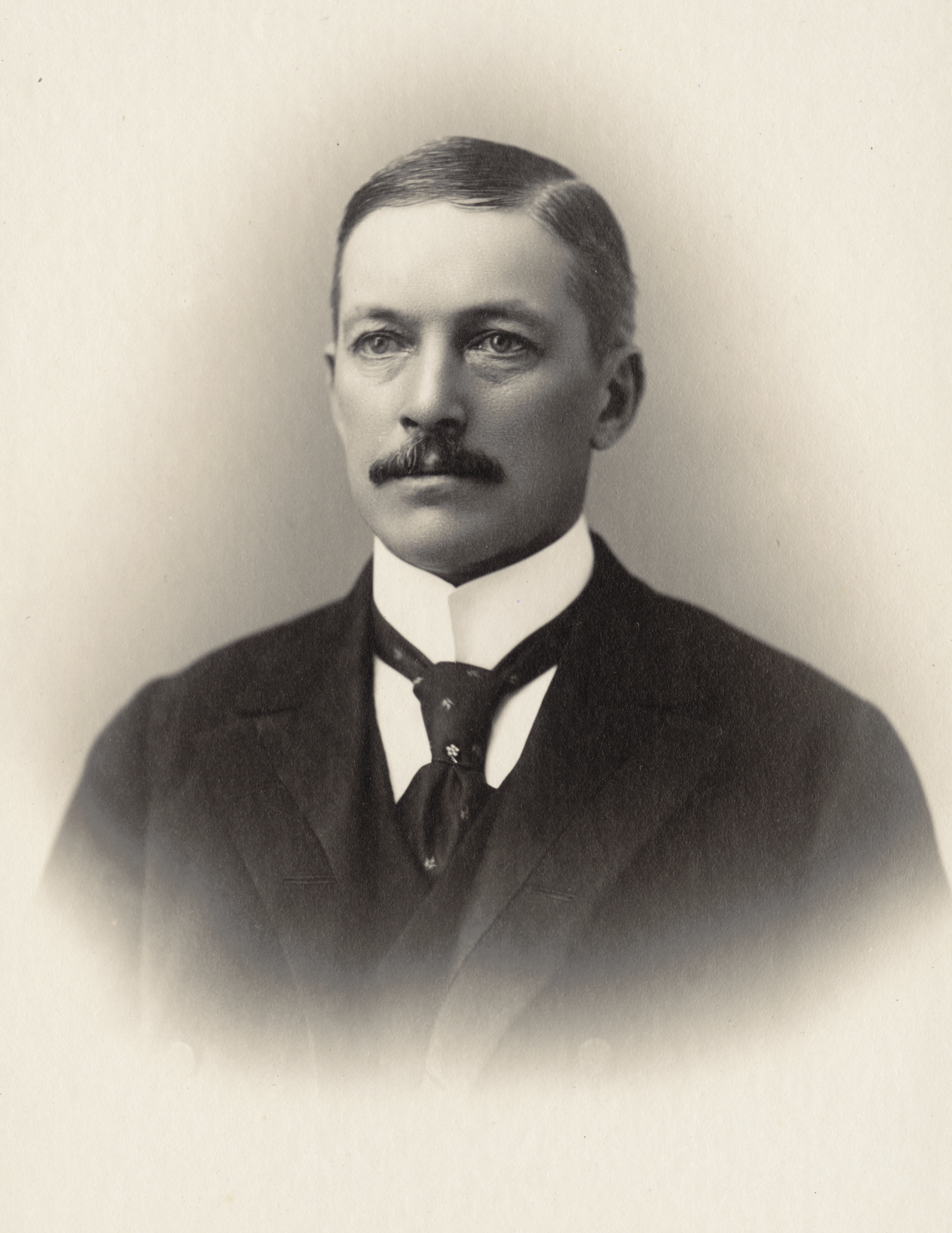

United States Minister to Nicaragua
- In office June 5, 1908 – November 21, 1908
- President: Theodore Roosevelt
- Preceded by: William L. Merry
- Succeeded by: John H. Gregory, Jr.

Personal details
- Born: July 4, 1863 Boston, Massachusetts
- Died: February 28, 1936 (aged 72) Boston, Massachusetts
- Party: Republican
- Spouse: Helen Granger Stevens (m. 1909)
- Relations: Archibald Coolidge (brother); Harold J. Coolidge (brother); J. Randolph Coolidge Jr. (brother); Julian L. Coolidge (brother)
- Parent(s): Joseph Randolph Coolidge; Julia Gardner
- Education: Harvard College (AB)

John Gardner Coolidge (July 4, 1863 – February 28, 1936) was an American collector, diplomat, author, and nephew of Isabella Stewart Gardner. He was the United States Minister to Nicaragua.

== Early life ==
Coolidge was born in Boston, Massachusetts, on July 4, 1863. He was the second of five sons born to Harvard Law School graduate Joseph Randolph Coolidge and Julia (née Gardner) Coolidge, both from prominent and wealthy Boston Brahmin families. His siblings included professor and diplomat Archibald Cary Coolidge, noted lawyer Harold Jefferson Coolidge Sr. (the father of zoologist Harold Jefferson Coolidge Jr.), architect J. Randolph Coolidge Jr. and mathematician and professor Julian Lowell Coolidge.

His paternal uncle was Thomas Jefferson Coolidge, the Boston businessman and U.S. Minister to France. His father, Joseph Randolph Coolidge, was a great-grandson of the 3rd United States President Thomas Jefferson, through his maternal great-grandparents, Thomas Mann Randolph Jr. and Martha Jefferson Randolph. John's great-uncles were Thomas Jefferson Randolph, George Wythe Randolph, and his grandfather, Joseph Coolidge, was a distant relative of President Calvin Coolidge.

Through his mother, John was the nephew of John Lowell Gardner II and his wife Isabella Stewart Gardner. His mother and uncle John were the grandchildren of merchant Joseph Peabody, one of the wealthiest men in the United States at the time of his death in 1844.

In 1884, Coolidge, like all of his brothers, graduated from Harvard University. In 1887, he traveled to east for a total of three years, living in Japan and traveling to China, India, Thailand and Malaysia. From 1890 to 1894, he lived in Brazil where he was a first hand witness to a period of vast political developments and a six-month fight between the Brazilian Army and Navy in the Bay of Rio.

== Career ==
From 1902 to 1906, Coolidge was a member of the Peking legation. Coolidge was appointed Minister to Nicaragua in 1908, at a time the relationship between the United States and Nicaragua was poor, and he arrived in Managua in August. He resigned in anger when no apology was forthcoming after a demonstration, ostensibly celebrating Taft's victory in the election, was disbanded and a U.S. flag confiscated in the process, despite an effort on the part of the State Department to calm him down.

== Personal life ==
On April 29, 1909, Coolidge was married to Helen Granger Stevens (1876–1962), a family friend and the daughter of Henry James Stevens and Helen Meade Granger. Their summer home, Ashdale Farm, in North Andover, Massachusetts, now known as The Stevens-Coolidge Place, is a nonprofit museum today. The couple hired architect Joseph Everett Chandler to remodel the estate's homes.

Coolidge died on February 28, 1936, in Boston, Massachusetts and was buried at Mount Auburn Cemetery in Cambridge, Massachusetts.

== Publications ==
- Coolidge, John Gardner (1924). Random Letters From Many Countries. Boston: Marshall Jones. OCLC 565826.
- Coolidge, John Gardner (1931). A war diary in Paris, 1914-1917. Cambridge: Priv. Print. at the Riverside Press. OCLC 279442.

Diplomatic posts
Preceded by William L. Merry	United States Minister to Nicaragua; August 24, 1908–November 21, 1908	Succeeded by John H. Gregory, Jr.
