= Archibald Cary Coolidge =

American librarian (1866–1928)

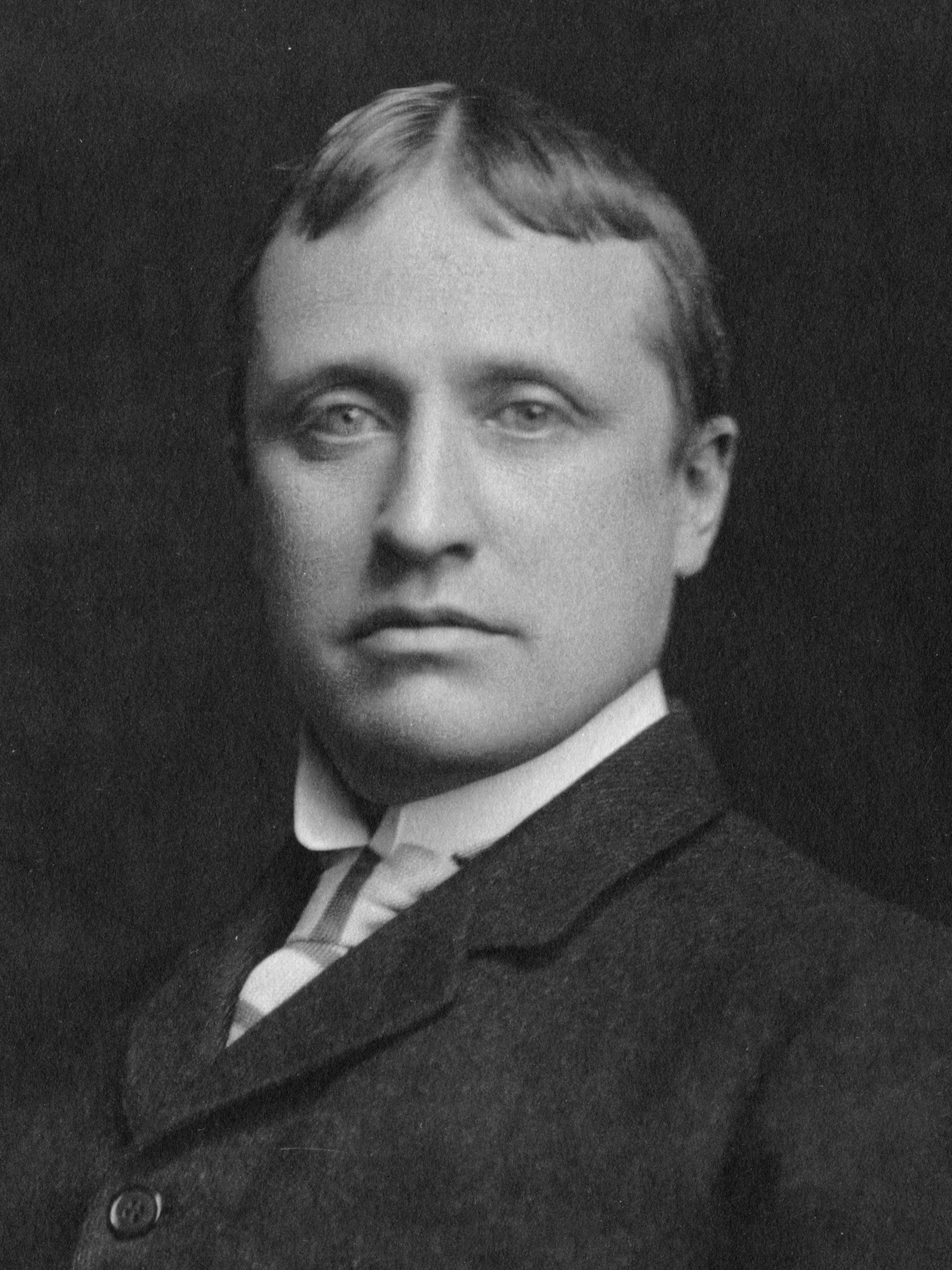
- Coolidge c. 1890
- Born: March 6, 1866; Boston, Massachusetts, U.S.
- Died: January 14, 1928 (aged 61); Boston, Massachusetts, U.S.
- Education: Harvard University; University of Berlin; École des Sciences Politiques; University of Freiburg
- Occupation: Librarian
- Relatives: John G. Coolidge (brother); Harold J. Coolidge (brother); J. Randolph Coolidge Jr. (brother); Julian L. Coolidge (brother)

Archibald Cary Coolidge (March 6, 1866 – January 14, 1928) was an American educator and diplomat. He was a professor of history at Harvard College from 1908 and the first director of the Harvard University Library from 1910 until his death. Coolidge was also a scholar in international affairs, a planner of the Widener Library, a member of the United States Foreign Service, and editor-in-chief of the policy journal Foreign Affairs.

== Early life ==
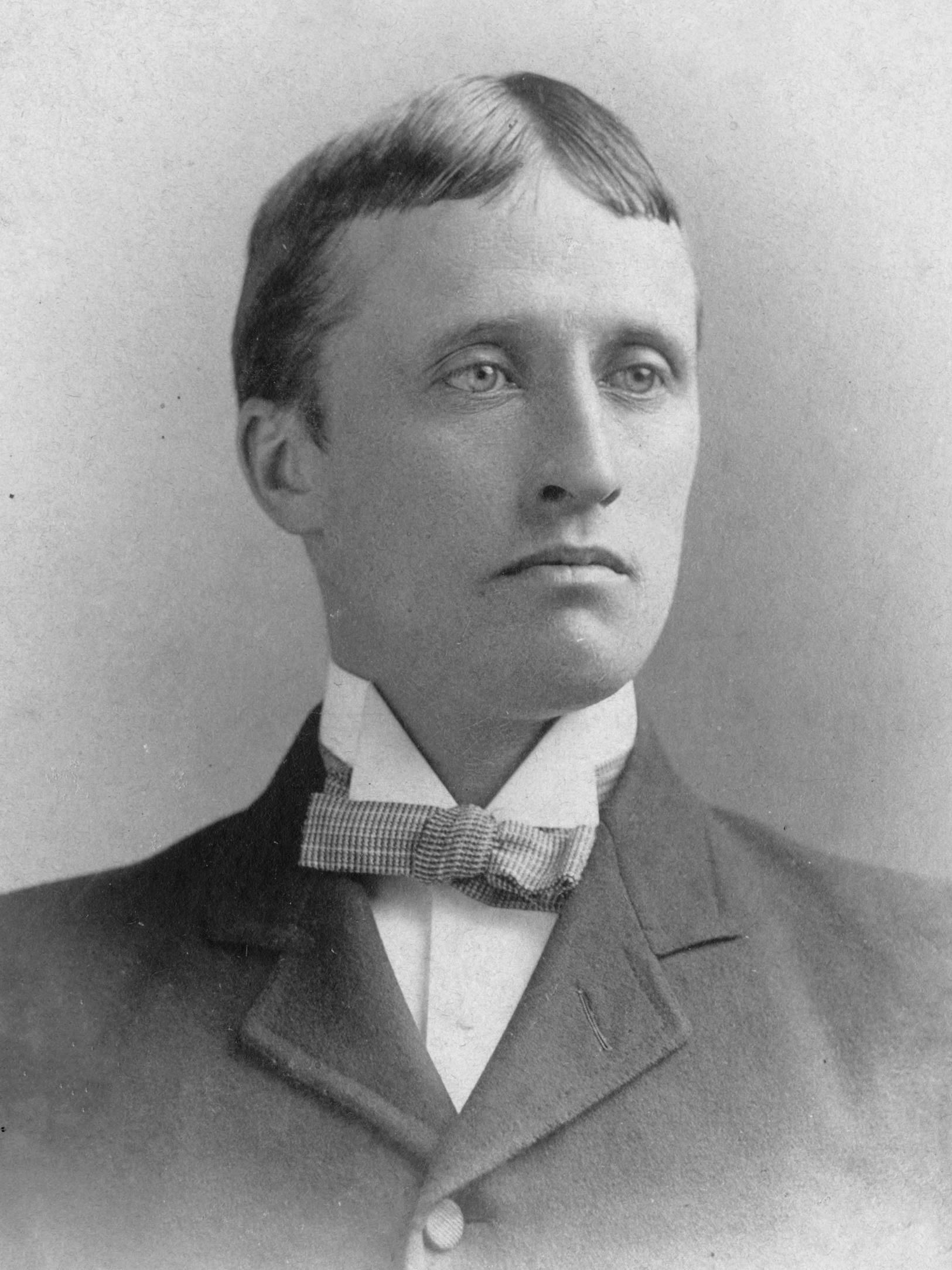
Coolidge in the 1880s

Archibald Coolidge was born in Boston, Massachusetts, as the third of five boys. His parents were Harvard University Law School graduate Joseph Randolph Coolidge and Julia (née Gardner) Coolidge, both from prominent and wealthy Boston Brahmin families. His siblings included U.S. Minister to Nicaragua John Gardner Coolidge, noted lawyer Harold Jefferson Coolidge Sr. (the father of zoologist Harold Jefferson Coolidge Jr.), architect J. Randolph Coolidge Jr. and mathematician and fellow Harvard professor Julian Lowell Coolidge.

His paternal uncle was Thomas Jefferson Coolidge, the Boston businessman and U.S. Minister to France. His father, Joseph Randolph Coolidge, was a great-grandson of the 3rd United States President Thomas Jefferson, through his maternal great-grandparents, Thomas Mann Randolph Jr. and Martha Jefferson Randolph. Archibald's great-uncles were Thomas Jefferson Randolph, George Wythe Randolph, and his grandfather, Joseph Coolidge, was a distant relative of President Calvin Coolidge.

Through his mother, Archibald was the nephew of John Lowell Gardner II. His mother and uncle John were the grandchildren of merchant Joseph Peabody, one of the wealthiest men in the United States at the time of his death in 1844.

Coolidge attended seven different elementary and preparatory schools, the Adams Academy in Quincy, and Harvard College, where he became associated with the Owl Club and graduated summa cum laude in history in 1887. He also attended the University of Berlin and the École des Sciences Politiques in Paris. He earned a Ph.D. from the University of Freiburg in Germany 1892.

== Career ==
From 1893 on, he taught various history courses at Harvard, first as an instructor, from 1899 on as assistant professor, and in 1908, he was made a full professor of history. Coolidge today is recognized as having turned the Harvard College Library into a major research institution. Coolidge helped make the Harvard Library "one of the best organized libraries for scholars and students as well as one of the great libraries of the world." He is further credited with bringing the study of history of Latin America, the Far East, and the Slavic countries to the history department of Harvard. In 1908, he was appointed to the Harvard Library Council and was chairman of this council in 1909. In 1910, he became the first director of the Harvard University Library. Coolidge's tenure saw the building of the Widener Library.

An obituary in the Proceedings of the American Academy of Arts and Sciences noted the following regarding his efforts to make the Library into a centerpiece for Harvard Students:

The first to hold this office, Professor Coolidge gave a creative interpretation to its functions and made it an essential part of University organization. He kept before the University and its friends a broad and comprehensive idea of the Library and its possibilities, and had the satisfaction of seeing the Harvard Library under his administration reach an assured position among the great libraries of the world. This result was due in large to his own wisdom, vision, patient skill, and interest in every side of the Library's welfare. He encouraged equally the acquisition of unique special collections, the prompt and steady purchase of books asked for, and improved facilities for work by members of the University and by visiting scholars.

His own department described his personal characteristics as follows:

He gave himself to history; and it was characteristic of him that his gifts to the Department in his lifetime should take permanent form in his bequests... One prejudice he did not rise above- a prejudice for intellectual distinction; but to him this was a thing of many kinds... His attachments were of the heart. He was a man of strong feeling, quick to anger at injustice, profoundly stirred by sympathy. He hated the waste of useless friction and mis-directed strength... His mind was essentially political: he knew that he lived in a world of men, not of ideas.

Coolidge's time at Harvard shows his true dedication to Academia, with his emphasized focus on history and the improvement of the Harvard Library. He was an essential member of the Harvard Faculty and made improvements to the college that would prove to be long-lasting.

=== Diplomatic career ===
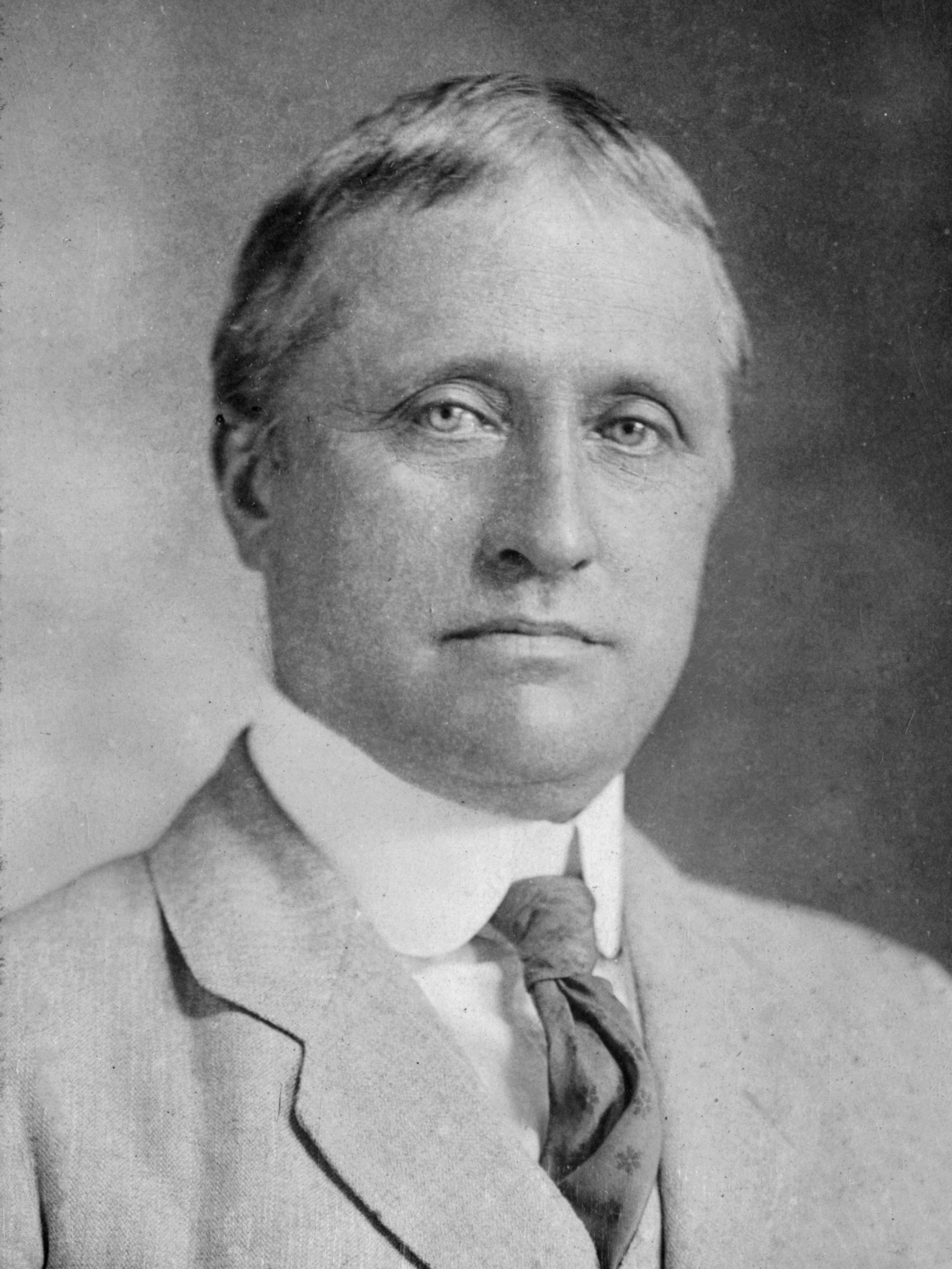
Coolidge in 1900-1903

Between college terms and parallel to his post at Harvard, Coolidge also pursued a career in diplomacy, which fit his travel interests and his desire and aptitude for learning languages well. He held posts as secretary to the American legation in Saint Petersburg, Russia (1890–1891), as private secretary to the American minister in France (1892), and as secretary to the American legation in Vienna (1893).

At the end of World War I, more important assignments followed. Coolidge joined the Inquiry study group established by Woodrow Wilson. The U.S. State Department sent him in 1918 to Russia to report on the situation there. In 1919, he was made the head of the so-called Coolidge Mission, which was "appointed by the American Delegation on 27 December and set up headquarters in Vienna.". Secretary of State Robert Lansing informed Coolidge in a telegram dated December 26, 1918, that "You are hereby assigned to the American Commission to observe political conditions in Austria-Hungary and neighboring countries.". Coolidge and his group in Vienna analyzed the state of affairs on Central Europe and the Balkans and made recommendations for the benefit of the U.S. participants at the Paris Peace Conference, 1919.

Letter from Coolidge at Foreign Affairs (1924)

In 1921, Coolidge worked as a negotiator for the American Relief Administration and helped organize the humanitarian aid to Russia after the famine of 1921. Coolidge also was one of the founders of the Council on Foreign Relations, which grew out of the Inquiry study group, and served as the first editor of its publication Foreign Affairs from 1922 until his death in 1928.

== Personal life ==
Coolidge was a member of the Monticello Association, which was created in 1913 to care for and preserve President Jefferson's home, Monticello, serving as its president from 1919 to 1925.

Coolidge died at his home in Boston, Massachusetts on January 14, 1928.

== Publications ==
- The United States as a World Power (1908)
- The Origins of the Triple Alliance (1917)
- Ten Years of War and Peace (1927)
- Editor-in-Chief, Foreign Affairs, a journal of the Council on Foreign Relations.
