= Snake in the Grass =

Snake in the Grass may refer to:

- Snake in the Grass (1804 schooner), a schooner launched in 1804
- "Snake in the Grass" (song), a 1969 song by Dave Dee, Dozy, Beaky, Mick & Tich
- Snake in the Grass (play), a 2002 play by Alan Ayckbourn
- Snake in the Grass (novel), a 1954 novel by Anthony Gilbert
- Snake in the Grass (TV series), an American reality competition series

== See also ==
- Grass snake
- Serpent (Bible)
