= Antonio Mancini =

Italian painter

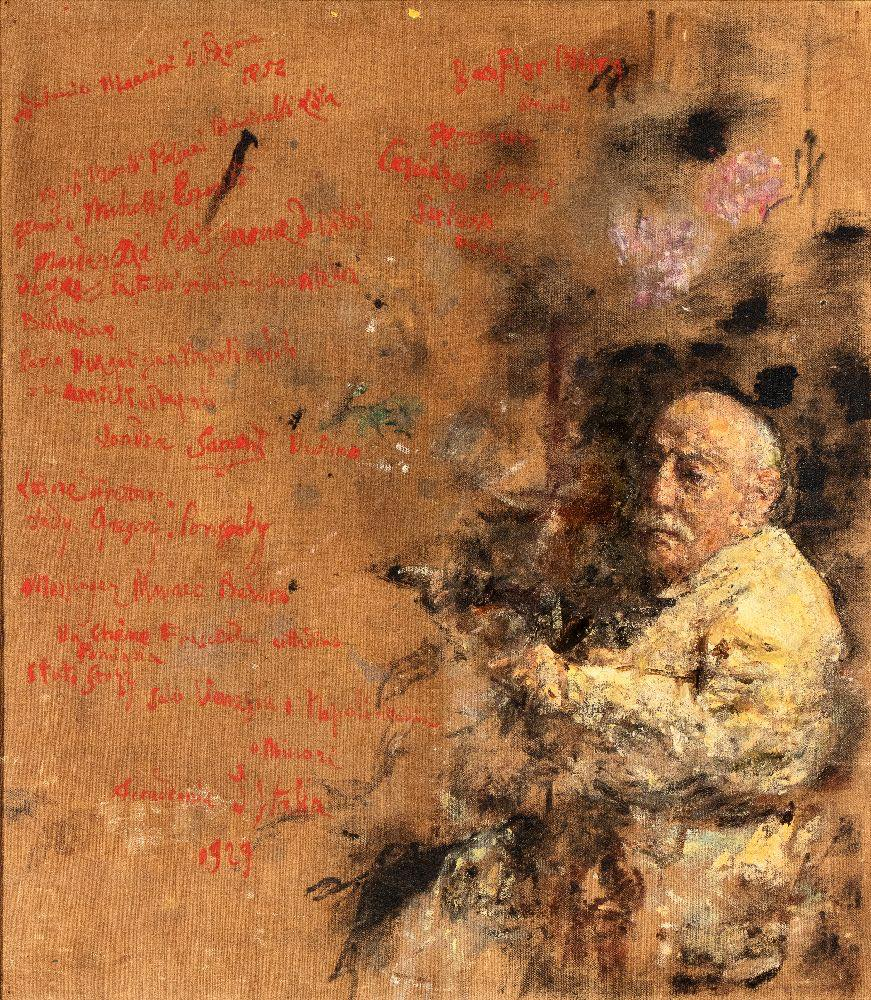
Self-portrait, 1929

Antonio Mancini (14 November 1852 – 28 December 1930) was an Italian painter associated with Verismo, known for his depictions of impoverished children, street performers, portraits and self-portraits. Working principally in Naples and Rome, he developed a highly individual painting technique characterised by vigorous brushwork, thick impasto and the incorporation of materials such as glass and metal foil into the paint surface.

Trained in the Neapolitan naturalist tradition, Mancini first attracted attention during the 1870s with paintings of working-class life. His later career was sustained by an international network of collectors and patrons, and he became an established portraitist among wealthy European and American clients. His unconventional working methods included the use of a double string grid, or graticola, to regulate the proportions and tonal relationships of his compositions. His work was admired by John Singer Sargent, who reportedly described him as the greatest living painter.

== Life and career ==
=== Early life and education ===
Mancini was born on 14 November 1852. Sources differ on his birthplace: the Dizionario Biografico degli Italiani and the Musée d'Orsay record Rome, while the Metropolitan Museum of Art and Isabella Stewart Gardner Museum give Albano Laziale. His family moved to Narni shortly after his birth and subsequently to Naples in 1865.

At the age of twelve, Mancini enrolled at the Institute of Fine Arts in Naples, where his teachers included Raffaele Postiglione and Federico Maldarelli, and later Domenico Morelli. He also studied drawing from life with the sculptor Stanislao Lista. During this period he formed a close friendship with the sculptor Vincenzo Gemito, with whom he shared a studio and an interest in depicting ordinary Neapolitan life.

Mancini's early work was influenced by the naturalism and dramatic effects of light found in seventeenth-century Neapolitan painting. Rather than restricting himself to academic subjects, he drew inspiration from the streets of Naples, particularly children, labourers, musicians and itinerant entertainers. Among his earliest paintings were Testa di bambina (1867), Lo scugnizzo (1868) and Il prevetariello (1870). These works established his interest in psychologically expressive representations of people living in poverty.

In 1871, two of his works, exhibited at the Neapolitan salon, were purchased by two foreign clients, both painters: Per un fiore (For a Flower) by the Canadian-born American painter François B. De Blois and L'ultima medicina (The Last Medicine!) by the French Felix de Lapommeraye.

=== Early success and Paris ===
In 1872, Mancini exhibited two works at the Paris Salon, attracting attention beyond Italy. Through the support of the Belgian composer and patron Albert Cahen, and following contact with the Spanish painter Marià Fortuny, he established a relationship with the Parisian art dealer Adolphe Goupil. Mancini visited Paris in 1875 and again in 1877, encountering an international artistic community that included Giuseppe De Nittis, Giovanni Boldini and Jean-Léon Gérôme.

During these years he produced several of his best-known paintings of children and street performers. A Circus Boy (1872), now at the Metropolitan Museum of Art, portrays a young entertainer holding juggling rings. Le Petit Écolier (c. 1876), now at the Musée d'Orsay, was exhibited at the Paris Salon in 1876.

Another major work, Il Saltimbanco (1879), depicts a young circus performer in an elaborate costume, standing against a relatively spare background. The model was Luigi Gianchetti, known as Luigiello, who appeared in several of Mancini's paintings. The composition has been interpreted in relation to traditional representations of the suffering Christ, particularly the Ecce homo and Man of Sorrows subjects.

Despite his growing reputation, Mancini's Parisian experience was accompanied by financial difficulties and personal conflicts, including the breakdown of his friendship with Gemito. He returned to Naples in 1878 and subsequently experienced periods of serious psychological distress. In October 1881 he was admitted to a psychiatric institution in Naples, remaining under treatment until February 1882. He continued to paint during this period, producing portraits of medical staff and a series of self-portraits.

=== Rome and international patronage ===
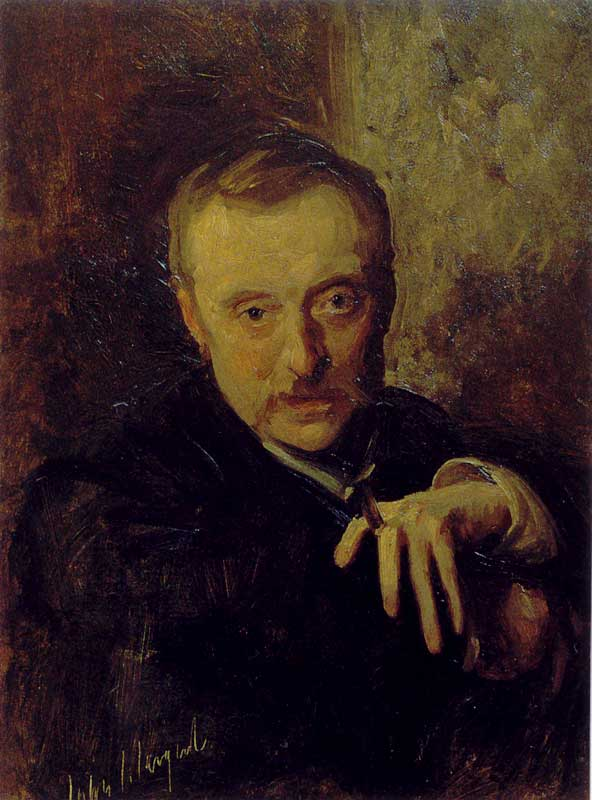
Portrait of Antonio Mancini by John Singer Sargent, c.1898

In 1883 Mancini moved to Rome, where he established relationships with collectors and patrons who provided financial support and commissions. Among them were the Marquis Giorgio Capranica del Grillo, the American collector Daniel Sargent Curtis and members of the Curtis family in Venice.

The Dutch painter and collector Hendrik Willem Mesdag became an important supporter, acquiring and promoting Mancini's paintings in the Netherlands. Their association contributed substantially to Mancini's international reputation and brought his works before Dutch audiences.

During the 1880s and 1890s Mancini continued to develop his portrait painting while experimenting with increasingly unconventional methods of applying and structuring paint. His subjects ranged from family members and working-class models to wealthy patrons. He also painted numerous self-portraits.

In 1895 he met the American collector Isabella Stewart Gardner, who commissioned a portrait of her husband, John Lowell Gardner II. The painting was executed in Venice at the Palazzo Barbaro, where the Gardners were staying with the Curtis family. That year Mancini also participated in the inaugural Venice Biennale, exhibiting two works.

=== International portraits and later career ===
Mancini's international career expanded around the turn of the twentieth century. He visited London in 1901 and again in 1907, where connections involving John Singer Sargent and the Curtis family introduced him to wealthy British patrons. Among his clients was Mary Hunter, whose portrait Mancini exhibited at the Royal Academy of Arts. He also painted members of her family and other prominent figures in British society.

The Irish art collector Hugh Lane became another important patron. Mancini painted Lane's portrait and travelled to Ireland in 1907. His 1889 portrait of the Marquis del Grillo subsequently entered the collection of the National Gallery, London, through Lane's bequest.

In 1903 he painted the portrait of the American ambassador in Italy George Von Lengerke Meyer: believed to be lost, the painting was discovered in 2023 by Italian art historian Manuel Carrera, who found it in the Navy Art Collections, Washington.

After returning to Rome in 1908, Mancini entered an arrangement with the German art dealer Otto Messinger. He produced numerous elaborately staged paintings featuring figures in historical and theatrical costumes. From 1912 until 1918 he worked under the patronage of the French industrialist Fernand du Chêne de Vère, who provided a residence and studio at Frascati, together with costumes, furnishings and other materials for his compositions.

Following the First World War, Mancini returned to Rome and experienced greater financial security and official recognition. A special exhibition of recent works at the 1920 Venice Biennale marked an important moment in his later career. In 1923 he was made an honorary citizen of Naples, and in 1929 he was elected to the newly established Royal Academy of Italy.

Mancini died in Rome on 28 December 1930. In 1935 his remains were transferred to the church of Santi Bonifacio e Alessio on the Aventine Hill.

== Art and technique ==
=== Subjects and artistic development ===
Mancini's early paintings belong to the tradition of nineteenth-century Italian naturalism and are closely associated with Verismo. His depictions of Neapolitan street children, beggars, circus performers and musicians combined close observation with an emphasis on individual expression. Art historian Matteo Lafranconi has characterised these works as psychologically and poetically expressive rather than straightforward exercises in social denunciation.

Although Mancini encountered contemporary French painting during his visits to Paris, his work remained strongly connected to Italian and seventeenth-century Neapolitan traditions. His early paintings frequently employed dark tonalities and pronounced contrasts of light and shadow. Over time, his palette became brighter and his brushwork more animated, with increasingly thick applications of paint and elaborate arrangements of colour and texture.

His later portraits and figure paintings often incorporated richly patterned fabrics, decorative objects and theatrical costumes. While continuing to work from observed subjects, Mancini developed a distinctive approach to pictorial construction in which the physical properties of the painted surface became unusually prominent.

=== Painting methods and the graticola ===
Mancini became particularly known for the heavy application of oil paint, frequently building his surfaces into pronounced ridges and accumulations of pigment. He sometimes embedded pieces of glass, metal foil and other materials in the paint to heighten reflective effects. He was also an accomplished pastellist, employing the medium for portraits and figure studies.

One of his most distinctive working methods involved a device he called the graticola, a perspective grid constructed from a wooden frame strung with threads. Mancini used two corresponding frames, placing one before the subject and the other against the picture surface. The apparatus enabled him to compare the proportions, perspective and tonal relationships of the observed subject with those of the painting.

Unlike conventional methods of transferring a drawing by means of a grid, Mancini frequently allowed the impressions of the strings to remain visible in the finished work. These marks could form a conspicuous network across the paint surface, producing a quilted or segmented appearance. The device thus contributed not only to the construction of his paintings but also to their characteristic texture.

The graticola is visible in a number of his portraits, including the 1895 portrait of John Lowell Gardner II. Mancini's use of the apparatus attracted both admiration and criticism, and contemporary observers sometimes regarded his working procedures as eccentric.

== Reception and legacy ==
Mancini gained recognition during his lifetime through international exhibitions and the support of collectors in Italy, France, the Netherlands, Britain and the United States. Mesdag organised exhibitions of his work in The Hague in 1897 and 1902, while paintings by Mancini received awards at international exhibitions in the early twentieth century.

John Singer Sargent was among his most prominent admirers. A statement attributed to Sargent, praising Mancini as the greatest living painter, was reproduced in the catalogue of a 1928 exhibition at the Knoedler Gallery in London.

Mancini's paintings entered numerous public collections, including the Galleria Nazionale d'Arte Moderna e Contemporanea in Rome, the Metropolitan Museum of Art in New York, the Philadelphia Museum of Art, the Musée d'Orsay in Paris, the National Gallery in London, the Isabella Stewart Gardner Museum in Boston and the Mesdag Collection in The Hague.

In 2007–2008, the Philadelphia Museum of Art organised Antonio Mancini: Nineteenth-Century Italian Master, the first exhibition in the United States devoted exclusively to his work. The exhibition drew upon paintings and pastels donated from the estate of the collector and dealer Vance N. Jordan and was accompanied by a catalogue by Ulrich W. Hiesinger.

A further exhibition, Mancini: Eccentric & Extravagant, was held at the Mesdag Collection in The Hague in 2020, examining his experimental techniques and relationships with international patrons.

== Gallery ==
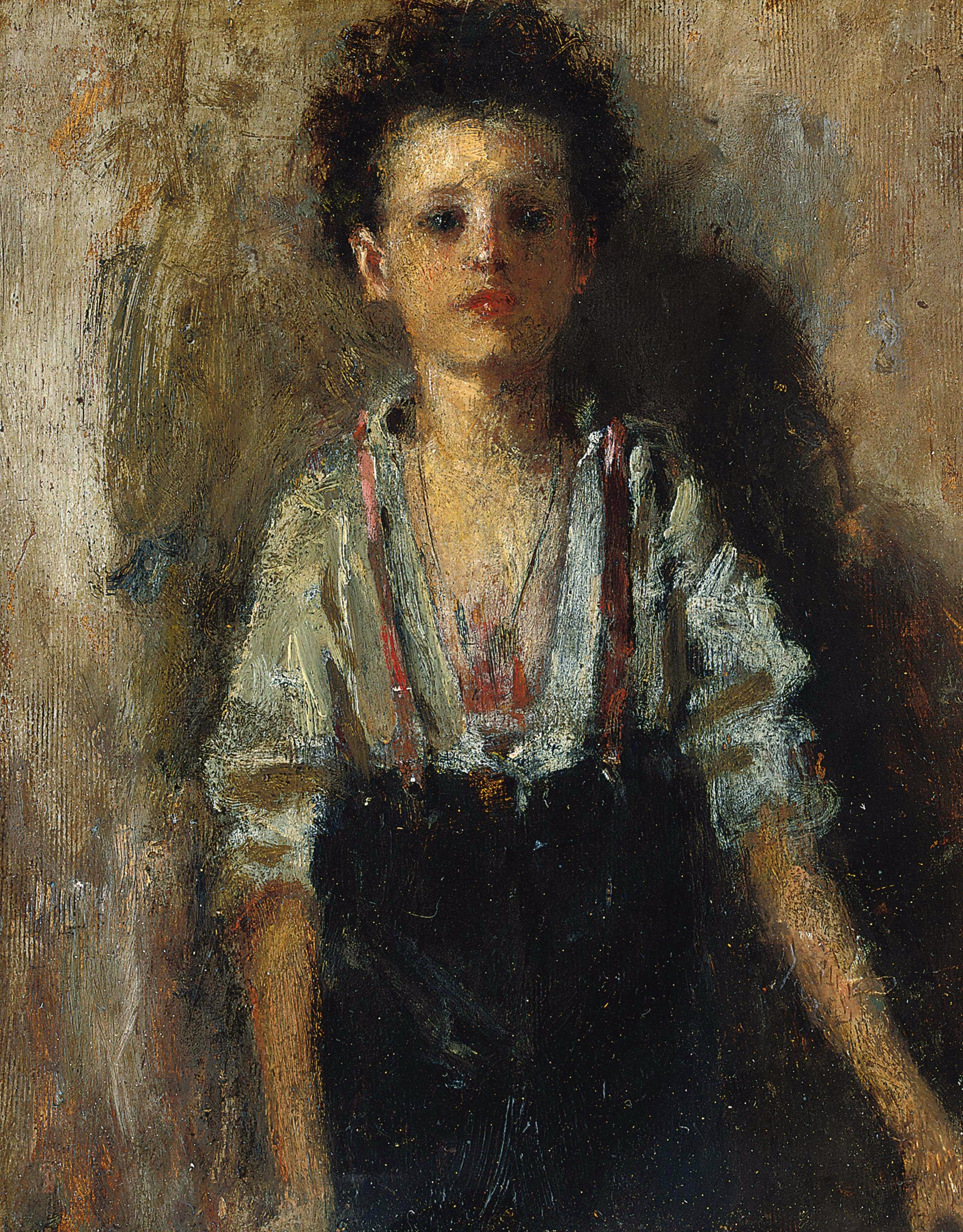
Lo scungizzo
(The Clever Urchin)

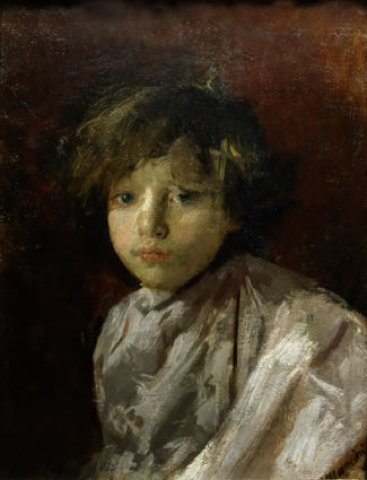
Il Malatino
(The Weakling),
ca. 1878

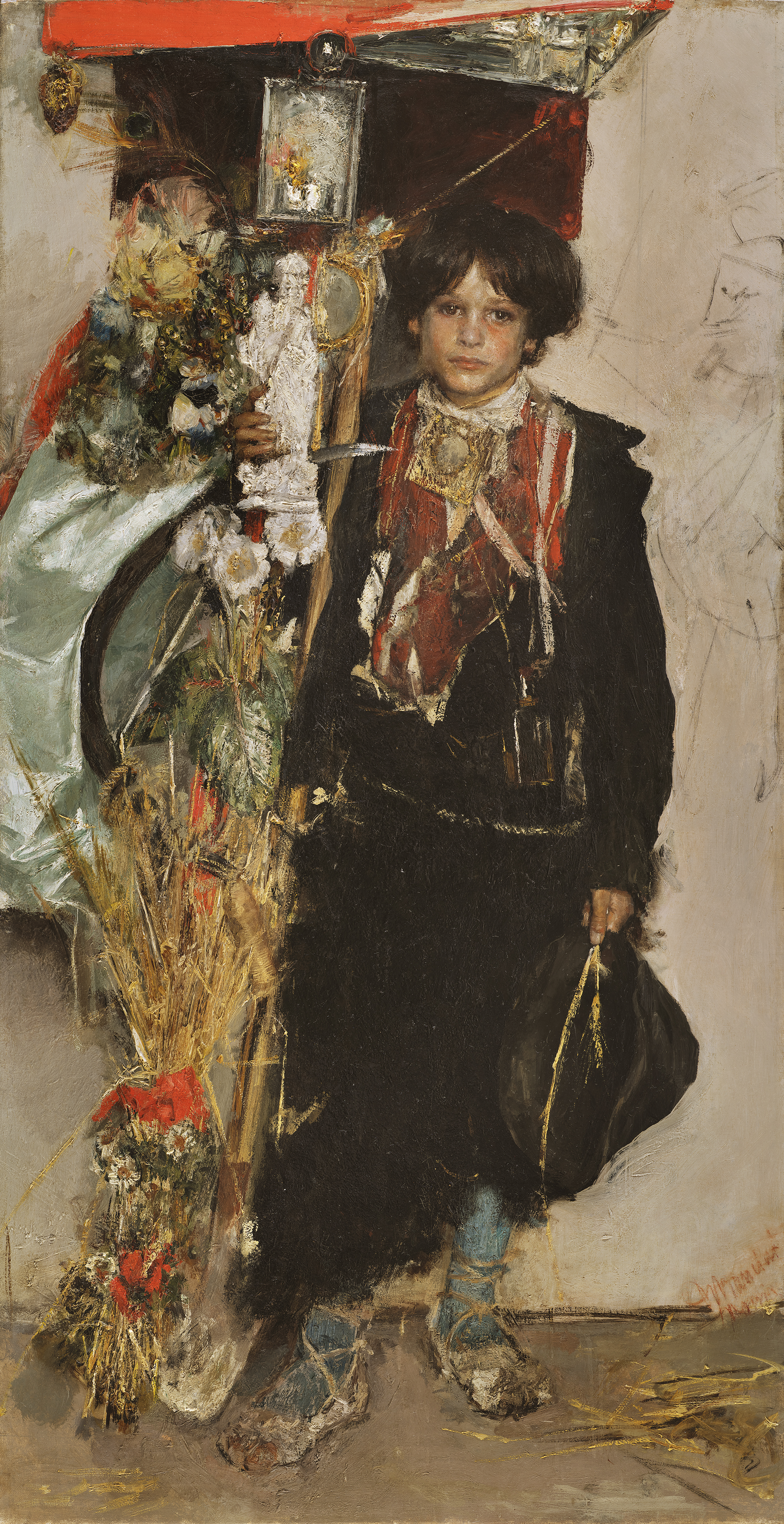
Standard Bearer of the Harvest Festival,
c. 1884

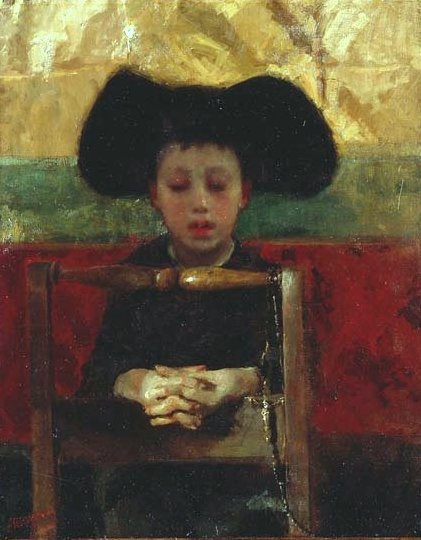
Prevetariello in Preghiera
(The Little Seminarian), 1872

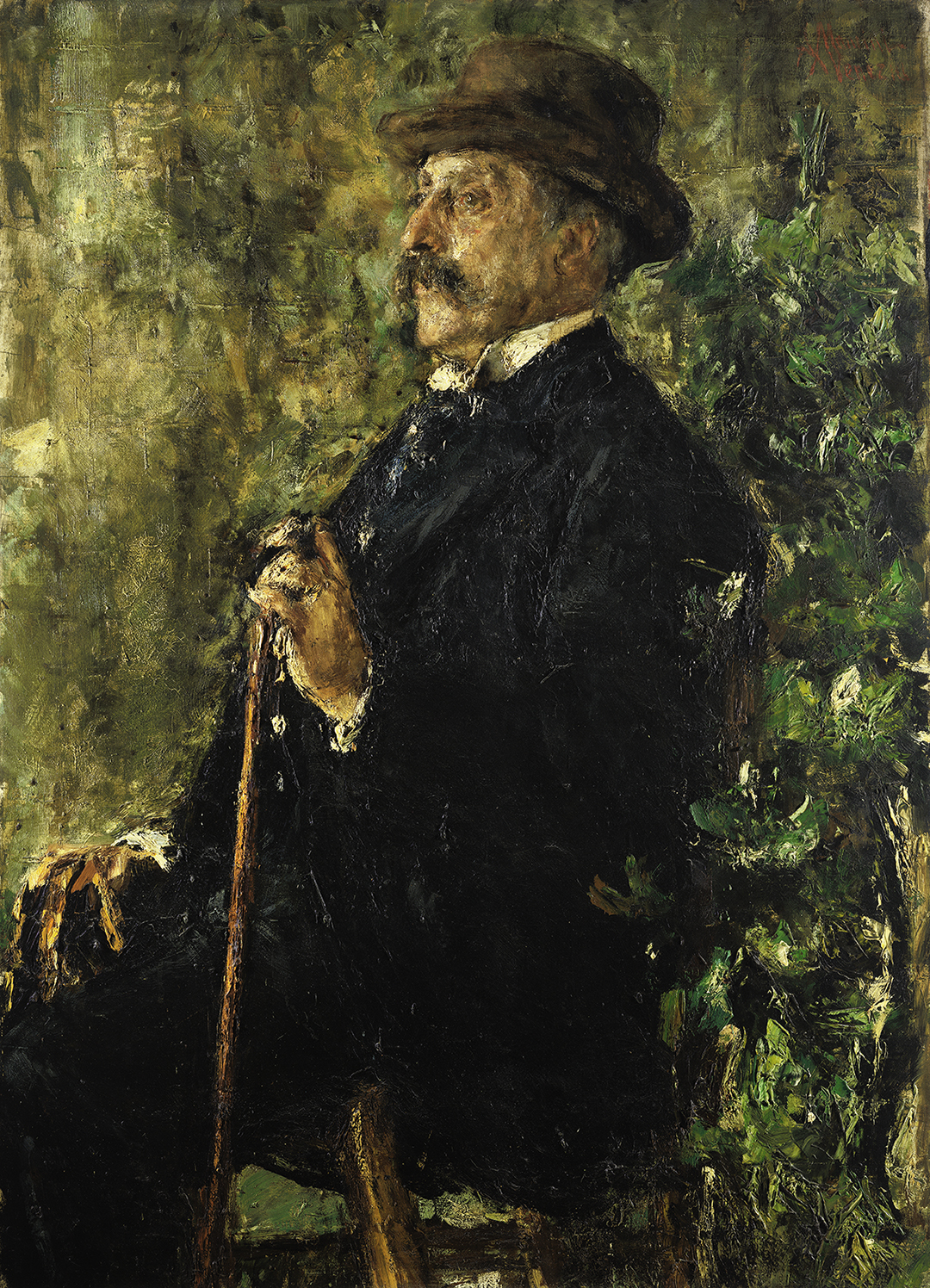
Portrait of John Lowell Gardner II, 1895

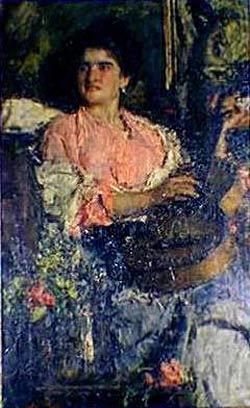
Allegra canzone
(Happy Song)

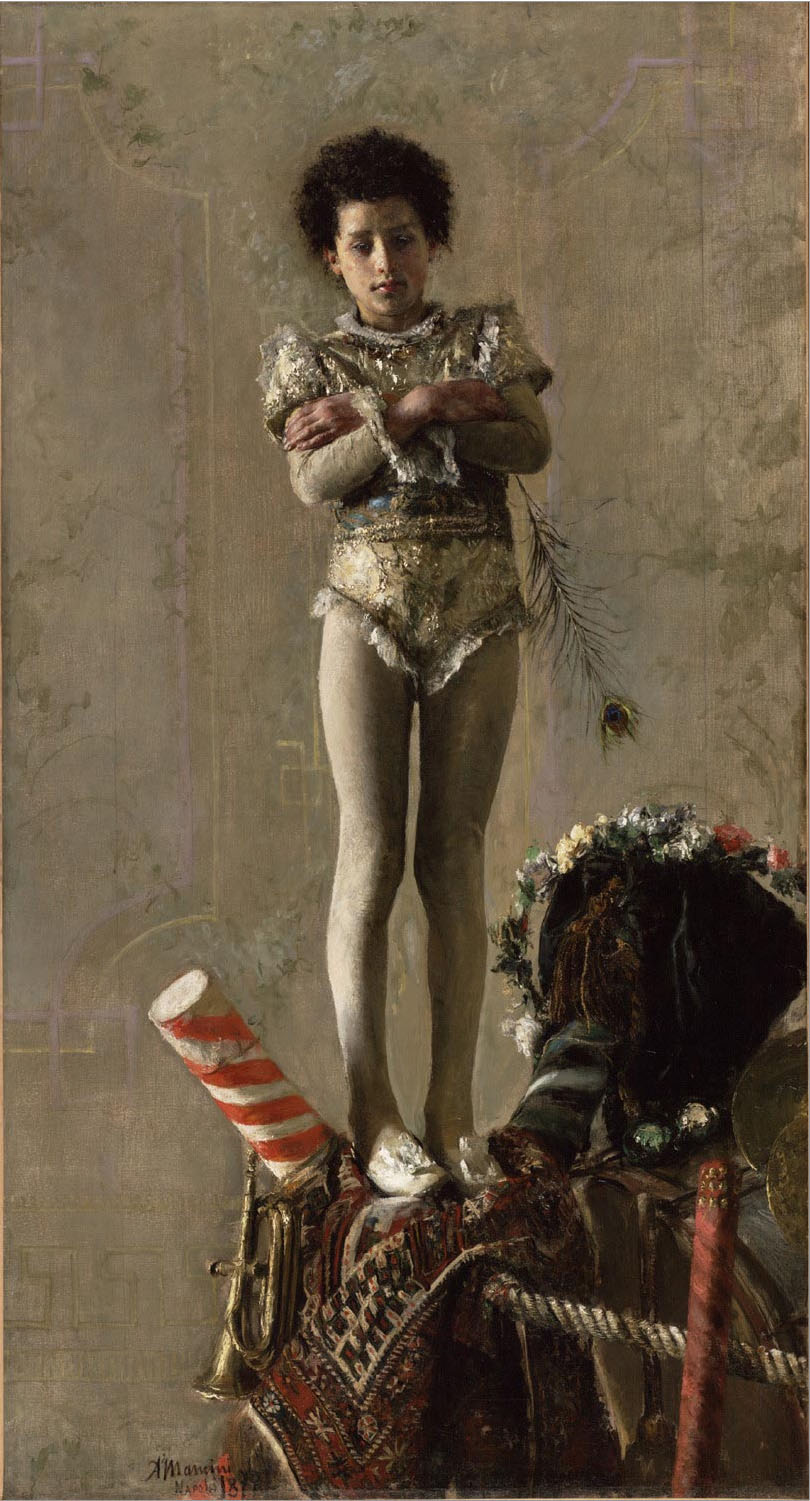
Il Saltimbanco
(the Acrobat), 1879

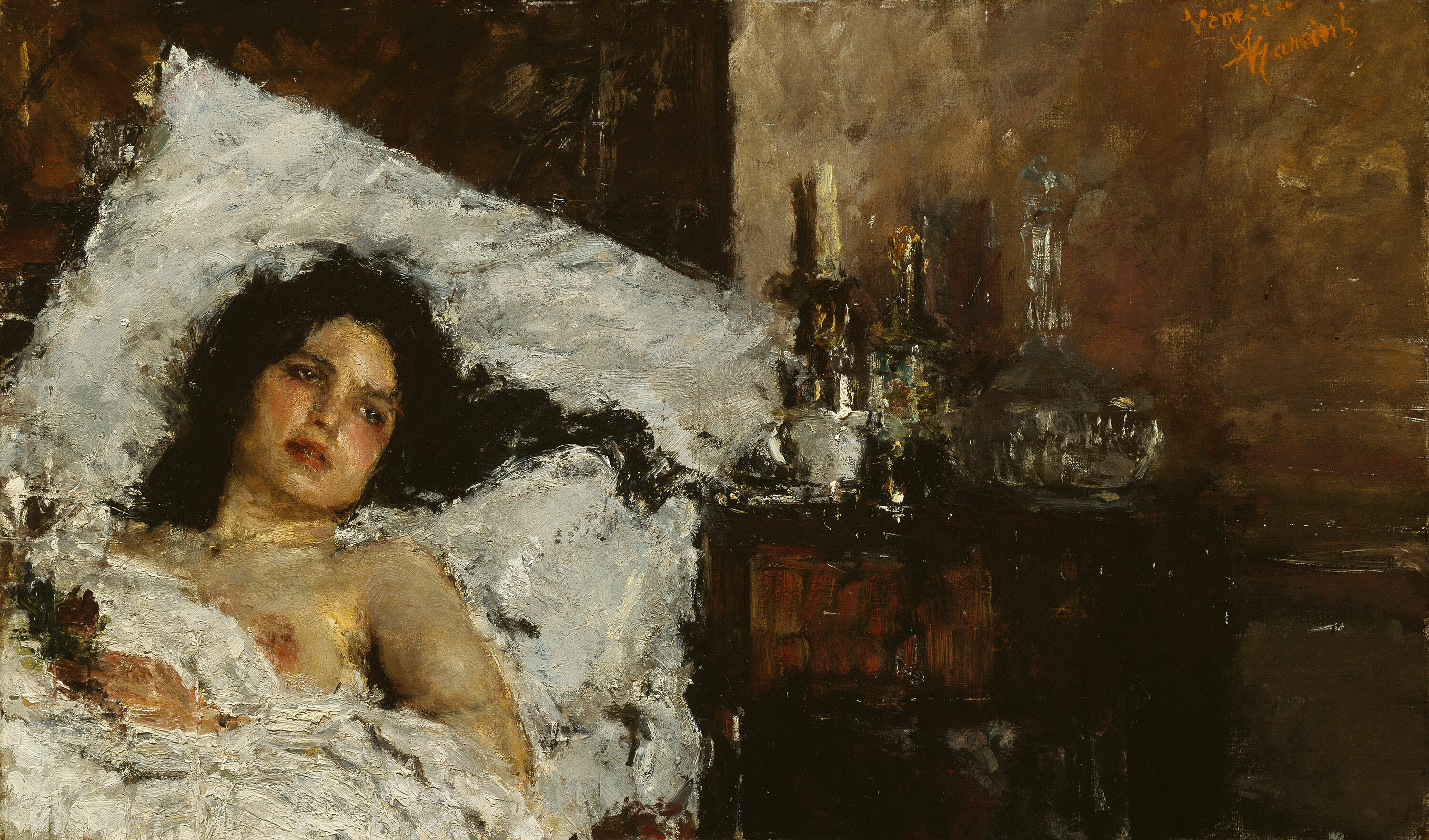
Resting, c. 1887

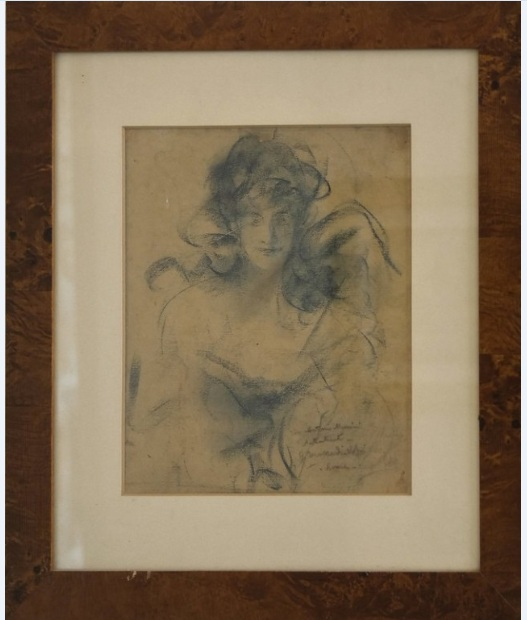
"Ritratto di Signora, 1900 ca" (Casa Museo Francesco Cristina)

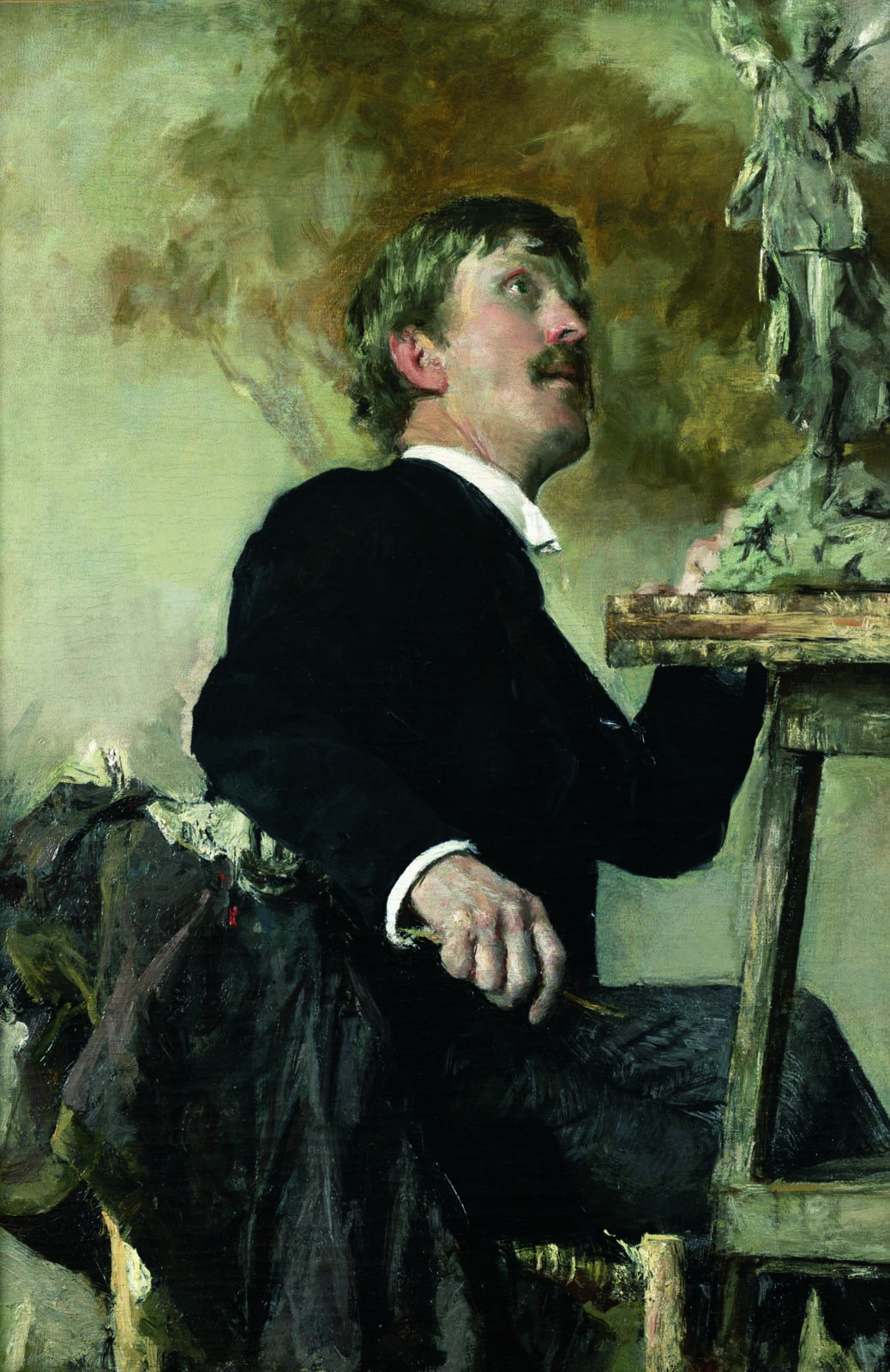
Portrait of the American sculptor John Severinus Conway

== Sources ==
- Ulrich W. Hiesinger (2007). "Antonio Mancini: Nineteenth-Century Italian Master" (Philadelphia Museum of Art), Yale University Press. ISBN 0-300-12220-9
- Broude, Norma (1987). The Macchiaioli: Italian Painters of the Nineteenth Century. New Haven and London: Yale University Press. ISBN 0-300-03547-0
- "Philadelphia Museum of Art". Philadelphia Museum of Art.
- Carrera, Manuel; Mazzocca, Fernando; Sisi, Carlo; Valente, Isabella (2023). Antonio Mancini e Vincenzo Gemito. Cinisello Balsamo: Silvana Editoriale. ISBN 978-88-366-5600-4
- Cinzia Virno, (2019) Antonio Mancini Catalogo Ragionato dell'opera. La pittura a olio - Repertori. Roma, De Luca editori d'arte. ISBN 978-88-6557-396-9
- Cinzia Virno, (2001) La collezione Mancini della Galleria Comunale d’Arte Moderna e Contemporanea di Roma: qualche riflessione sulla tarda attività dell’artista, in Bollettino dei Musei Comunali di Roma, XV, 2001, pp. 155–162.
