= Coolidge =

Coolidge may refer to:

== People ==
- Coolidge (surname), including a list of people and characters with the name
  - Calvin Coolidge (1872–1933), 30th president of the United States

== Places ==
=== United States ===
- Coolidge, Arizona
- Coolidge, Georgia
- Coolidge, Kansas
- Coolidge, Montana, a ghost town.
- Coolidge, Texas
- Coolidge, Wisconsin, a ghost town
- Coolidge Corner, Brookline, Massachusetts
- Calvin Coolidge State Forest, Vermont
- Coolidge Range of the Green Mountains, Vermont

=== Sports venues ===
- Coolidge Cricket Ground a first-class cricket venue in Antigua

== Other ==
- Coolidge effect
- SS President Coolidge
