= J. Randolph Coolidge Jr. =

American architect (1862–1928)

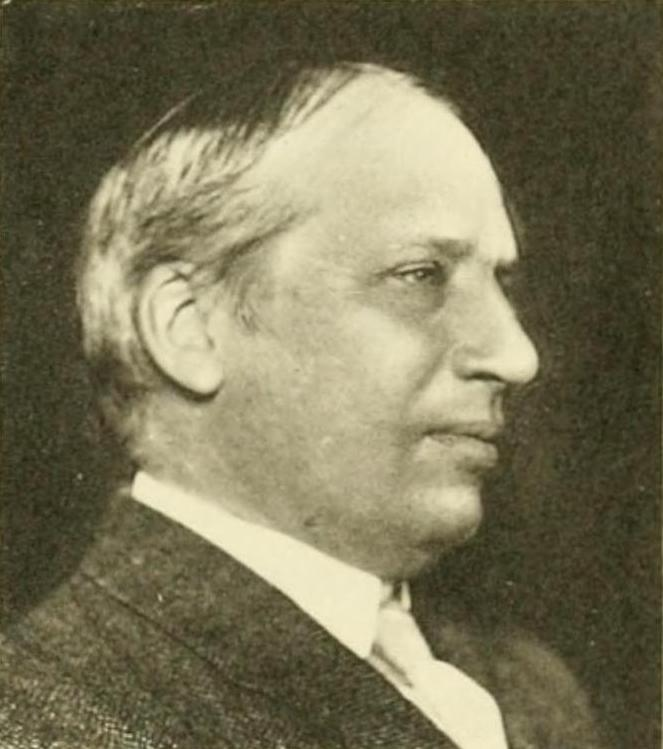
- J. Randolph Coolidge Jr., circa 1913
- Born: May 17, 1862; Boston
- Died: August 8, 1928 (aged 66); Center Sandwich, New Hampshire
- Occupation: Architect

Joseph Randolph Coolidge Jr. FAIA (1862–1928) was an American architect in practice in Boston from 1894 until his retirement in 1923. Beginning in 1901, he was a senior partner of Coolidge & Carlson, an architectural firm noted for large institutional projects.

== Life and professional career ==
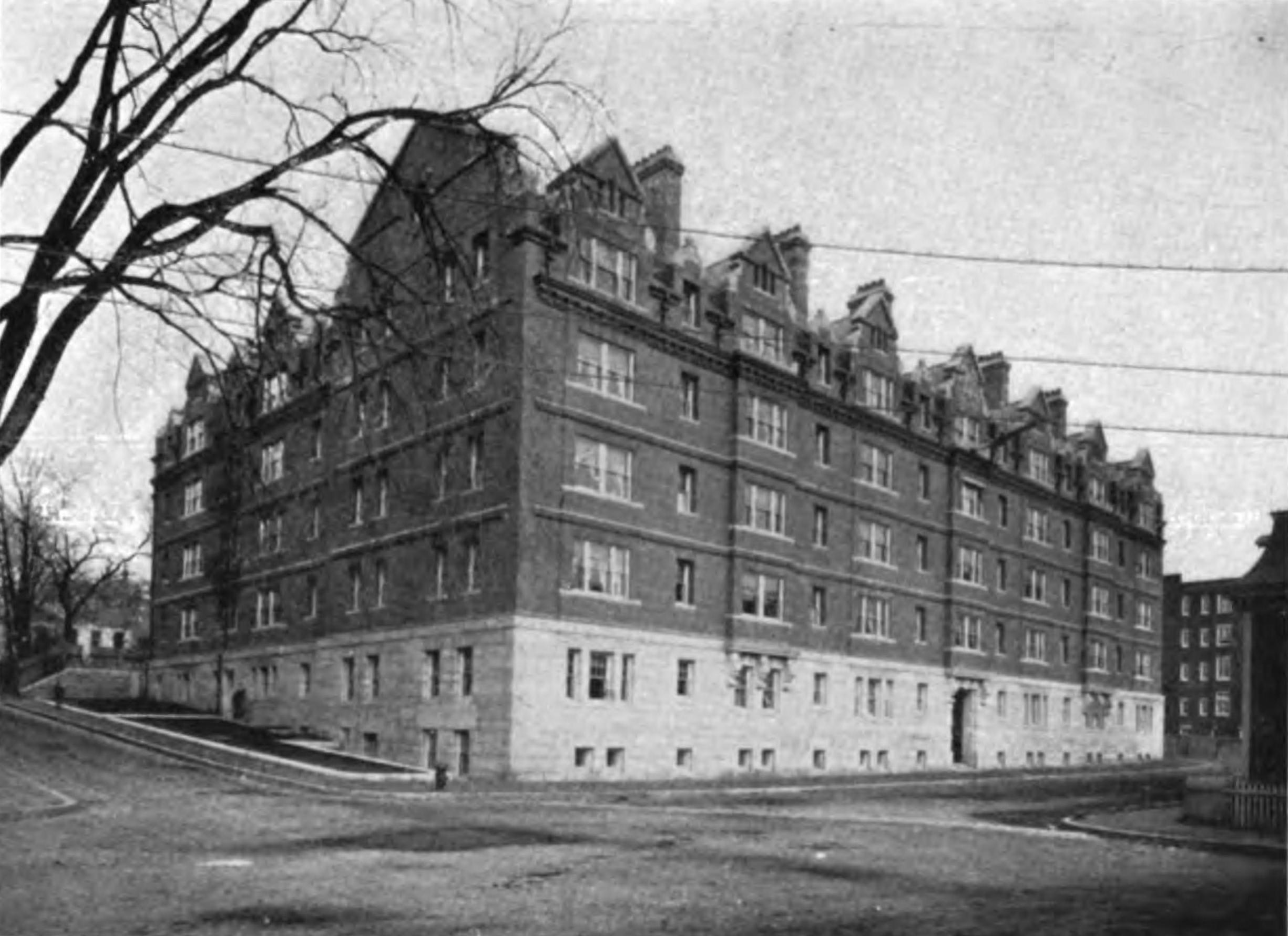
Randolph Hall in Cambridge, designed by Coolidge & Wright and built in 1897.

Joseph Randolph Coolidge Jr. was born May 17, 1862, in Boston to Joseph Randolph Coolidge and Julia (Gardner) Coolidge, both members of wealthy Boston Brahmin families. The eldest of five children to live to adulthood, his brothers were John Gardner Coolidge, Archibald Cary Coolidge, Harold Jefferson Coolidge Sr. and Julian Coolidge. He was educated at the Chauncy Hall School and at Harvard University, graduating with a Bachelor of Arts in 1883 and a Master of Arts in 1884. After graduation, he traveled to Europe for a year. In 1885, intending to enter business, he joined the banking house of Lee, Higginson & Co. in Boston.

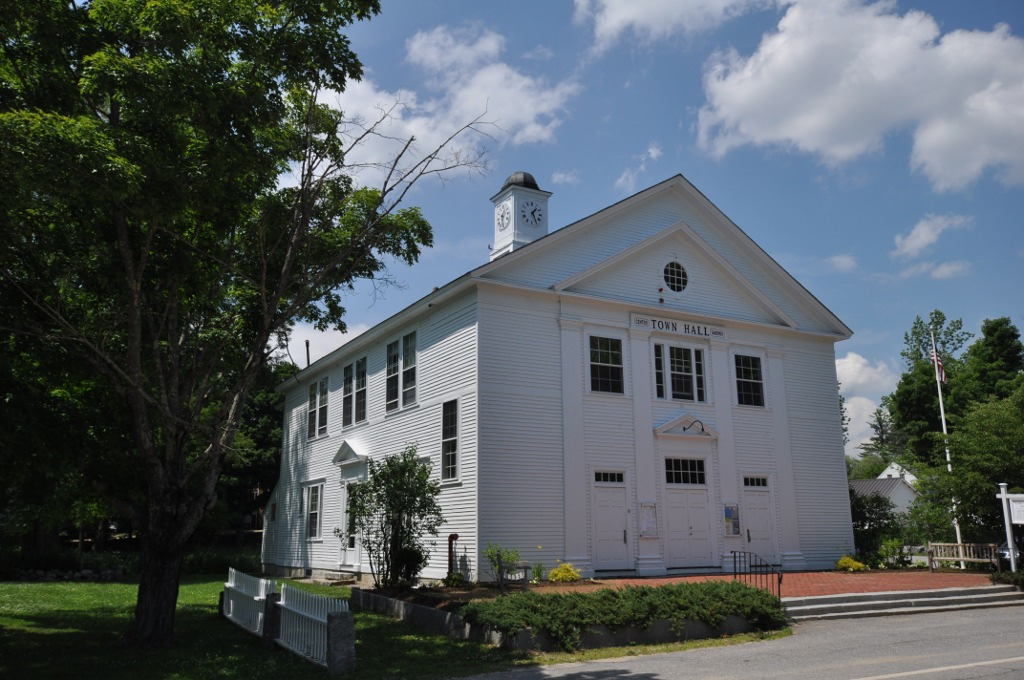
The Town Hall in Sandwich, New Hampshire, designed by Coolidge and completed in 1913.

In 1888, he instead turned to architecture, becoming a drafter in the office of Andrews & Jaques. He worked as a drafter for only a few months before entering the architecture school of the Massachusetts Institute of Technology, graduating in 1890. In 1891, he traveled back to Europe where he was admitted to the Beaux-Arts de Paris and joined the atelier of Henry Duray, a patron popular with American students. Though like many he did not earn a degree, he finished his studies and returned to Boston in 1894.

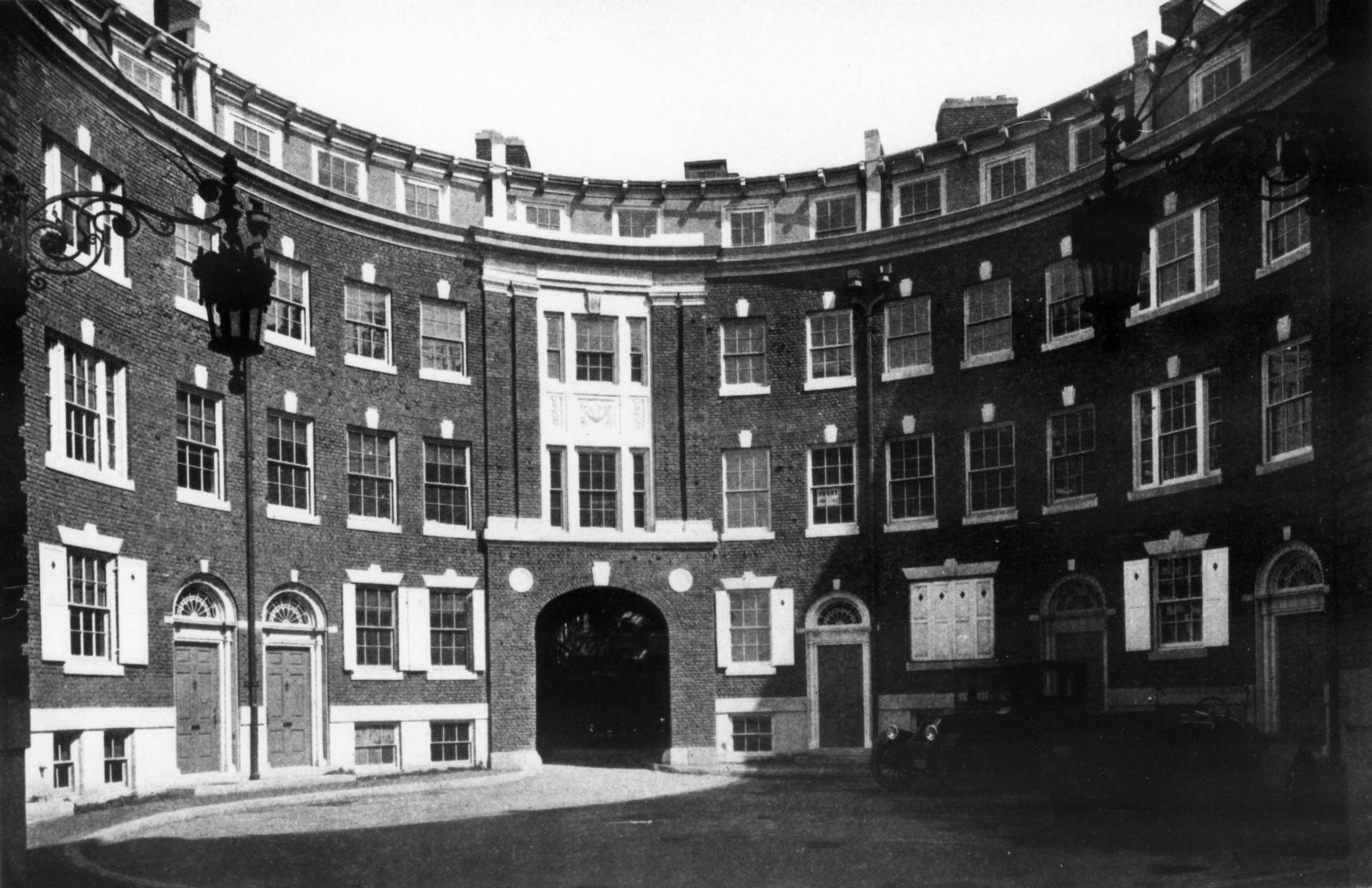
West Hill Place in Boston, designed by Coolidge & Carlson and built in 1916.

In Boston, he formed a partnership with Vernon A. Wright, a former classmate of Coolidge's in both Boston and Paris. Their largest work together was Randolph Hall, a private Harvard dormitory financed by the Coolidge brothers. The firm of Coolidge & Wright lasted only until 1901, when Wright's growing business interests in his native Minnesota obligated him to return there. Coolidge then formed a new partnership with Harry J. Carlson, a former employee of Cass Gilbert and another of Coolidge's classmates. Their partnership under the name of Coolidge & Carlson lasted until 1923, when Coolidge retired. Coolidge was generally hands-off in regard to the work of the firm, more frequently providing criticism to the architects and drafters in his employ. Much of his architectural life was spent in writing, lecturing and teaching.

Coolidge joined the American Institute of Architects in 1900, and was elected a Fellow in 1906. From 1905 until 1907 he was president of the Boston Society of Architects.

== Community service and legacy ==
Like many members of Boston Brahmin families, Coolidge was closely involved in Boston's cultural institutions. He had a particular interest in libraries. In 1899, he was appointed to the board of trustees of the Boston Athenæum, and was a member until 1926. As a member of the Massachusetts Library Club he was vice president for 1911–13 and president for 1914–16. He was a member of the examining committee of the Boston Public Library and an incorporator of the Massachusetts Library Aid Association. In 1917, Woodrow Wilson appointed him regional member of the National Library War Council which had the responsibility of distributing reading materials to soldiers at home and at the front. He was regarded as an expert in library architecture, and his firm designed many of them.

In 1899, Coolidge was appointed to the board of trustees of the Museum of Fine Arts as the representative of the Boston Athenæum. In 1905, he was appointed a member of the building committee for the new building, and in 1906, he was appointed temporary director after the departure of Edward Robinson, but he resigned in 1907 due to other obligations. He was a trustee of the museum until his death.

From 1904 until 1925, Coolidge was director of the Associated Charities of Boston, later the Family Welfare Society. From 1912–13, he was vice president and for 1913–14 president of the Boston Chamber of Commerce.

== Personal life and death ==
Coolidge was married in 1884 to Mary Hamilton Hill, daughter of the English-born merchant and politician Hamilton Andrews Hill. The couple had eight children:

- Joseph Randolph Coolidge III (1887–1936)
- Julia Coolidge (1889–1961)
- Mary Eliza Coolidge (1890-1935)
- Hamilton Coolidge (1895–1918)
- John Gardner Coolidge II (1897–1984)
- Eleonora Randolph (1899–1984)
- Oliver Hill Coolidge (1900–1992)
- Roger Sherman Coolidge (1904–1995)

After his return to Boston, Coolidge and his wife lived on Marlborough Street near his parents' home, moving to Brookline in 1904. In 1916, for developers Matthew Hale and Raymond H. Oveson, Coolidge & Carlson designed West Hill Place, an exclusive rowhouse development in Boston facing the Charles River. As his own home, Coolidge took number 10, where he lived until his retirement. In 1923, Coolidge and his wife moved permanently to Center Sandwich, New Hampshire, where they had had a summer home since 1908.

In 1925–26, he served a term in the New Hampshire House of Representatives, and in 1926, he and his wife were among the founders of the Sandwich Home Industries, a local craftsmen's cooperative formed primarily through the efforts of Mrs. Coolidge. He died August 8, 1928 in Center Sandwich following a brief illness. His funeral was held in King's Chapel in Boston with burial in Mount Auburn Cemetery.

Mrs. Coolidge continued her work in supporting local craftsmen and was the founder of the League of New Hampshire Craftsmen in 1932. She died on October 6, 1952 in Groton, Massachusetts.
