= Harold Jefferson Coolidge Sr. =

American lawyer (1870–1934)

Harold Jefferson Coolidge
- Born: January 22, 1870; Nice, France
- Died: July 31, 1934 (aged 64); Boston, Massachusetts, U.S.
- Education: Harvard College
- Spouse: Edith Lawrence (m. 1903)
- Children: Harold Jefferson Coolidge Jr. Lawrence Coolidge
- Parent(s): Joseph Randolph Coolidge; Julia Gardner
- Relatives: John G. Coolidge (brother); Archibald Coolidge (brother); J. Randolph Coolidge Jr. (brother); Julian L. Coolidge (brother)

Harold Jefferson Coolidge (January 22, 1870 – July 31, 1934) was an American lawyer. He was the brother of Archibald Cary Coolidge and father of Harold Jefferson Coolidge Jr.

== Early life ==
Coolidge was born in Nice, France, on January 22, 1870. His parents were Harvard University Law School graduate Joseph Randolph Coolidge and Julia (née Gardner) Coolidge, both from prominent and wealthy Boston Brahmin families. His siblings included U.S. Minister to Nicaragua John Gardner Coolidge, professor and diplomat Archibald Cary Coolidge, architect J. Randolph Coolidge Jr. and mathematician and fellow Harvard professor Julian Lowell Coolidge.

His father was a great-grandson of the 3rd United States President Thomas Jefferson, through his maternal grandparents, Thomas Mann Randolph Jr. and Martha Jefferson Randolph. His paternal uncle was Thomas Jefferson Coolidge, the Boston businessman and U.S. Minister to France. Harold's great-uncles were Thomas Jefferson Randolph, George Wythe Randolph, and his grandfather, Joseph Coolidge, was a distant relative of President Calvin Coolidge.

Through his mother, Harold was the nephew of John Lowell Gardner II. His mother and uncle John were the grandchildren of merchant Joseph Peabody, one of the wealthiest men in the United States at the time of his death in 1844.

Coolidge attended school in Boston before studying in Germany and at Harvard University, where he was graduated in 1892, with an A.B. magna cum laude.

== Career ==
He was admitted to the bar in 1896 and worked as partner in the firm of Loring and Coolidge.

In 1926, the future King of Sweden Gustaf VI Adolf and his wife, Lady Louise Mountbatten, were the guests of Coolidge during the visit to Boston, where Coolidge showed them The House of the Seven Gables.

== Personal life ==
On February 19, 1903, Coolidge was married to Edith Lawrence (1879–1975), the daughter of Amory Appleton Lawrence and granddaughter of abolitionist Amos Adams Lawrence. Her uncle was Bishop William Lawrence and her aunt was Harriet Lawrence Hemenway, founder of the Massachusetts Audubon Society. Her first cousins included Bishops William Appleton Lawrence, and Frederic Cunningham Lawrence. Together, they were the parents of two sons and a daughter:

- Harold Jefferson Coolidge Jr. (1904–1985), a prominent zoologist.
- Lawrence Coolidge (1905–1950), who married Victoria Stuart Tytus (1909–1996), the daughter of Robb de Peyster Tytus, in 1934.
- Emily Fairfax Stone (1907 -1991), who married Harry Adsit Woodruf and later Thomas Archibald Stone

Harold Jefferson Coolidge Sr. died on July 31, 1934, and is buried at the Mount Auburn Cemetery in Cambridge, Massachusetts. After his death, his widow remarried U.S. General and Chief of the Military Intelligence Division Sherman Miles (1882–1966) in 1954.

== Publications ==
- Archibald Cary Coolidge, Life and Letters, 1932
- Thoughts on Thomas Jefferson, or, What Jefferson was not, 1936 (posthumous, edited by Lawrence Coolidge).
