= A Treatise on the Circle and the Sphere =

In-depth exploration of circles, spheres, and inversive geometry by Julian Coolidge

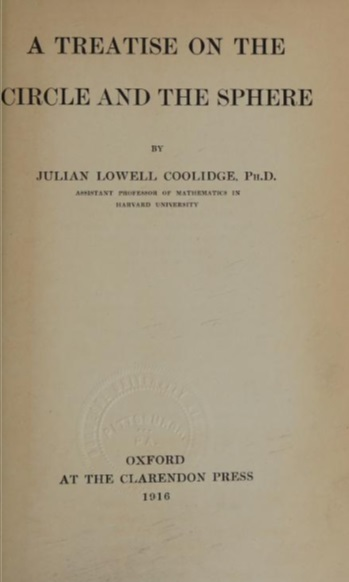
- Author: Julian Coolidge
- Publication date: 1916

A Treatise on the Circle and the Sphere is a mathematics book on circles, spheres, and inversive geometry. It was written by Julian Coolidge and published by the Clarendon Press in 1916. The Chelsea Publishing Company published a corrected reprint in 1971. After the American Mathematical Society acquired Chelsea Publishing it was reprinted again in 1997.

== Topics ==
As is now standard in inversive geometry, the book extends the Euclidean plane to its one-point compactification, and considers Euclidean lines to be a degenerate case of circles, passing through the point at infinity. It identifies every circle with the inversion through it, and studies circle inversions as a group, the group of Möbius transformations of the extended plane. Another key tool used by the book are the "tetracyclic coordinates" of a circle, quadruples of complex numbers $a, b, c, d$ describing the circle in the complex plane as the solutions to the equation $az\bar z+bz+c\bar z+d=0$. It applies similar methods in three dimensions to identify spheres (and planes as degenerate spheres) with the inversions through them, and to coordinatize spheres by "pentacyclic coordinates".

Other topics described in the book include:

- Tangent circles and pencils of circles
- Steiner chains, rings of circles tangent to two given circles
- Ptolemy's theorem on the sides and diagonals of quadrilaterals inscribed in circles
- Triangle geometry, and circles associated with triangles, including the nine-point circle, Brocard circle, and Lemoine circle
- The Problem of Apollonius on constructing a circle tangent to three given circles, and the Malfatti problem of constructing three mutually-tangent circles, each tangent to two sides of a given triangle
- The work of Wilhelm Fiedler on "cyclography", constructions involving circles and spheres
- The Mohr–Mascheroni theorem, that in straightedge and compass constructions, it is possible to use only the compass
- Laguerre transformations, analogues of Möbius transformations for oriented projective geometry
- Dupin cyclides, shapes obtained from cylinders and tori by inversion

== Legacy ==
At the time of its original publication this book was called encyclopedic, and "likely to become and remain the standard for a long period". It has since been called a classic, in part because of its unification of aspects of the subject previously studied separately in synthetic geometry, analytic geometry, projective geometry, and differential geometry. At the time of its 1971 reprint, it was still considered "one of the most complete publications on the circle and the sphere", and "an excellent reference".
