= The Stevens–Coolidge Place =

Garden and historic house in Essex County, Massachusetts

Coordinates: 42°40′53″N 71°7′5″W

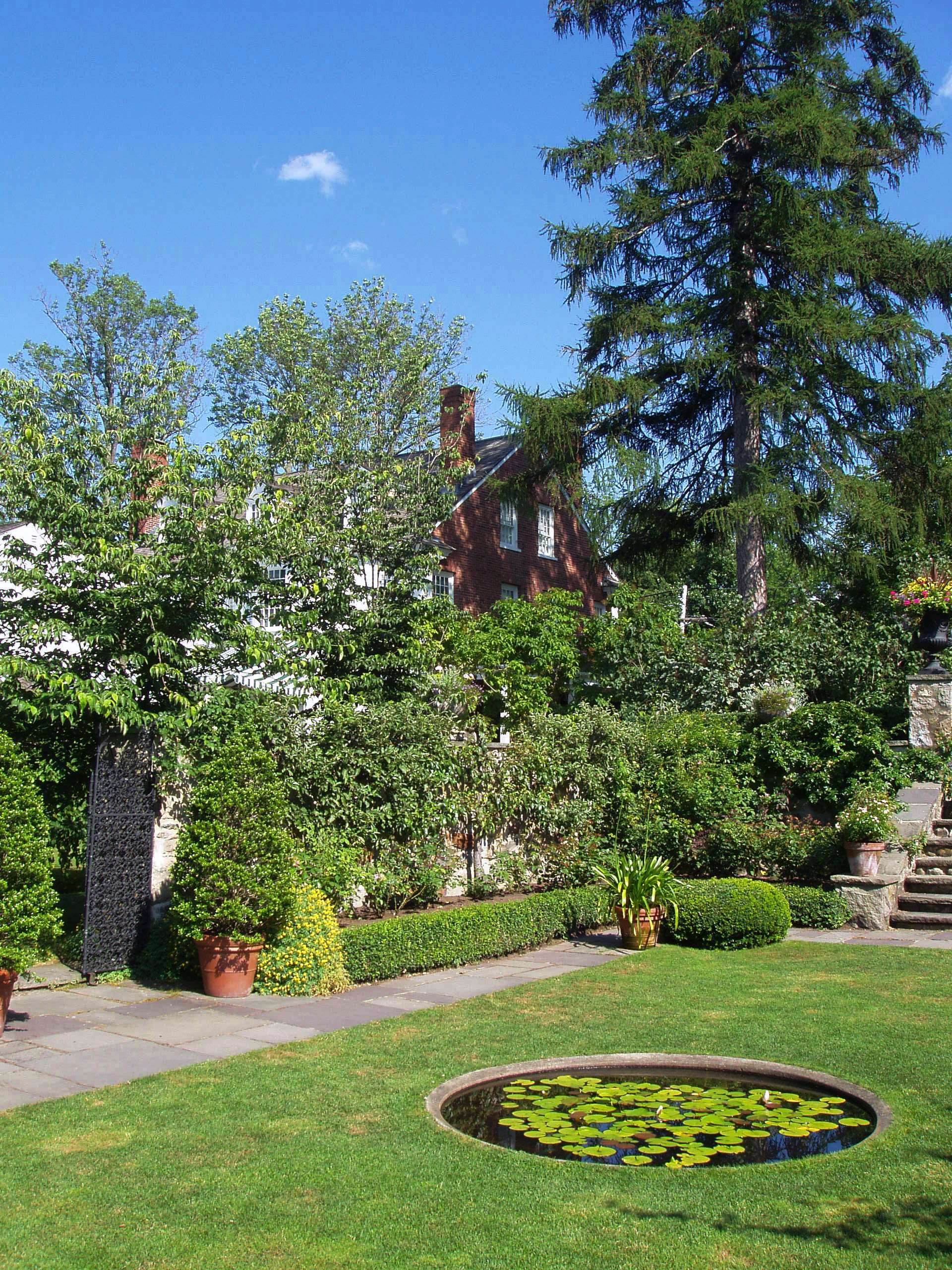
- Walled rose garden, looking from rear towards the house.
- Interactive map of The Stevens–Coolidge Place
- Website: Official website

The Stevens–Coolidge House and Gardens, formerly known as Ashdale Farm, is a garden and historic house located on 91 acres (37 ha) of land at 153 Chickering Road in North Andover, a town in Essex County, Massachusetts. Helen Stevens Coolidge's family first acquired the farm in 1729, and from 1914 to 1962 it served as a summer home that she shared with her husband John Gardner Coolidge, American diplomat and one time Minister to Nicaragua (as well as a descendant of Thomas Jefferson, and nephew of Isabella Stewart Gardner), and their family. The property and house is now a nonprofit museum operated by The Trustees of Reservations.

Between 1914 and 1918, Colonial Revival architect Joseph Everett Chandler remodeled two farmhouses from the late Federal period of American architecture to form the house that stands on the property. Chandler also enhanced the design of the landscape, which eventually included a perennial garden, a kitchen, flower garden, and a rose garden (all in the Colonial Revival style). A potager garden (kitchen garden in the French style), with a brick serpentine wall and a complex of greenhouses were also built. The collections inside the house include Asian artifacts such as Chinese porcelain, as well as American furniture, and European decorative arts.

In 2020, a project began to restore the murals inside the house.

== Gallery ==
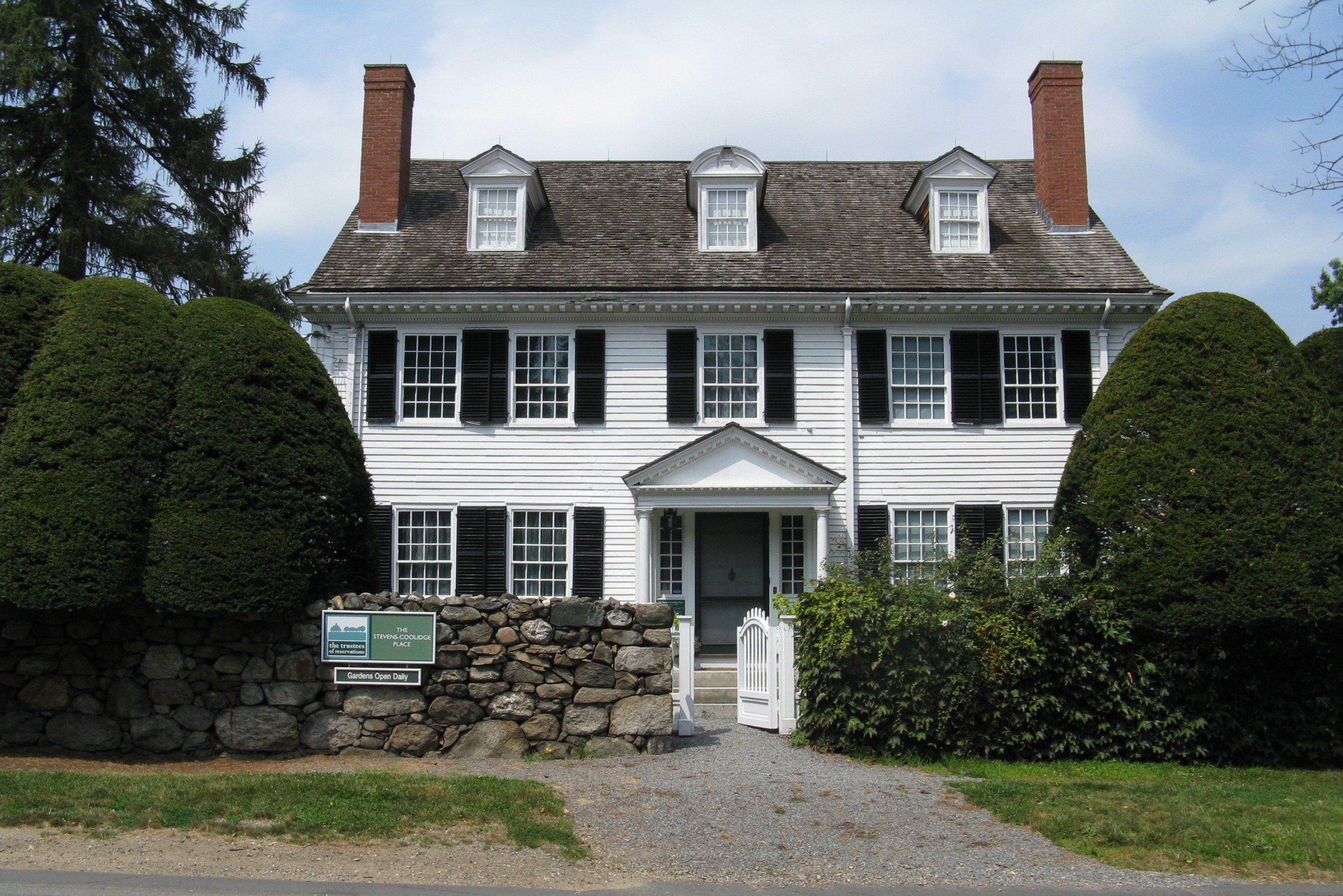
Original house which now serves as a museum.

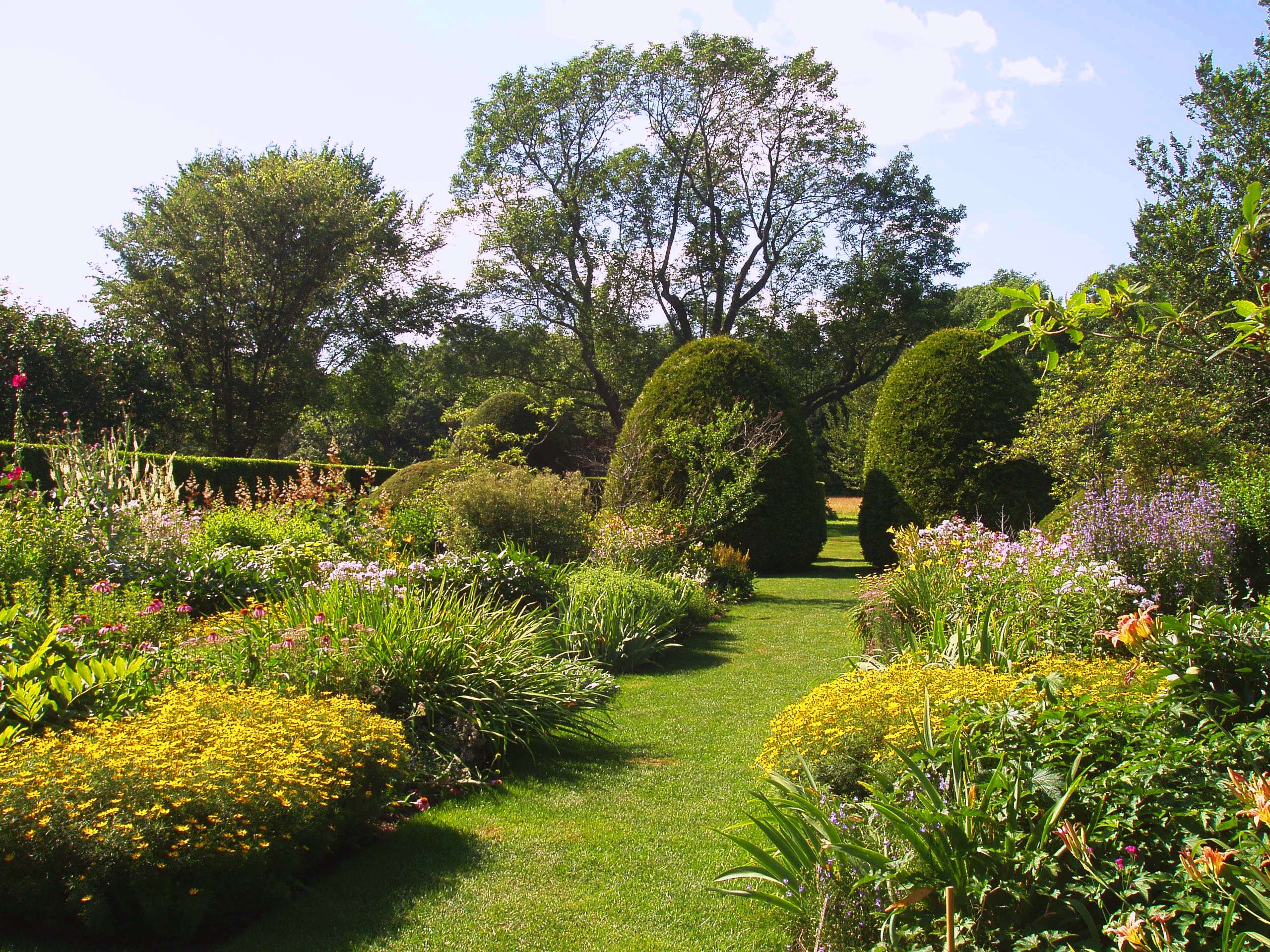
Perennial garden, looking back from house.

Ash tree beyond the perennial garden, by the hayfields, in winter.

== Bibliography ==
- Forsyth, Holly Kerr. Gardens of Eden: Among the World's Most Beautiful Gardens. Carlton, Vic.: Miegunyah Press, 2009.
