= Grace Tabor =

American landscape architect and author

- Born: March 24, 1874; Cuba, New York
- Died: October 15, 1971 (aged 97)
- Resting place: Huntington, New York
- Occupations: landscape architect, writer
- Writing career
- Years active: 1905-1951
- Subject: gardening
- Notable works: The Landscape Gardening Book (1911), Come into the Garden (1921)

Ina Grace Tabor (24 March 1874 – 15 October 1971) was an American landscape architect, designer, writer, and editor. She was one of the first women to identify herself professionally as a landscape architect. She is best known as the author on the subjects of landscape design and horticulture. She is the author of ten garden books, most of which were published between 1910 and 1921.

== Personal life and education ==
Grace Tabor was born on 24 March 1874 in Cuba, New York. She studied at the Arts Students League and the New York School of Applied Design for Women both in New York. Tabor acquired her horticultural training at Harvard University's Arnold Arboretum. In 1905, Tabor began writing and drawing plans for such publications as The Garden Magazine and Country Life. She became associate editor of The Garden Magazine (later The American Home); Assistant to the Director, New York State School of Applied Agriculture on Long Island.

Tabor spent most of her adult life in the New York City area. Upon retiring, she moved to south, residing in various states.

== Work ==
In 1914-1915 Tabor started to practice landscape architecture privately, principally around New York City. She preferred to design gardens for people of average income rather than for the wealthy. As a result, her gardens were not recorded in publications as extensively as more extravagant landscapes. Because of this professional background the National War Garden Commission sent her on a promotional lecture tour during World War I in the interest of food production in War Gardens. After World War I she was made chairman of the Agricultural Section of Miss Anne Morgan's Committee for devastated France and served in this capacity during the Committee's existence.

In 1920 Tabor wrote a book Come into the Garden where she talked about the overuse of evergreens, encouraging gardeners to not only deliberately design their spaces but also add something more than shrubs and evergreens, for example, daffordills and phlox flowers.

In 1923 Tabor as a landscape architect was asked by the Woman’s Home Companion magazine to establish a Garden Department in this magazine and to work part-time as its editor. She began a garden column for the magazine that ran until 1941. Through the Woman’s Home Companion, which was at the time among the most influential women’s magazines in the country, Tabor reached a wide audience. She contrasted the old and new styles of gardening with a graphic rendering of a landscape before and after renovations, labeling the “before” illustration as a “mistake in landscaping”. Writing for Woman’s Home Companion Gabor was considered the doyenne of a cluster of female advice-givers on the subject.

Tabor authored ten garden books, most of which were published between 1910 and 1921. Among her most important titles should be mentioned The Landscape Gardening Book (1911) and Come into the Garden (1921), both of which interpreted design principles for a general audience. In her book Old-Fashioned Gardening (1913) Tabor introduced readers to America’s garden heritage, reflecting the popularity of the Colonial Revival. She was the first to recognize that all old-fashioned gardens are not beautiful and suggested that “by reason of their antiquity we have accepted their beauty as a matter of course.” In 1951 Tabor published her last book Making a Garden of Perennials.

In 1932 Tabor proposed planting 10 million new trees in America to celebrate the bicentennial of George Washington’s birth.

She was also an editor of The National Plant, Flower & Fruit Guild Magazine. She also contributed significantly to the magazine House and Garden, writing a monthly garden column and in-depth advanced articles on gardening.

== Publications ==
- 1911 – The landscape gardening book, wherein are set down the simple laws of beauty and utility which should guide the development of all grounds
- 1911 – The garden primer; a practical handbook on the elements of gardening for beginners
- 1912 – Making a garden to bloom this year
- 1912 – Making the grounds attractive with shrubs
- 1912 – Making the grounds attractive with shrubbery
- 1912 – Making a bulb garden
- 1913 – Old-Fashioned gardening; a history and a reconstruction
- 1913 – Suburban gardens
- 1916 – Wonderdays and wonderways through flowerland; a summer adventure of once upon a time
- 1921 – Come into the garden
- 1934 – Herbs in cooking
- 1951 – Making a garden of perennials
