= Colonial Revival garden =

Type of garden design

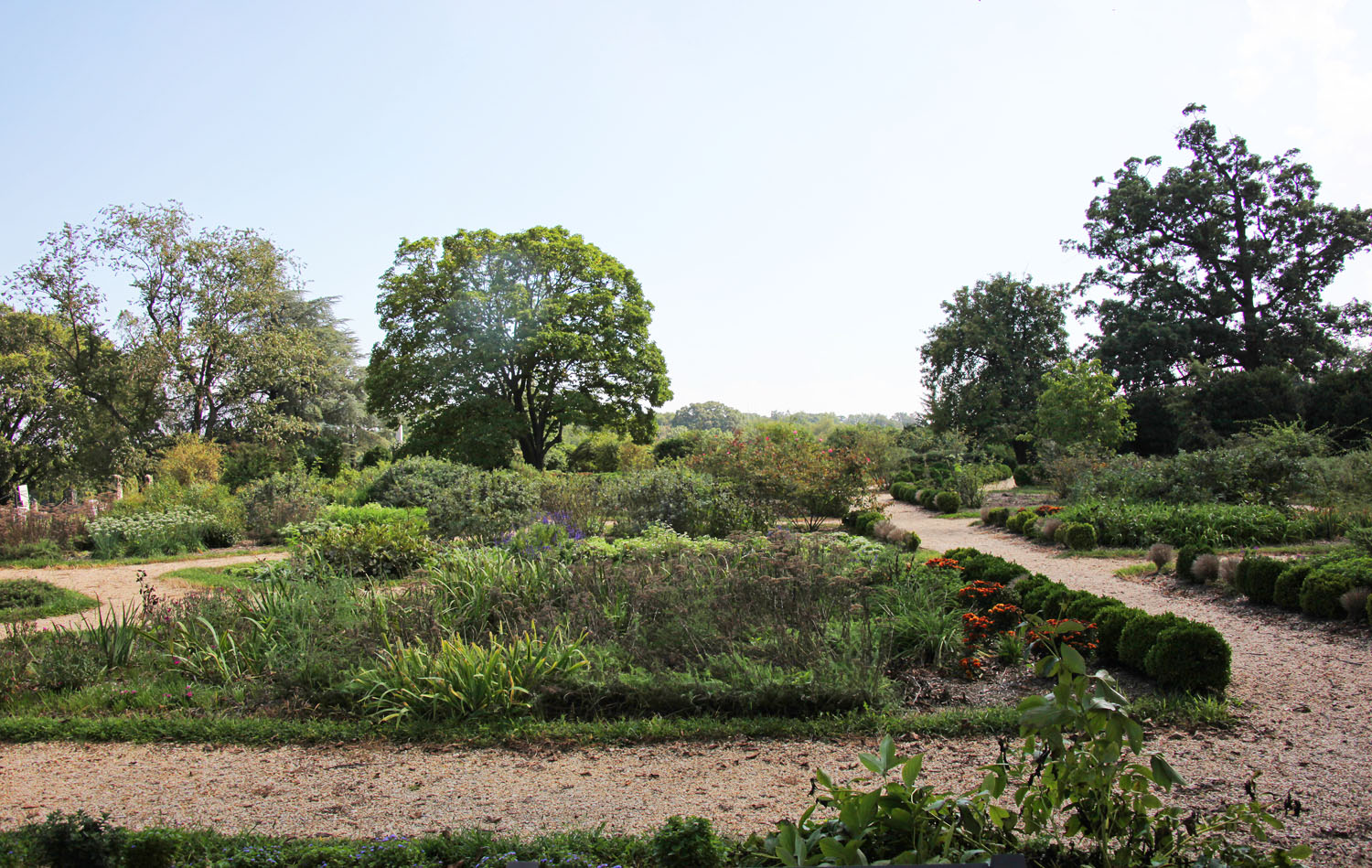
The Colonial Revival flower garden at Arlington House (the Robert E. Lee Memorial) at Arlington National Cemetery in Virginia.

A Colonial Revival garden is a garden design intended to evoke the garden design typical of the Colonial period of Australia or the United States. The Colonial Revival garden is typified by simple rectilinear beds, straight (rather than winding) pathways through the garden, and perennial plants from the fruit, ornamental flower, and vegetable groups. The garden is usually enclosed, often by low walls, fences, or hedges. The Colonial Revival gardening movement was an important development in the gardening movement in the United States.

== The American colonial garden ==
Generalizing about the common house garden in the colonial period in the United States is difficult, as garden plantings and even design varied considerably depending on the time period, wealth, climate, colonial heritage (whether British, French, or Spanish), and the purpose to which the garden was to be put (vegetable, flower, herb, etc.). Because of the overwhelmingly strong British influence in colonial America, the "colonial garden" generally refers to the most common type of garden found in the 13 British colonies. Colonial-era gardens in the southern colonies often exhibited the same design as those in the north. Gardens of the wealthy, however, often employed newer gardening ideas, such as the landscape garden or English garden.

Colonial gardens tended to be small and close to the house. A straight walkway generally extended on a line equal with the entrance to the house through the center of the garden. (This layout was often abandoned in the north, where it was more important to site the garden so the building protected it from northwest winds.) Perpendicular straight paths often extended from this central path. Planting beds were usually square or rectangular although circular beds were also seen. In almost all cases, beds were raised to provide good drainage. Beds could sometimes be bordered with low-growing, neat plants such as chive or pinks. In areas with a Spanish influence, orchards generally were attached to the garden.

The paths in the Colonial American garden were generally of brick, gravel, or stone. Brick was more commonly used in the south, however. Enclosure of the garden was common, often with boxwood hedges or wooden fences. Picket fences were common, but boxwood was usually used only in the south and in the later colonial period.

Plantings in colonial gardens were generally not separated by type. Fruits, herbs, ornamental flowers, and vegetables were usually mixed together in the same planting bed. Ornamental flowers were often grown closer to the house, however, while vegetables which needed space to grow (such as corn, green beans, or pumpkins) would often be grown in larger beds further away. Fruit trees would sometimes line paths, to provide shade and produce, but fruit bushes were as common as fruit trees and always planted in the interior of the garden. Fruit trees would also be planted along the external border of the garden (while wealthier people with more land planted them in orchards). Ornamental shrubs were rare, but could include azalea, lilac, and mock orange.

A stand-alone herb garden was uncommon in the United States. However, Colonial American herb gardens were generally of the same design as other gardens. They were usually less than 5 feet (1.5 m) across, and often consisted of four square plots separated by gravel paths. More commonly, herbs were mixed in with flowers and other plants. Commonly planted herbs included angelica, basil, burnet, calendula, caraway, chamomile, chervil, coriander, comfrey, dill, fennel, licorice, mint, nasturtium, parsley, sage, and tarragon. Herbs to a Colonial American did not have the same meaning as the words does in modern America. To colonists, "herb" meant not only savory plants added to dishes to enhance flavor but included medicinal plants as well as greens (such as nasturtiums and calendulas) meant to be eaten raw or cooked as part of a salad.

== The Australian colonial garden ==
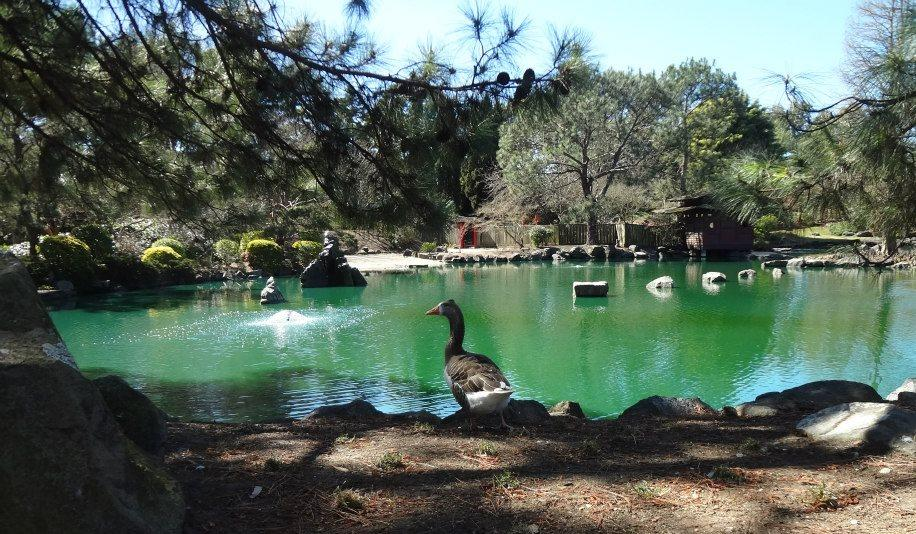
Auburn Botanical Gardens, with a view of its lake

The first botanical gardens in Australia were founded early in the 19th century. The Royal Botanic Gardens, Sydney, 1816; the Royal Tasmanian Botanical Gardens, 1818; the Royal Botanic Gardens, Melbourne, 1845; Adelaide Botanic Gardens, 1854; and Brisbane Botanic Gardens, 1855. These were established essentially as colonial gardens of economic botany and acclimatisation. The Auburn Botanical Gardens, 1977, located in Sydney's western suburbs, are one of the popular and diverse botanical gardens in the Greater Western Sydney area.

== History of the Colonial Revival garden movement ==
The Colonial Revival gardening movement traces its origins to the Centennial International Exhibition of 1876, the first official World's Fair held in the United States. The Centennial Exposition was held in Philadelphia, Pennsylvania, from May 10 to November 10, 1876, and it celebrated the 100th anniversary of the signing of the Declaration of Independence. Although the Colonial Revival gardening movement had already begun a short time before, the Centennial Exposition created intense interest in all things colonial — including the colonial garden.

Colonial Revival gardens were widely popular from the late 1800s to the late 1930s. The Colonial Revival gardening movement occurred primarily in the eastern United States (where colonial heritage was strongest), although the gardens were constructed across the country. A number of writers published highly influential books about the Colonial Revival garden. Among these were Alice Morse Earle's Old Time Gardens (1901), Alice Morse Earle's Sun Dials and Roses of Yesterday (1902), and Grace Tabor's Old-Fashioned Gardening (1913).

Colonial Revival gardens do not seek to imitate or replicate actual colonial gardens or colonial planting schemes. Rather, they are (as historical gardening expert Denise Wiles Adams notes) "romanticized" versions of colonial gardens. As Butler, Smalling, and Wilson put it: "Colonial Revival gardens were never intended to duplicate the gardens' historical appearance. They are twentieth-century gardens designed to meet contemporary needs, the artistic creations of very accomplished landscape architects that value aesthetic quality over historical accuracy." In terms of layout, the Colonial Revival garden still emphasizes straight lines and symmetry, and a central axis aligned with the house. Although plants typical of the colonial era are emphasized, many Colonial Revival gardens also soften the line where the house foundation meets the soil through the use of "foundation plantings" such as low evergreen shrubs.

Modern Colonial Revival gardens tend to emphasize boxwood hedges as edging rather than fences. It is more common to see early 20th century favorites like delphiniums, hollyhocks, and violets used than historic plants. In the late 1800s and early 1900s, many Colonial Revival gardens were planted with brightly colored exotic plants which were not part of the colonial experience. These vibrantly colored plants were part of the Victorian era gardening legacy. But in the late 1900s and early 2000s, many Colonial Revival gardens have removed these exotic plants in favor of a more authentic colonial garden.

Colonial Revival gardens also usually incorporate a "feature" like an arbor, bench, or fountain at the center of the garden where the paths intersect. Such features were elements of the late colonial period only.

== Examples ==
Several notable examples exist of Colonial Revival gardens, most of them located on the east coast of the United States. They include:

- Arlington House, the Robert E. Lee Memorial, on the grounds of Arlington National Cemetery in Arlington County, Virginia
- Bassett Hall, a farmhouse located near Williamsburg, Virginia
- William Blount Mansion in Knoxville, Tennessee
- Colonial Williamsburg, located near Williamsburg, Virginia
- Hamilton House in South Berwick, Maine
- Mount Vernon, plantation home of George Washington located near Alexandria, Virginia
- Old Stone House in Washington, D.C.
- The Stevens-Coolidge Place in North Andover, Massachusetts

== See also ==
- Colonial Revival architecture
- Revivalism (architecture)

== Bibliography ==
- Adams, Denise Wiles. "Garden Designs for Historic Homes." Old-House Journal. September–October 2005, p. 35-38.
- Aitken, Richard & Looker, Michael (2002). The Oxford Companion to Australian Gardens. Melbourne: Oxford University Press. ISBN 978-0-19-553644-7.
- Bennett, Paul. Garden Lover's Guide to the South. New York: Princeton Architectural Press, 2000.
- Brinkley, M. Kent and Chappell, Gordon W. The Gardens of Colonial Williamsburg. Williamsburg, Va.: Colonial Williamsburg Foundation, 1996.
- Butler, Sara A.; Smalling, Jr., Walter; and Wilson, Richard Guy. The Campus Guide: University of Virginia. New York: Princeton Architectural Press, 1999.
- Cheek, Richard and Favretti, Rudy J. Gardens & Landscapes of Virginia. Little Compton, R.I.: Fort Church Publishers, 1993.
- Clayton, Virginia Tuttle. The Once and Future Gardener: Garden Writing From the Golden Age of Magazines, 1900-1940. Boston, Mass.: David R. Godine, 2000.
- Damrosch, Barbara. Theme Gardens. New York: Workman Pub., 2001.
- Emmet, Alan. So Fine a Prospect: Historic New England Gardens. Lebanon, N.H.: University Press of New England, 1997.
- Favretti, Rudy J. and Favretti, Joy P. Landscapes and Gardens for Historic Buildings. Walnut Creek, Calif.: AltaMira Press, 1997.
- Forsyth, Holly Kerr. Gardens of Eden: Among the World's Most Beautiful Gardens. Carlton, Vic.: Miegunyah Press, 2009.
- Griswold, Mac and Foley, Roger. Washington's Gardens at Mount Vernon: Landscape of the Inner Man. Boston, Mass.: Houghton Mifflin, 1999.
- Johnson, Vicki. "Symmetry in the Garden." Old House Interiors. May 2002, p. 72-75.
- Karson, Robin S. Fletcher Steele, Landscape Architect: An Account of the Gardenmaker's Life, 1885-1971. Amherst, Mass.: University of Massachusetts Press, 2003.
- Kowalchik, Claire; Hylton, William H.; and Carr, Anna. Rodale's Illustrated Encyclopedia of Herbs. Emmaus, Pa.: Rodale Press, 1998.
- Kunst, Scott G. "Victorian Vegetables." Old-House Journal. April 1987, p. 46-51.
- McGuire, Diane Kostial. Gardens of America: Three Centuries of Design. Charlottesville, Va.: Thomasson-Grant, 1989.
- Phillips, Ellen and Burrell, C. Colston. Rodale's Illustrated Encyclopedia of Perennials. Emmaus, Pa.: Rodale Press, 1993.
- Seeber, Barbara H. A City of Gardens: Glorious Public Gardens In and Around the Nation's Capital. Sterling, Va.: Capital Books, 2004.
- Tankard, Judith B. "Ellen Biddle Shipman's Colonial Revival Garden Style." In Re-Creating the American Past: Essays on the Colonial Revival. Richard Guy Wilson, Shaun Eyring, and Kenny Marotta, eds. Charlottesville, Va.: University Press of Virginia, 2006.
- Taylor, Patrick. The Oxford Companion to the Garden. New York: Oxford University Press, 2008.
- Thalimer, Carol and Thalimer, Dan. Quick Escapes, Atlanta: 27 Weekend Getaways From the Gateway to the South. Guilford, Con..: Globe Pequot Press, 2005.
- Wright, Renee. Virginia Beach, Richmond & Tidewater Virginia including Williamsburg, Norfolk and Jamestown: A Great Destination. Woodstock, Vt.: Countryman Press, 2010.
