= Eliska Haskova Coolidge =

Czech-American government official

- Eliška Hašková Coolidge
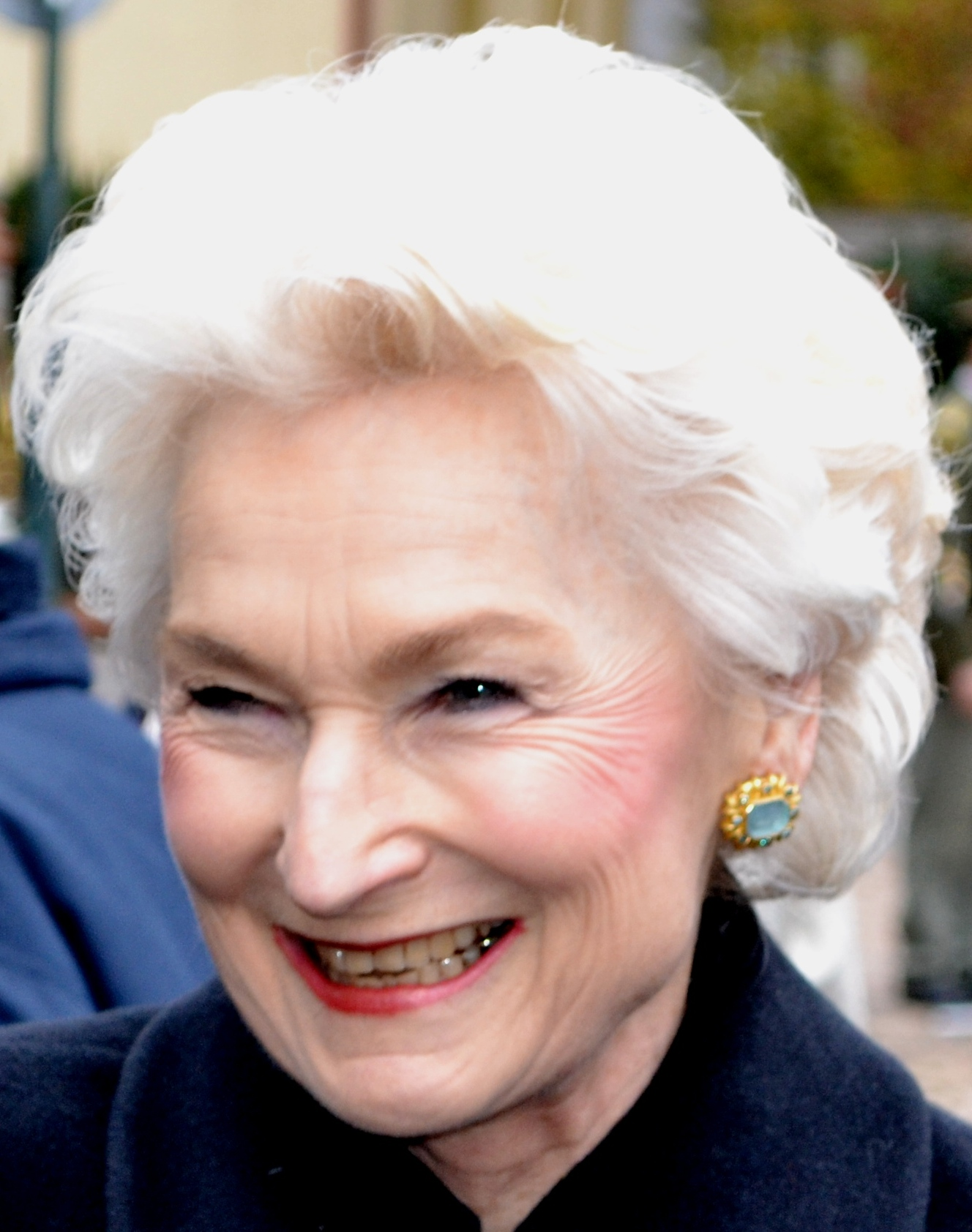
- Born: March 26, 1941 (age 85); Prague, Bohemia and Moravia (now Czech Republic)
- Education: Georgetown University; School of Foreign Service
- Occupation: Director
- Website: ehc.cz

Eliska Haskova Coolidge or Eliska Hasek Coolidge (born Eliška Hašková; March 26, 1941) is a former Czech-American official, a member of the White House staff (Central Files) and later in charge of the Presidential Correspondence with Institutions and Individuals and also part of the internal speechwriting team (1963-1981).

From 1981 to 1990 she served at the United States Department of State.

== Early life ==
Coolidge was born in Prague. Her grandfather, František Hašek was Owner and President of the Hašek Bank and Prague Stock Exchange President who was assassinated by the Nazis on June 5, 1942 for refusing to sell to the Nazis his majority share in Melantrich, a Czech publishing company. In January 1948 her father, Josef Hašek, was invited to the United States to recommend an expansion of trade relations between the United States and Czechoslovakia. He remained in the U.S. after the 1948 Communist coup d'état.

After the Communists confiscated her family properties, Eliška escaped with her mother and brother in 1949 to Germany and later to France. On October 12, 1950 she alone joined her father in the U.S.

== Career ==
Coolidge graduated cum laude from the Georgetown University School of Foreign Service in 1963. After graduation, she joined the White House as a staff assistant. In 1964, she served in the Central Files Division. She later became director of the Office of Presidential Messages and was a member of the President's speechwriting team until 1981. From 1981 to 1990, she worked at the Department of State, serving on the personal staff of Secretary of State Alexander Haig and later, under Secretary of State George Shultz, as Congressional Liaison Officer for the Inter-American Bureau, Assistant Chief of Protocol of the U.S., and as Alternate Delegate to the Organization of American States. She retired from government service in 1990.

After the fall of the Iron Curtain, Coolidge took an early retirement so as to be free to travel to her native Czech Republic where she now teaches "The Art and Management of Social Skills, Diplomatic and Business Protocol." Her clients include top government officials, lawyers, businessmen and the general public. Her courses are held at the Hotel Mandarin Oriental Prague.

As owner of Coolidge Services Coolidge is an honorary member of multiple organizations and an avid supporter of Czech-American relations. Coolidge is a strong advocate for corporate social responsibility, ethical conduct and good manners. As a member of the non-profit organization Eticka vychova, o.p.s., she initiated the project "Adopt a School for Ethics in our Children and Trust in our Society" (ASET) under the sponsorship of the Ministry of Education, and in cooperation with the United States Chamber of Commerce where she serves on the Leadership Council. She is a member of the Faculty of the Prague Leadership Institute and lectures for AIPES, affiliated with the Fund for American Studies (TFAS). She is a frequent speaker at various domestic and international conferences. Coolidge is a member of the first mentoring program for women in the Czech Republic, Minerva 21, and of the Advisory Council of Zamek Liten, z.s. She serves on the jury of “OCP,” which annually selects the most successful women in Czech business. She is Patron of the project “MUZ” (Manual for Successful Women) and Helas Ladies Club.

In 2003 she was awarded as "Outstanding Czech Woman in the World" by the Senate of the Parliament of the Czech Republic and Charles University. In 2006 Coolidge ran for the Czech Senate under the Civic Democratic Party (ODS). After winning the first round, she lost by a narrow margin in the runoffs.

In 2005 she published her biography "Pět amerických prezidentů, česká babička a já" (Five U.S. Presidents, My Czech Grandmother, and I), which became a bestseller in the Czech Republic. An updated version was released in December 2016.

In the U.S. Presidential Elections 2016, Coolidge from the beginning strongly supported President Donald Trump.

== Personal life ==
In 1977 Eliska Hasek married an American investment banker, Nicholas Jefferson Coolidge, and two years later gave birth to her daughter Alexandra. Divorced after twenty years of marriage, she now divides her time between Prague and Washington. In 2016, she became a grandmother to her first grandson—Jonah Randolph Holzer.
