= Harold Jefferson Coolidge Jr. =

American zoologist (1904–1985)

Harold Jefferson Coolidge Jr. (January 15, 1904 – February 15, 1985) was an American zoologist and a founding director of the International Union for Conservation of Nature (IUCN) as well as of the World Wildlife Fund (WWF).

== Early life ==
Coolidge was born in Boston, Massachusetts. His father Harold Jefferson Coolidge Sr. (1870–1934) was a brother of Archibald Cary Coolidge and Julian Coolidge. Coolidge was also a descendant of Thomas Jefferson, through Jefferson's daughter Martha Jefferson Randolph.

Coolidge studied at Milton Academy and at the University of Arizona before entering Harvard. Originally, he had wanted to become a diplomat, like his uncle Archibald Cary Coolidge, but he soon turned to biology, specializing in primatology. After getting a B.S. from Harvard in 1927, he worked as curator at Harvard's Museum of Comparative Zoology.

== Career ==
Coolidge participated in the Harvard Medical Expedition to Africa in 1926/27 to Liberia and the Belgian Congo, from where he brought back a large gorilla that is still on display at the Museum of Comparative Zoology. In 1929 he published "A revision of the genus Gorilla", which forms the basis of the modern taxonomy of the genus Gorilla.

Coolidge participated in the Kelley-Roosevelt Expedition to Asia in 1928/29, and in 1937, he organized and led the Asiatic Primate Expedition through northwest Tonkin and northern Laos to study gibbons.

Coolidge also studied at the University of Cambridge, England. In 1933, he published the first detailed account of bonobos, elevating them to species rank (Pan paniscus). Ernst Schwarz had already published in 1929 a brief paper on them and had classified them as the subspecies Pan satyrus paniscus, based on a skull from the Belgian Congo discovered at a museum at Tervuren, Belgium. In 1982, twenty years after Schwarz's death, Coolidge claimed to have discovered that skull first and to have been "taxonomically scooped" by Schwarz.

=== Public service ===
During World War II, Coolidge served in the OSS, where he developed, amongst other things, a chemical shark repellent, overseeing Julia Child, who worked as his executive assistant on the project. He was awarded the Legion of Merit in 1945.

After the war, he became director of the Pacific Science Board of the U.S. National Academy of Sciences, a post he held until 1970. He was also a member of the U.S. delegation at the conference in Fontainebleau in France where the International Union for Conservation of Nature was founded, and was elected its first vice-president. From 1966 to 1972, he served as IUCN president. In 1961, he was also one of the founding directors of the World Wildlife Fund (WWF), and a WWF International Board member from 1971 to 1978. In 1980, Coolidge was awarded the J. Paul Getty Wildlife Conservation Prize for his work in nature conservation, one of many awards he got throughout his career.

== Personal life ==
He died at the hospital in Beverly, Massachusetts of complications after a fall and was buried at Thomas Jefferson's home, Monticello.

== Selected publications ==
- Coolidge, H.J.: "A revision of the genus Gorilla", Memoirs of the Museum of Comparative Zoology, vol 50, pp. 293–381, Harvard University 1929.
- Coolidge, H.J.: "Pan paniscus. Pigmy chimpanzee from south of the Congo river", American Journal of Physical Anthropology, 18(1), pp. 1–59; July/September 1933. Contains a translation of Schwarz's earlier report.
