= Snake in the Grass (1804 schooner) =

American schooner

History

United States of America
- Name: Snake in the Grass
- Owner: Originally: Captain Richard Hayden; May 1804: John and Richard Gardner, New York
- Builder: Captain Richard Hayden
- Launched: March 1804, Saybrook, Connecticut River
- Captured: 1804
- Fate: Condemned 1806

General characteristics
- Tons burthen: 10789/95 (bm)
- Length: 75 ft 6 in (23.0 m)
- Sail plan: Schooner
- Armament: 5 guns

Snake in the Grass was a schooner launched in March 1804 at Saybrook on the Connecticut River. She was sold to New York, sailed to Saint-Domingue, and fell prey to a French privateer. One of her crew smuggled out a letter from prison that reported that the French had captured two more American vessels, one after a sanguinary action, and were treating armed American vessels coming to Saint–Domingue as pirates. Snake in the Grass claimed recompense under the French spoliations claim procedure, but it is not clear how much, if anything, her claimants received.

== Career ==
Captain Richard Hayden built Snake in the Grass and quickly sold the schooner in May in New York, a procedure that he followed with several more ships. (Note: Captain Richard Hayden (J.772-1886), was a prominent member of the famous Essex shipbuilding family.)

Her new owners, John and Richard Gardner, of New York, registered her there on 9 May. They had her fitted out at Salem, Massachusetts, and armed her with five guns.

Under the command of Captain James Mansfield, she sailed to Saint-Domingue, where a French privateer captured her without a shot being fired. The French government, concerned with the rebellion there and vessels bringing arms to the rebels, had decided that any American vessel sailing to Saint-Domingue would be treated as a pirate. Snake in the Grass was taken to Guadeloupe, where she was condemned in 1806.

The other two vessels captured earlier were Rockland, Aikins or King, master, and Hopewell, Sesson, master. Their captor was Frebiskey, Captain Antawan. The action took place on 30 June 1804 at 27°38′N 61°57′W.

The owners of all three American vessels claimed recompense under the provisions of the French spoliation claims. A majority of the claims were for American vessels taken during the Quasi-War with France (1797–1801). However the claims also extended to any property the French had captured at any time. The French never paid the claims and eventually Congress appropriated funds, the last appropriation occurring on 24 February 1905. Many claims remained unsettled until 1924. Congress last considered the matter in 1955.

The claims for Snake in the Grass totalled $6,400. For Rockland the claims totalled $28,800, and for Hopewell they totalled $37,300. The US State Department Archives and a number of other US archives contain the claims documents submitted. These could provide detailed information about what happened, but searching for them would require tedious original research.
