= John Lowell Gardner =

American businessman

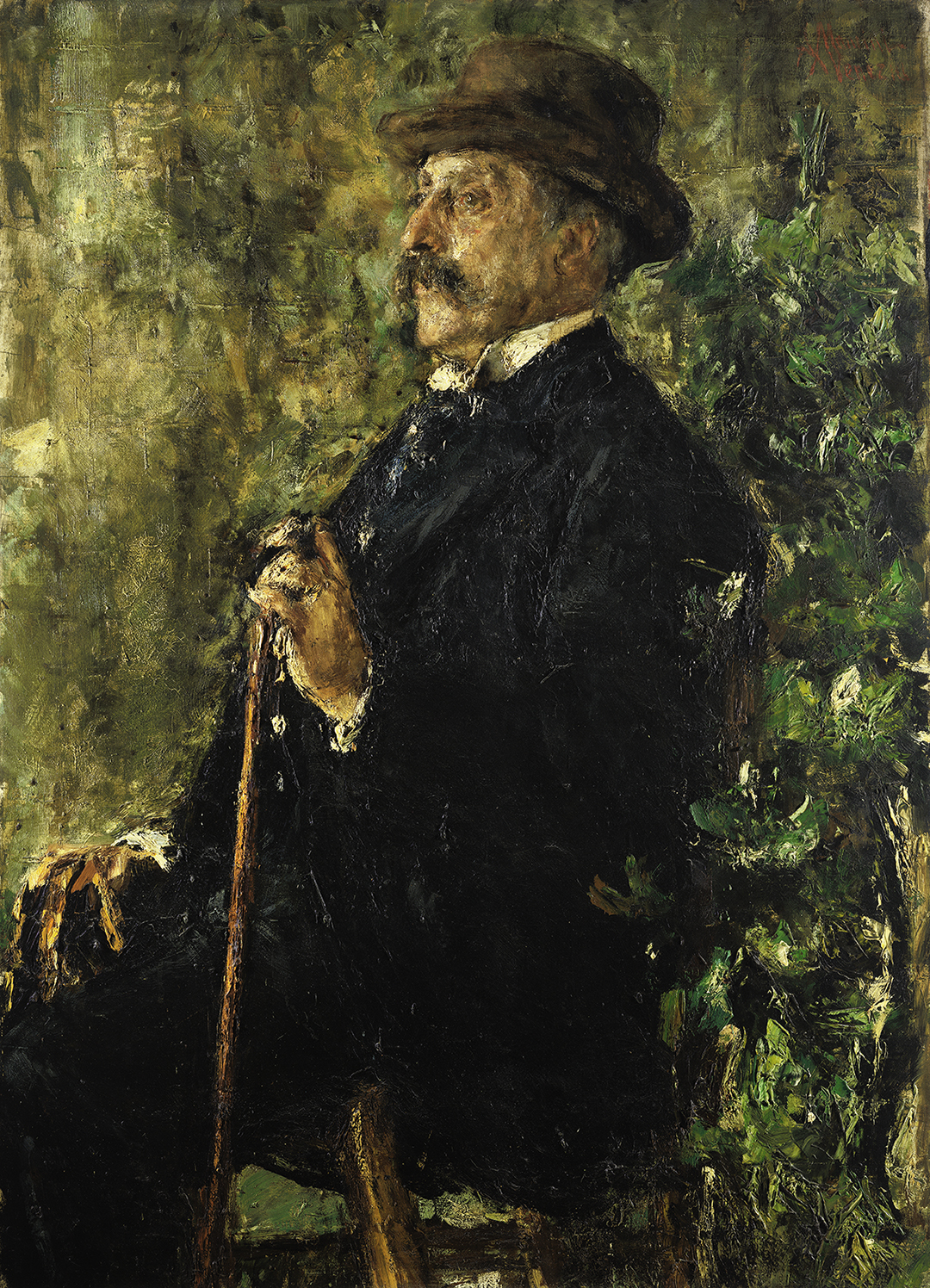
- Born: November 26, 1837; Brookline, Massachusetts
- Died: December 10, 1898 (aged 61); Brookline, Massachusetts
- Occupations: Merchant, Shipowner, Art collector
- Spouse: Isabella Stewart Gardner

John Lowell Gardner Jr. (November 26, 1837 – December 10, 1898) was an American businessman, art collector, and philanthropist. He and his wife, Isabella Stewart Gardner, were patrons of the arts whose collection is now housed in the Isabella Stewart Gardner Museum.

== Background ==
Gardner's mother, Catherine Endicott Peabody (1808–1883), of Brookline, Massachusetts, was the daughter of the Salem shipowner, Joseph Peabody (1757–1844), who made a fortune importing pepper from Sumatra and was one of the wealthiest men in the United States at the time of his death in 1844. Gardner's paternal grandfather, Samuel Pickering Gardner (1768–1843), descended from Thomas Gardner and from the father of Timothy Pickering. Through his paternal grandmother, Rebecca Russell Lowell, he descended from Percival Lowell who had arrived at Cape Ann in 1639.

After spending time at Harvard, Gardner joined his father's East Indies trading business.

The Gardners entered into partnership with Peabody, and their ships sailed many seas. Some of those ships were as follows (clipper ships are not linked): Arabia, Bunker Hill, California, Democrat, Duxbury, Eclipse, Gentleman, Grotius, Lenore, Lepanto, Lotos, Marquis de Somerulas, Mars, Monterey, Nabob, Napke, Naples, Pallas, Pioneer, Plant, Plato, Ruble, Sappho, Shawmut, St Paul, Snake in the Grass, Sumatra, Thetis, and Unicorn.

The younger Gardner had financial interests besides shipping, such as railroads (Chicago, Burlington and Quincy Railroad) and mining (Calumet and Hecla Mining Company). He supported the America's Cup defender, Puritan.

== Marriage and death ==
He married Isabella Stewart on April 10, 1860. They had one son, John Lowell Gardner III, who was born June 18, 1863. He died March 15, 1865. After their son's untimely death, the couple started to travel and collect.

In 1875, Gardner's brother, Joseph, died. He had been a widower since 1865. He left three young sons, including Augustus P. Gardner who was ten years old at the time. John and Isabella 'adopted' and raised the boys. Augustus accompanied them on some of their 'hunts' for collectibles.

On the evening of December 10, 1898, Gardner died from "apoplexy" (a stroke) at the Exchange Club in Boston.
