= Julian Coolidge =

American mathematician and historian (1873–1954)

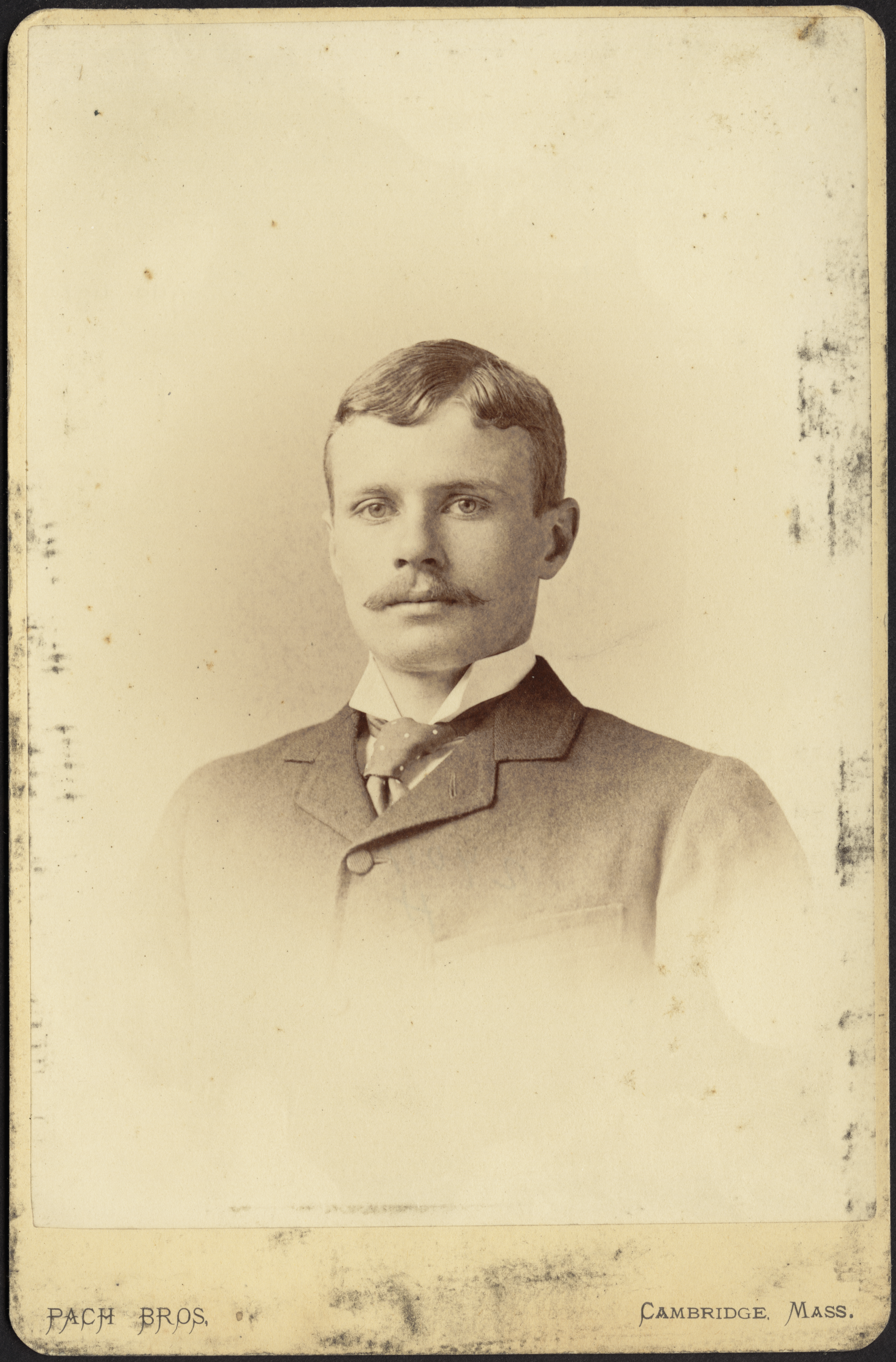
- Born: September 28, 1873; Brookline, Massachusetts, U.S.
- Died: March 5, 1954 (aged 80); Cambridge, Massachusetts, U.S.
- Education: Harvard University; Oxford University
- Known for: A Treatise on the Circle and the Sphere
- Awards: Legion of Honour – Knight (1919)
- Scientific career
- Fields: mathematics
- Workplaces: Harvard University
- Doctoral advisor: Eduard Study
- Doctoral students: Roger Arthur Johnson

Julian Lowell Coolidge (September 28, 1873 – March 5, 1954) was an American mathematician, historian, a professor and chairman of the Harvard University Mathematics Department.

== Biography ==
Born in Brookline, Massachusetts, he graduated from Harvard University and Balliol College, Oxford.

Between 1897 and 1899, Julian Coolidge taught at the Groton School, where one of his students was Franklin D. Roosevelt. He left Groton to accept a teaching position at Harvard and in 1902 was given an assistant professorship, but took two years off to further his education with studies in Turin, Italy before receiving his doctorate from the University of Bonn. Julian Coolidge then returned to teach at Harvard where he remained for his entire academic career, interrupted only by a year at the Sorbonne in Paris as an exchange professor.

During World War I, he served with the U.S. Army's Overseas Expeditionary Force in France, rising to the rank of major. In 1919, he was awarded a Knight of France's Legion of Honor.

Coolidge returned to teach at Harvard where he was awarded a full professorship. In 1927 he was appointed chairman of the Mathematics Department at Harvard, a position he held until his retirement in 1940. A Fellow of the American Academy of Arts and Sciences, Coolidge served as president of the Mathematical Association of America and vice-president of the American Mathematical Society. He authored several books on mathematics and on the history of mathematics. He was Master of Lowell House (one of Harvard's undergraduate residences) from 1930 to 1940. (Note: https://www.thecrimson.com/article/1954/3/6/first-lowell-housemaster-julian-coolidge-dies/)

Coolidge died in 1954 in Cambridge, Massachusetts, aged 80.

== Writings ==
- J. L. Coolidge (1909) The elements of non-Euclidean geometry, Oxford University Press.
- J. L. Coolidge (1916) A Treatise on the Circle and the Sphere, Oxford University Press.
- J. L. Coolidge (1924) The geometry of the complex domain, The Clarendon Press.
- J. L. Coolidge (1925) An introduction to mathematical probability, Oxford University Press.
- J. L. Coolidge (1931) A Treatise on Algebraic Plane Curves, Oxford University Press (Dover Publications 2004).
- J. L. Coolidge (1940) A history of geometrical methods, Oxford University Press (Dover Publications 2003).
- J. L. Coolidge (1945) History of the conic sections and quadric surfaces, The Clarendon Press.
- J. L. Coolidge (1949) The Mathematics Of Great Amateurs, Oxford University Press (Dover Publications 1963).

== See also ==
- Commandino's theorem
- Projective range
- Screw theory
- Spieker circle
