= Prentiss (surname) =

Prentiss is a surname, and may refer to:

- Adella Prentiss Hughes (1869–1950; née Prentiss), American pianist and impresario
- Ann Prentiss (1939–2010), American actress
- Anna Marie Prentiss, American archeologist
- Arthur Prentiss (1865 – c. 1941), American photographer
- Benjamin Prentiss (1819–1901), Union Army general in the American Civil War
- C. J. Prentiss (Carolyn Jean Prentiss) (1941–2024), American politician from Ohio
- Ed Prentiss (1908–1992), American radio actor
- Edith Prentiss (1952–2021), American disability rights activist
- Elizabeth Prentiss (1818–1878), American songwriter, poet and author
- Elisabeth Severance Prentiss (1865–1944), American philanthropist and art collector
- George Prentiss (1876–1902), American baseball pitcher
- Henry Prentiss (1801–1859), American businessman
- John Holmes Prentiss (1784–1861), American newspaper publisher and politician from New York State
- Mara Prentiss (born 1959), American physicist
- Melodye Prentiss, 1968 Playboy model
- Paula Prentiss (born 1938), American actress, wife of Richard Benjamin
- Robert Prentiss (1936–2022), American politician
- Samuel Prentiss (1782–1857), American politician and judge from Vermont
- Seargent Smith Prentiss (1808–1850), American attorney and politician from Mississippi
- Suzanne Prentiss (born 1964), American politician from New Hampshire
- Theodore Prentiss (1818–1906), American lawyer and politician from Wisconsin
- Thomas Prentiss (1809–1895), American-Canadian merchant and politician
- Virginia Prentiss (c. 1832 – 1922), American nanny and community leader
- Willard Prentiss (1897–1959), American racing driver
- William A. Prentiss (1799–1892), American merchant and politician from Wisconsin

== See also ==
- Prentis
- Prentice (surname)
