= Prentice (disambiguation) =

Prentice is both a given name and a surname.

Prentice may also refer to:

- Prentice, Wisconsin, United States
- Prentice (town), Wisconsin, United States
- Prentice Plateau

== See also ==
- Prentice Hall, an American book publishing company
- Prentice position
- Percival Prentice, British military trainer aircraft
- Justice Prentice (disambiguation)
