= Watertown Female Academy =

Watertown Female Academy of Watertown, New York, est. 1826

Watertown Female Academy was an educational institution established for young women in Watertown, New York, in 1826. Like many of its contemporaries, its founding was heavily influenced by the post-Revolutionary ideology of Republican Motherhood. This movement saw success and cultural advancement dependent on educated women serving as enlightened citizens. Before this ideological shift, formal education was a male necessity and not extended to women, who were expected to maintain the household and rear the children.

The inspiration for the Watertown Female Academy was the Troy Female Seminary in Troy, N.Y. This later became known as the Emma Willard School in 1895, named after its founder, Emma Willard, which began in 1814 in Middlebury, N.Y., before moving to Waterford, New York, and subsequently Troy.

== Troy Female Seminary ==
Orville Hungerford, one of the Watertown Female Academy founders and promoters, was not only a business partner of Jabez Foster, but also a brother-in-law via Foster's marriage to Hannah Hungerford. Together, they were part of a foundational civic leadership in early Watertown, N.Y.

In 1824, Foster sent his daughters Elvira L, and Evelina to study at the Troy Seminary. Both married into prominent families two years later; Elvira to Captain Henry Smith, and Evelina to Aldrich Ely, son of Adriel Ely, another longtime associate of both Hungerford and Foster. Rather than sending his daughters 175 miles away to school, Orville Hungerford decided to create his own local school for young women.

== Background ==
By the mid-1820s, the village of Watertown, New York, had become a burgeoning community centered around the Black River. The river's power brought wealth and mercantilism through the proliferation of mills.

This sparked opportunities and the eventual communal responsibility for education in 1802. That year, the first schoolhouse, a log barn, was built at the rear of Dr. Isaiah Massey's inn on lower Washington Street. There, Miss Sally Coffeen was a teacher.

About two years later, a log schoolhouse was built about where the Paddock lot now is, and Miss Heiress Coffeen, Sally's sister, taught there. Around the same time, the first school north of the river appeared on Bradley Street. It was in 1810 that the discussion of a proper academy in Watertown was had. It was Judge Perley Keyes who donated a site on Academy Street, at the rear of the Presbyterian Church, for this purpose.

A group of citizens subscribed $2,500 for the academy's construction, which was 32 x 40 feet, but there was some delay due to the War of 1812. ["Watertown Daily Times," August 24, 1944, pg. 16] The structure, a small brick building, was first used as a barracks for soldiers during the War of 1812. This lasted through its end in December, 1814.

After the war's end, Rev. Daniel Banks opened a school in the building, operating it for a few years. Afterward, the upper part of the structure became home to a Lancastrian School for a short time with indifferent success. The property was sold for debt in 1820 and purchased by the Watertown Ecclesiastical Society. The society itself was part of the First Presbyterian Church.

== Founding ==
In the mid 1820s, Orville Hungerford and Dr. John Safford began their efforts to open the Watertown Female Academy. This was also known later as the Watertown Female Seminary, to be located on a parcel of property owned by Hungerford adjacent to Adriel Ely's residence.

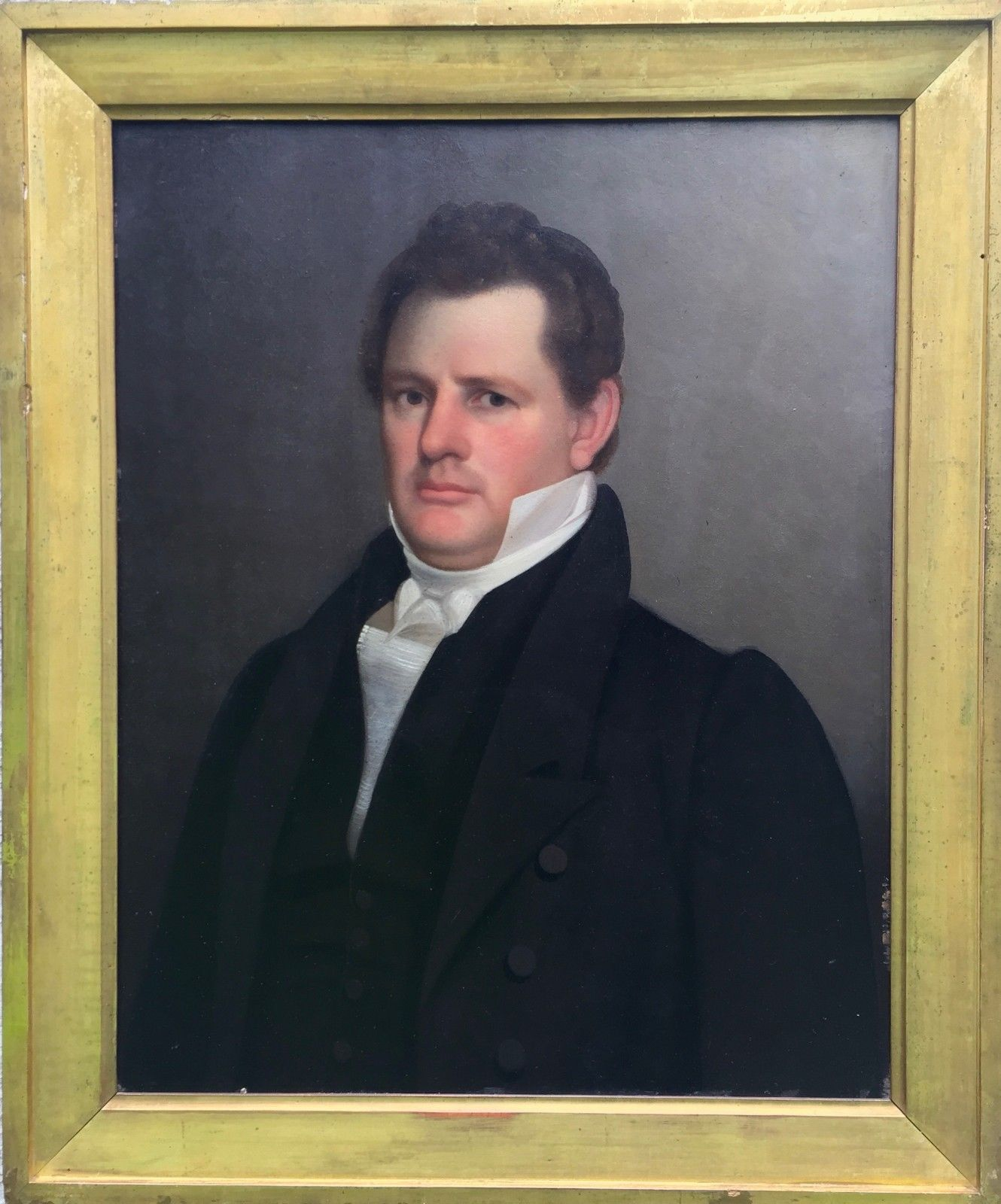
Orville Hungerford's portrait painted by Abraham Tuthill, circa 1830.

The road to it was nothing more than a nameless dirt track that became Clinton Street. Even so, the site was about a block away from Orville Hungerford's mansion. Completed in late November 1825, its original location, having since relocated to W. Flower Ave, was on the corner of Washington and Mullin Streets.

The following year, Dr. John Safford moved to Watertown from Lewis County, where he had resided in Martinsburg for many years. In Watertown, Safford opened the village's first cash store in his Safford Block on Court Street.

Together, the two merchants, who later helped establish The Jefferson County Mutual Insurance Company in March 1836 arranged to re-utilize materials for the academy from the rear of the Presbyterian Church. With the support of their wives, Betsey Porter Stanley Hungerford and Safford's second wife, Clarissa Frances Hurlburt, plans moved forward to construct Watertown's first Female Academy.

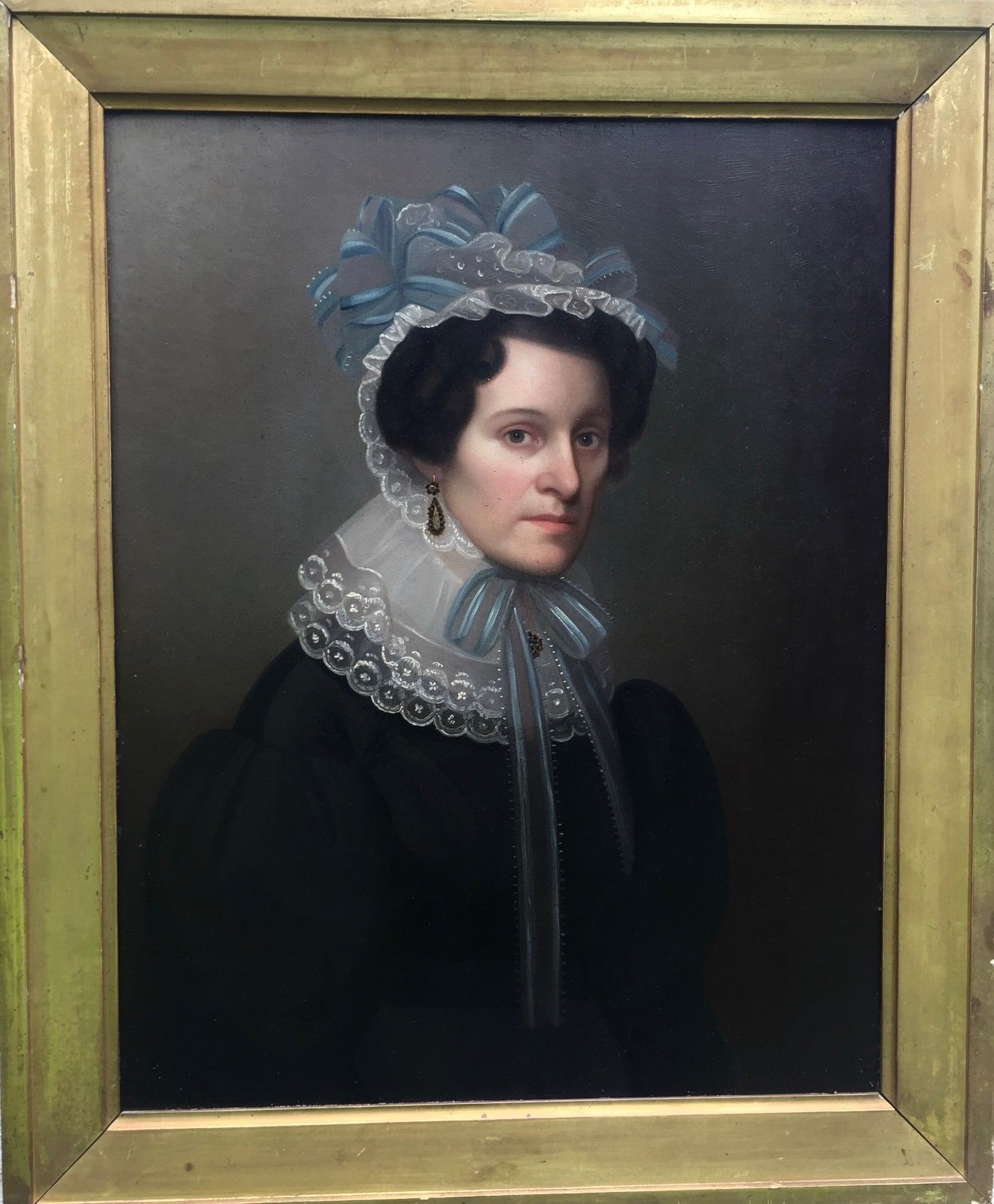
Portrait of "Betsey" Elizabeth Porter Stanley Hungerford (1785-1861), who is the wife of Orville Hungerford (1790-1851), painted by Abraham Tuthill, c.1830

== Curriculum and student life ==
Upon completion, the Watertown Female Academy charged from $1.50 to $2 a week for board. This included laundry, but each young lady also furnished a bed, bedding, napkins, a silver spoon, and a tumbler.

Tuition in the juvenile class was $3 a term, in the preparatory class, $5 a term, in the junior class, $6, and in the senior class, $10. For an extra fee, drawing, music, and French could be added. Board and tuition combined were $100 a year.

Also taught at that time were botany and moral philosophy, logic, algebra, geometry, drawing, music, French, and embroidery.

The first principals for this elite school were Miss Maria Northrup and Sarah Hooker, successively. [Emerson, Edgar C., (editor) "Our County and its People."] Hooker was the sister of General Joseph "Fighting Joe" Hooker. Fighting Joe became the hero of the Battle of Lookout Mountain years later during the Civil War.

Attendees of the school were a who's who from the best families of early Watertown. They included daughters of both the Hungerford and Safford families, amongst others:

Susan M. Safford Mary Safford Charlotte E. Hotchkin Jane L. Massey Lois P. Woodruff Lucy Massey Martha P. Hungerford Lucura H. Hoyt Anna Eliza Huntington Jane A. Butterfield Elizabeth Butterfield Sarah M. Burchard Harriet F. Ely Amelia A. Goodale Mary P. Kimball Maria D. Woodruff.

Through its years, the Watertown Female Academy drew students both near and far. Aside from counties in New York, boarders came from Lyme, Connecticut, and New Paris, Ohio.

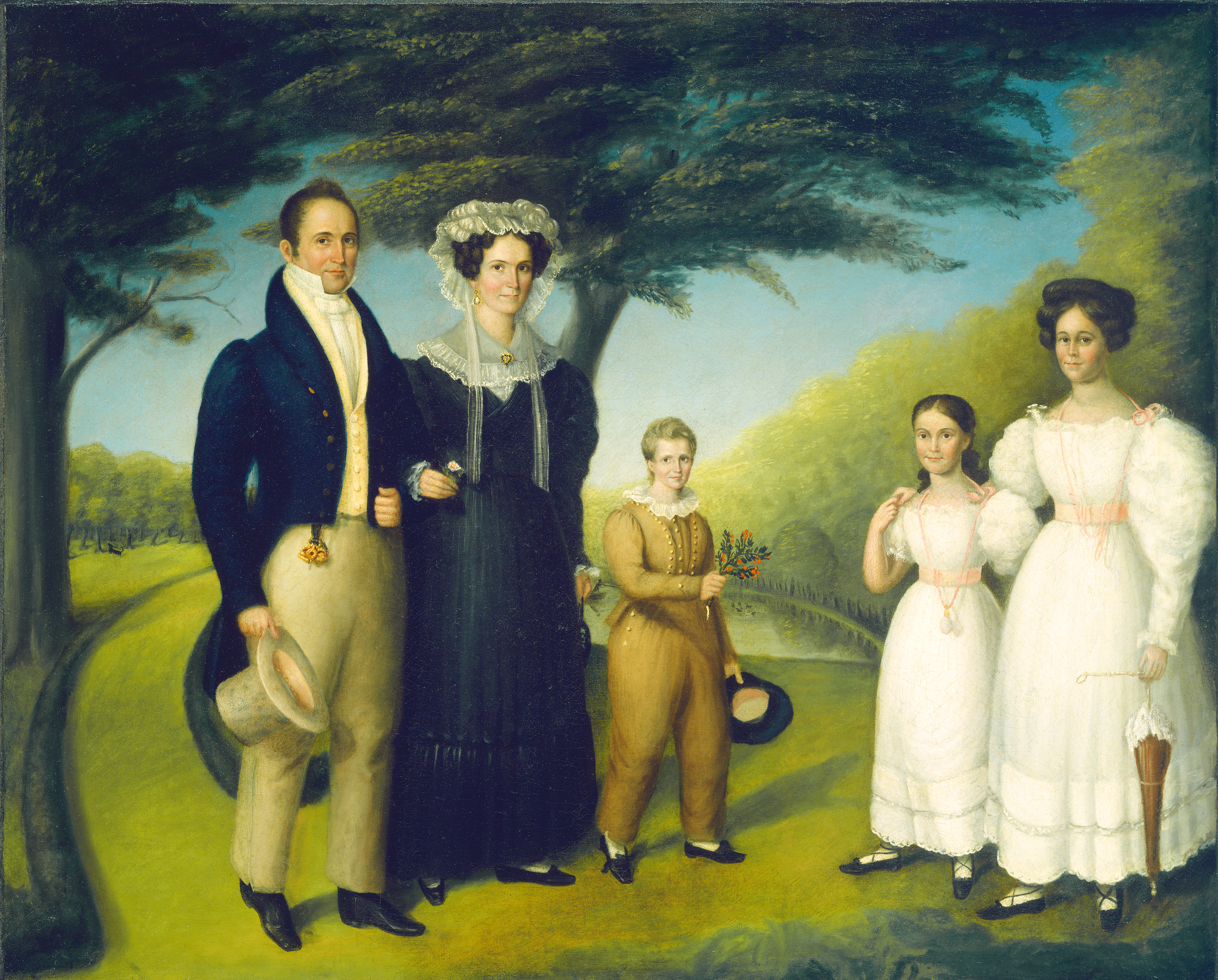
Dr. John Safford and Family, c.1830, attributed to Reuben Rowley. Public Domain.

== Eloise Miles Abbott ==
Eloise Miles Abbott began attending the Watertown Female Academy in 1835 at the age of fourteen. There, she was required to write a 1-page essay and read it in front of the entire school and any visitors. The essay, A Description of Burville," was included in the book, "Personal Sketches and Recollections: In a Series of Letters to a Friend, and Miscellaneous Essays," by Eloise Miles Abbott.

Every week, Eloise needed to write a 1-page essay, which she had to read before the entire school and any visitors. Her first attempt was titled "A Description of Burville," which she read halfway before leaving the room in tears.

Her third sister out of 11 siblings, Emily—an assistant teacher—finished reading the composition, which was deemed the best writing of the day. Eloise decried that the Principal of the Academy, Ann S. Hooker, whom she claimed

failed to enlighten us on many subjects which we might have comprehended, had the information been communicated in an easy and familiar manner. The faculty to impart to others what one knows of books is the great secret of success with teachers, more than their extensive knowledge; but a lack in that direction, and the ability to instruct, too, ought to be sufficient reasons to keep a person from occupying that responsible station.

— Eloise Miles Abbott, Personal Sketches and Recollections: In a Series of Letters to a Friend, and Miscellaneous Essays (Abel Tompkins, 1861), p. 85.

Out of 12 children in the Miles family, 10 ended up becoming teachers.

== Legacy ==
The era of the first female academy and its success in Northern New York ushered in several other girl schools opening in the ensuing years. It was said in the Watertown Daily Times' March 20, 1890 edition, that the Academy "had a high reputation and did much toward encouraging similar enterprises throughout the county.

These included a school at the rear of the old Universalist Church around 1830. A kindergarten school located on Franklin Street opened in 1836. A school in Dr. Isaiah Massey's Eagle Tavern, which operated in 1831, and a female seminary at the corner of State and Mechanic Streets.

Not everyone was pleased with the positive effects of the Female Academies. As told in his series in the Watertown Daily Times, "The Story of Early Watertown," Harry F. Landon remarked, "Indeed, a sour, old villager, in a letter to one of the local papers about this time complained that the girls knew more 'book learning' than their elders but seemed to have lost their knack for spinning and weaving."

The success of the Watertown Female Academy ultimately led to prominent citizens, once again including Orville Hungerford and John Safford, to incorporate on May 2, 1835, the Watertown Academy for men.

"It has too long been a subject of reproach to our community, that, while other interests were flourishing, the interests of education were neglected. Among us there has been no seminary for the education of boys, above the ordinary district school, and the consequences has been, that parents have sent their children abroad, at a very heavy expense, or brought them up in comparative ignorance at home. But this reproach, so far, at least, as regards a provision for the means of acquiring knowledge, is about to be done away."

The school was the first of the Academy Street Schools. Though it was successful from 1832 until 1838, as stated in the March 28, 1890 edition of the Watertown Daily Times, "The school seems to have enjoyed a fair degree of prosperity, although never received under the visitation of the Regents." After the opening of the Black River Literary and Religious Institute, "the usefulness of this school was impaired or at least transferred to the strong institution, and in 1841 the property was formally deeded to its trustees."

== Closure ==
The Watertown Female Academy closed its doors in 1839. Three years prior, the private Black River Literary and Religious Institute opened. Located on State and Mechanic Streets, Presbyterians built it, later changing its name to the Black River Institute. Others followed, including the Adams Seminary for girls (1832); Union Academy in Belleville (1828); Gen. Solon Dexter Hungerford's Hungerford Collegiate Institute in Adams (1855); and the Ives Seminary in Antwerp (1856)."

The Black River Institute became the Jefferson County Institute in 1847. Shortly before Watertown was incorporated as a city, its Board of Education was incorporated in 1865, opening its first public high school in the very same building."

It appears the Hungerford and Safford grown children may have played a role in the Female Academy's closure. That, and the proliferation of the aforementioned local schools and institutions. The name's revival in 1857 under Principal M. A. Randolph was short-lived; it only appeared as advertised for the spring and fall terms.

== Building repurposed ==
As for the former red-brick schoolhouse, it was the residence of Elias Hagar before passing to Pearson Mundy. Mundy, a well-known businessman, died in 1885. The house was then used as the residence for servants and the coachman of Edwin L. Paddock, and later Frank S. Paddock, son of Edwin's brother, Oscar, resided there.

Before it was demolished in 1944, it was headquarters for City Cab Company and City Line Taxi Service, during the 1930-1940s. Today, its former location is part of the Watertown Daily Times employee parking lot.
