= Prentice =

Prentice is both a given name and a surname. Notable people with the name include:

== Given name ==
- Abra Prentice Wilkin (born 1942), American philanthropist
- Nathaniel Prentice Banks (1816–1894), American politician and soldier
- Prentice Cooper (1895–1969), American politician
- Prentice Delaney (1945–2003), American musician, producer, road manager, and songwriter
- Derrick Prentice Barry (born 1983), American drag queen and Britney Spears impersonator
- Prentice E. Sanders (1937-2021), American police chief
- Prentice Gautt (1938–2005), American football running back
- Prentice Marshall (1926–2004), United States District judge on the United States District Court for the Northern District of Illinois
- Prentice McCray (born 1951), former American football safety in the National Football League
- Prentice Moreland (1925–1988), American rhythm and blues singer
- Prentice Mulford (1834–1891), American literary humorist
- Prentice Redman (born 1979), American professional baseball player

== Surname ==
- Prentice (surname)

== Fictional characters ==
- Dr. Peter Prentice, on the show The Mindy Project, portrayed by Adam Pally
- Dr. John Prentice, fictional character on the soap opera General Hospital
- Prentice McHoan, the protagonist of Iain Banks' 1992 novel The Crow Road
- Prentice Endal, an elf from the series Keeper of the Lost Cities by Shannon Messenger
