= Sherman Page =

American politician

Member of the U.S. House of Representatives from New York's 19th district
- In office March 4, 1833 – March 3, 1837
- Preceded by: William Hogan
- Succeeded by: John H. Prentiss

Personal details
- Born: May 9, 1779 Cheshire, Connecticut
- Died: September 27, 1853 (aged 74) Unadilla, New York
- Resting place: St. Matthew's Cemetery, West Seneca, New York

Sherman Page (May 9, 1779 – September 27, 1853) was an American lawyer, jurist, and politician who served two terms as a U.S. representative from New York from 1833 to 1837.

== Biography ==
Born in Cheshire, Connecticut, Page attended the common schools. He taught school in Coventry, New York, in 1799. He studied law. He was admitted to the bar in 1805 and commenced practice in Unadilla, New York.

He served as member of the State assembly in 1827. He served as judge of the court of common pleas in Otsego County.

=== Congress ===
Page was elected as a Jacksonian to the Twenty-third and Twenty-fourth Congresses (March 4, 1833 – March 3, 1837).

He served as chairman of the Committee on Public Expenditures (Twenty-fourth Congress).

=== Death ===
He died in Unadilla, New York, September 27, 1853. He was interred in St. Matthew's Cemetery.

== Sources ==
- United States Congress. "Sherman Page (id: P000023)". Biographical Directory of the United States Congress.

U.S. House of Representatives
Preceded by William Hogan	Member of the U.S. House of Representatives from New York's 19th congressional district March 4, 1833 – March 3, 1837	Succeeded by John H. Prentiss
