= Samuel S. Bowne =

American politician

Samuel Smith Bowne

Member of the U.S. House of Representatives from New York's 19th district
- In office March 4, 1841 – March 3, 1843
- Preceded by: John H. Prentiss
- Succeeded by: Orville Hungerford

Member of the New York State Assembly
- In office 1834

Personal details
- Born: April 11, 1800 New Rochelle, New York, United States
- Died: July 9, 1865 (aged 65) Morris, New York
- Party: Democratic Party
- Spouse: Cordelia Shove Bowne
- Children: Samuel Bowne; Richard Bowne; Cordelia Bowne; Charles A. Bowne
- Profession: farmer; politician; judge

Samuel Smith Bowne (April 11, 1800 – July 9, 1865) was an American lawyer and politician who served one term as a U.S. representative from New York from 1841 to 1843.

== Biography ==
Born in New Rochelle, New York; Bowne moved to Otsego County with his parents, who settled near Morris, New York, and attended the common schools. He engaged in agricultural pursuits and married Cordelia Shove, daughter of Benjamin and Amy Tabor Shove, on November 26, 1820. The couple had four children, Samuel, Richard, Cordelia, and Charles.

== Career ==
Bowne moved to Laurens, Otsego County, New York in 1825, and studied law. He was admitted to the bar in 1832 and commenced practice in Laurens. He moved to Cooperstown, New York, and served as member of the State assembly in 1834.

=== Tenure in Congress ===
Elected as a Democrat to the Twenty-seventh Congress, Bowne served as United States Representative for the nineteenth district of New York from March 4, 1841, to March 3, 1843.

=== Career after Congress ===
Not a candidate for renomination in 1842, he moved to Rochester, New York, in 1846 and continued the practice of his profession. He served as judge of Otsego County from 1851 to 1855, then resumed the practice of law.

== Death ==
Bowne died on his farm near Morris, New York, on July 9, 1865 (age 65 years, 89 days). He is interred at Friends Burying Ground, Morris, New York.

U.S. House of Representatives
Preceded by John H. Prentiss	Member of the U.S. House of Representatives from New York's 19th congressional district March 4, 1841 – March 3, 1843	Succeeded by Orville Hungerford
