= Herman L. Page =

American politician (1818–1873)

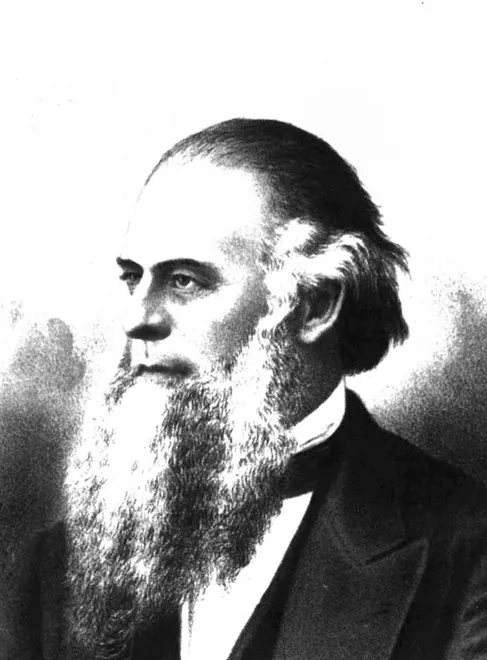
- Page c. 1859

11th Mayor of Milwaukee
- In office 1859–1859
- Preceded by: William A. Prentiss
- Succeeded by: William Pitt Lynde

Personal details
- Born: May 27, 1818 Oneida County, New York, U.S.
- Died: October 15, 1873 (aged 55) Dresden, Germany
- Party: Democratic Party
- Spouse: Cynthia Barber
- Children: 2

Herman L. Page (May 27, 1818 – October 15, 1873) was a merchant and Wisconsin politician. He was born in Oneida County, New York, later moving to Nunda, New York, in Livingston County, New York, in 1844.

Page operated a store in the old Pioneer store, 393 East Water, Milwaukee, Wisconsin.

In 1853 he became sheriff of the county. He was responsible for starting the detective force in the city. During his term as mayor, he advocated the policy of uniforming the police force.

Page began his career as an abolitionist, but, having high political aspirations, he took allegiance to the Democratic Party. He was elected mayor of Milwaukee in 1859. He spent most of his short term of office attacking the former administration of William L. Prentiss.

The Twenty-fourth Infantry Regiment, Civil War was recruited under the direction of Lieutenant Colonel Herman L. Page, however, Page resigned before the regiment left the state.

He was an officer in the Odd Fellows, 1851–1853.

Herman Page died while visiting Dresden, Germany, in 1873.

Preceded by William A. Prentiss	Mayor of Milwaukee; 1859	Succeeded by William Pitt Lynde
