= Orville Hungerford =

American politician

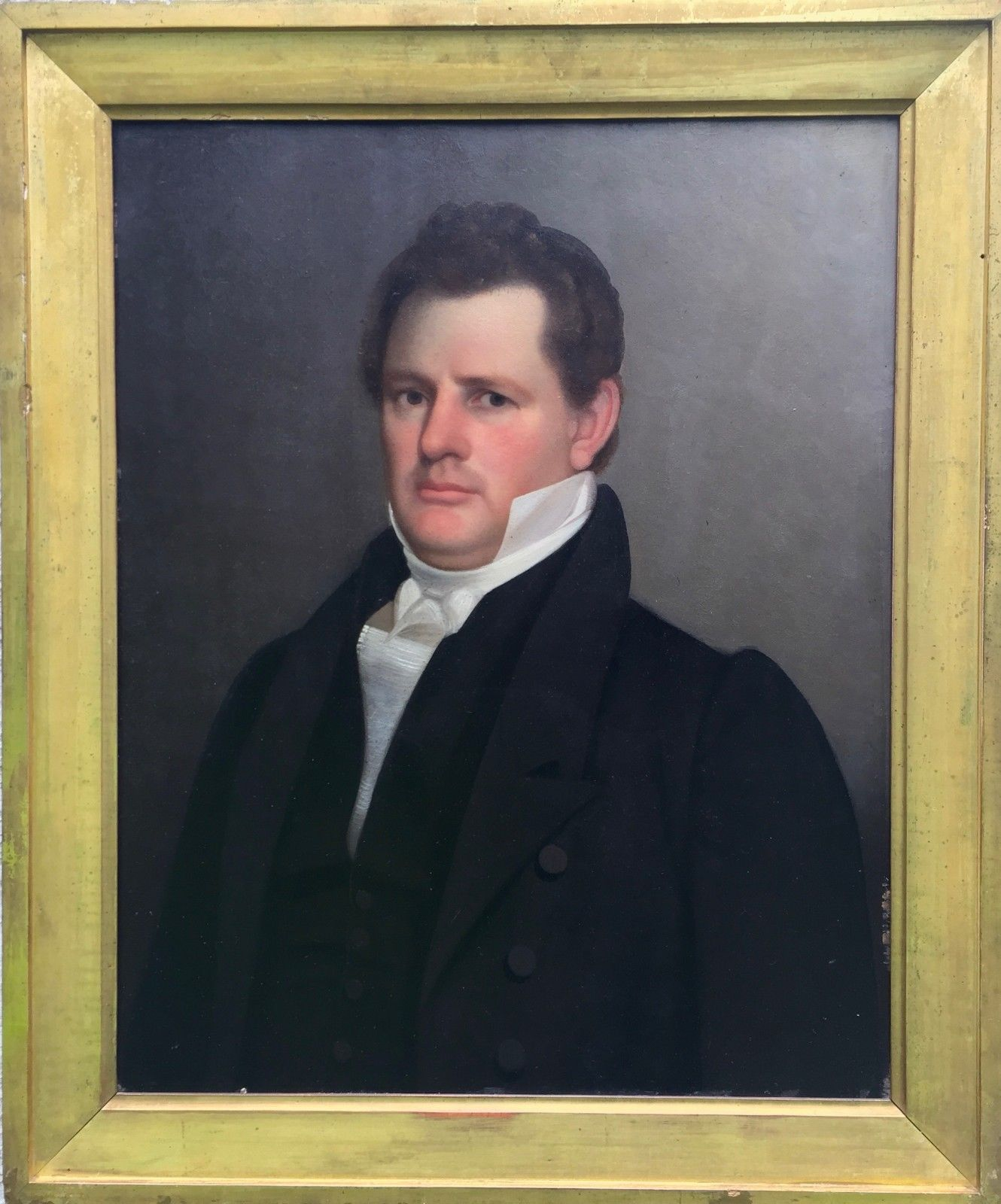

Member of the U.S. House of Representatives from New York's 19th district
- In office March 4, 1843 – March 3, 1847
- Preceded by: Samuel S. Bowne
- Succeeded by: Joseph Mullin

Personal details
- Born: Orville Hungerford; October 29, 1790 Bristol, Connecticut, US
- Died: April 6, 1851 (aged 60) Watertown, New York, US
- Cause of death: Complications from Bilious Cholic
- Resting place: Brookside Cemetery, Watertown, New York
- Party: Democratic Party (United States)
- Spouse: "Betsey" Elizabeth Porter Stanley
- Occupation: merchant, banker, industrialist, militia member, politician, railroad president

Orville Hungerford (October 29, 1790 – April 6, 1851) was a two-term United States representative for the 19th district in New York in the mid-19th century. He was also a prominent merchant, banker, industrialist, freemason, philanthropist, and railroad president in Watertown, New York.

== Early years ==
The youngest of seven children, Orville Hungerford was born in Farmington, Connecticut (now Bristol) on October 29, 1790. His family claims descent from Thomas Hungerford of Hartford, Connecticut, who arrived in the New World some time prior to 1640. Orville's father, Timothy Hungerford, moved his family to Watertown Center in western New York, now part of Watertown (town), New York, in the spring of 1801.

An entry in a 1905 genealogical publication by the local historical society described the education of Orville Hungerford as follows:

His was a life of industry and thrifty habits from the beginning. He had none of the advantages of a liberal education, having only been privileged to attend the common schools of his neighborhood. In these, however, and by private study of such books as he could gain use of, he thoroughly grounded himself in the elementary branches of knowledge, and at the same time became so habituated to reading and observation that even as a young man he was liberally informed, and in mid-life his attainments would put to confusion many collegiates of the present day.

== Merchant ==
As a pioneer, needing help with his farm, Timothy Hungerford was only able to send his son Orville to "winter schools", effectively precluding him from going to college. Not enamored with eking out a living from the land, at age fourteen Orville began working as a clerk in his brother-in-law Jabez Foster's general store in the frontier village of Burrs Mills (also known as Burrville), New York. Orville's initial job duties consisted of "sweeper, duster, office-boy and caretaker." This business was a partnership between Foster and Thomas M. Converse. While Orville watched over the store, Foster would head to Albany in mud wagons and sleighs and then make the arduous week-long trek to Manhattan via sloop to purchase supplies before returning to Watertown. Over time, Hungerford became Foster's "chief and confidential clerk."

In 1807 or 1808, Jabez Foster along with Orville Hungerford moved the store to Watertown, a busier location. Orville's diligence paid off and he became Foster's partner in the firm known as Foster & Hungerford, which profited handsomely from selling supplies to U.S. Army stationed at Sackets Harbor during the War of 1812. This partnership became the largest mercantile business in the area.

Foster & Hungerford developed its own transportation network contracting with others to deliver its war supplies during the 2nd major conflict with the British. For example, in September 1812, Jabez Foster hired Eber Hubbard to move supplies that he and Orville Hungerford had procured on behalf of the U.S. government using Hubbard's boat to journey from "Sackett's Harbor" down the St. Lawrence River to the U.S. troops stationed in Ogdensburg, New York. British forces ended up capturing Hubbard's boat. In late 1820, Hubbard petitioned Congress to cover the loss of his boat valued between $650–800. Hubbard argued that the government agreed to reimburse Foster for any losses, which should also cover him. Unfortunately, on December 22, 1820, the Committee of Claims in the House of Representatives disagreed that any contractual protections for Foster would implicitly extend to Hubbard.

In 1813, Foster became a judge in the Court of Common Pleas for Jefferson County, while Hungerford decided to focus on expanding his commercial interests rather than reading law. Judge Foster and Orville Hungerford dissolved their partnership in 1815. Hungerford set up his own store. Adriel Ely married Judge Foster's daughter and went into partnership with his father-in-law, forming: Ely & Foster. Afterwards, Ely joined Hungerford in his mercantile business for a while until both parties went off on their own. Later, Jabez Foster entered into a mercantile partnership in Watertown, N.Y. with his son Gustavus A. Foster, which was dissolved on August 1, 1824.

Orville had his children work in his family store. His son Richard Esselstyne Hungerford served as a clerk in the store before heading off to Hamilton College in Clinton, New York (Class of 1844). There Richard joined his cousin, John N. Hungerford, who also worked in his older brother's store, Hungerford & Miner, before going to Hamilton College and then becoming a banker and finally a U.S. Congressman.

Hungerford made frequent trips to New York City to sell potash from his ashery in Watertown and purchase wares to bring back to his store. On October 6, 1840, the New York Herald newspaper announced that Orville Hungerford arrived the previous day at the Franklin House hotel, located at the northwest corner of Broadway and Dey Street in New York City.

Orville Hungerford endorsed modern conveniences. For example, he helped fellow merchants promote the "Air-Tight Rotary Cook Stove", which used one third less wood, as advertised in local newspapers such as the Northern State Journal.

On May 13, 1849, a great fire swept through Watertown, N.Y., setting alight 100 buildings valued at $125,000. A large section of the downtown business district was destroyed. The dry goods store of J. & H. Seligman & Co., what became the Wall Street financial colosses J. & W. Seligman & Co., burned down. Only four dry goods stores survived including one owned by Orville Hungerford and another by his former business partner Adriel Ely. Located on the Village Public Square, also known as the Mall, Hungerford's store had an 84-feet long brick facade and was either two or three stories high. A year or so later, however, his store succumbed to flames. On October 16, 1852, another fire scorched "Hungerford's block", which was mostly insured. The approximate site of Hungerford's store was replaced with the Smith & Percey building, more recently known as the Slye & Burrows building. This 4-story building, which was destroyed by gas leak explosion in June 1832 and later rebuilt to only 2 stories, was owned by descendants of Orville Hungerford's son, Richard E. Hungerford, until 1969.

== Family ==
On October 31, 1813, Orville Hungerford married Elizabeth Porter Stanley, known as Betsey or sometimes spelled Betsy, whose family was originally from Wethersfield, Connecticut. Betsey was the daughter of George and Hannah (Porter) Stanley. She was born on March 27, 1785 and baptized on April 3, 1785 in the First Church of Wethersfield, Connecticut. Betsey and Orville's wedding took place in Watertown, N.Y. on October 31, 1813, and was officiated by Calvin McKnight, J.P.

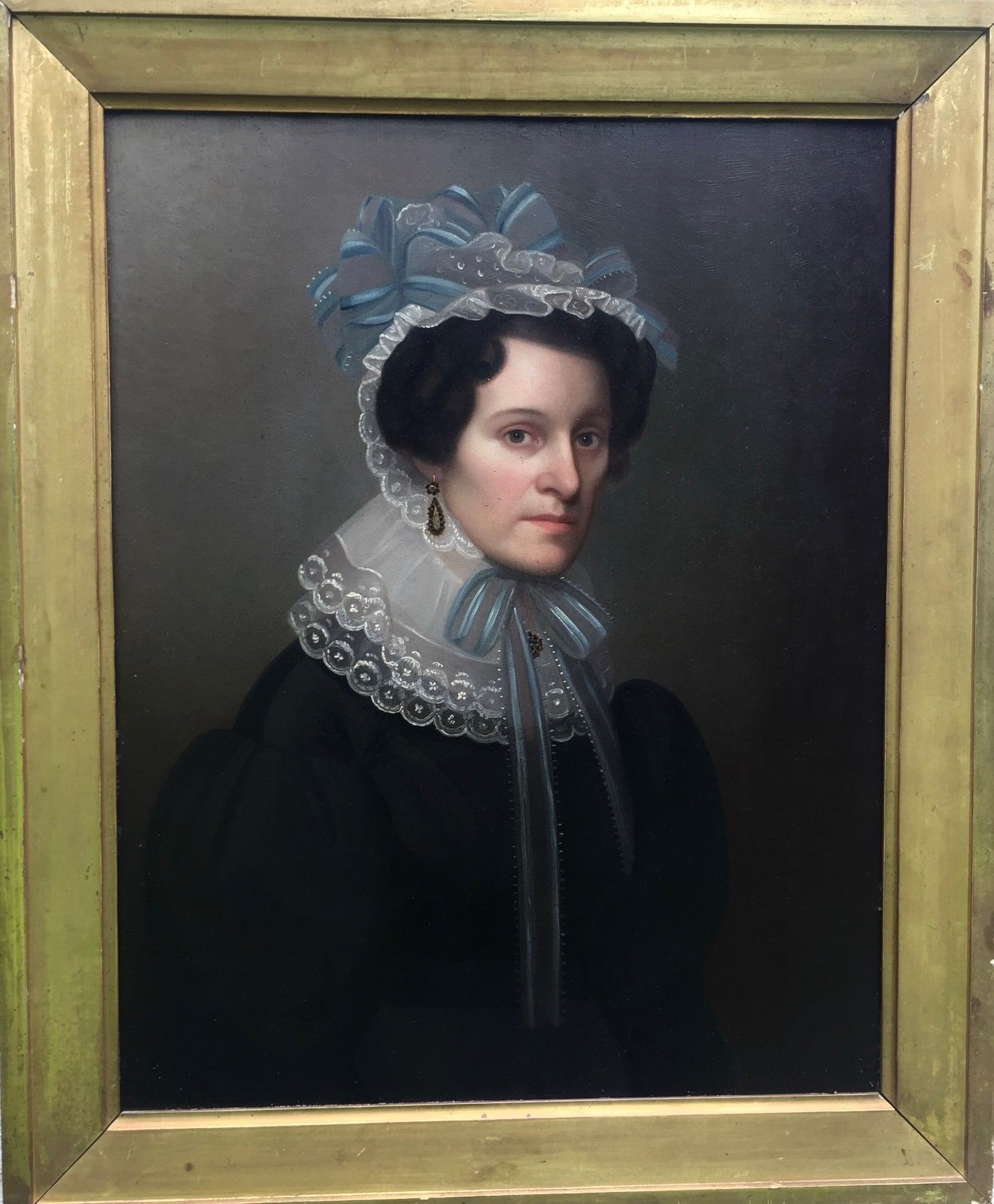
1830 Portrait Betsey Elizabeth Porter Stanley Hungerford

The couple had the following children: Mary Stanley (May 6, 1815 – Mar. 13, 1893), Marcus (Aug. 30, 1817 – Sep. 3, 1863), Martha B. (Nov. 30, 1819 – Sep. 21, 1896), Richard Esselstyne (Mar. 28, 1824 – Jan. 5, 1896), Frances Elizabeth (Feb. 8, 1827 – Nov. 25, 1902), Grace, and Orville F. (Feb. 25, 1830 – Nov. 26, 1902.)

On May 28, 1838, Mary Stanley Hungerford married Zabdial Rogers Ely (Jan. 16, 1809 – Nov. 15, 1839), an 1833 Yale College graduate, who became a Congregational minister, from Deep River, Connecticut.

Betsey raised her nephew Moses Hopkins Stanley, who was born in Great Barrington, Massachusetts (Nov. 1807 – April or May 1856).

Orville Hungerford's success was a direct result of the support given by his wife Betsey: "She was a woman of beautiful character and disposition, and an efficient colaborer with her revered husband in all his benevolent works."

Orville Hungerford's sister Loraine married Daniel Brainard [also spelled Brainerd], a physician and surgeon, circa January 1805. Loraine and Daniel Brainerd then named their first son Orville Velora Brainerd, who was born on January 4, 1807, in Watertown, N.Y. When Orville Velora Brainard's father died a few years after his son's birth, Orville's mother would end up placing her son in the care of her brother Orville Hungerford, who successfully taught his nephew the ins and outs of banking and finance. To honor his uncle, Orville Velora Brainard named his first son Orville Hungerford Brainard, born November 2, 1838, in Watertown, N.Y. and dying in that city on June 2, 1874.

== Banker ==
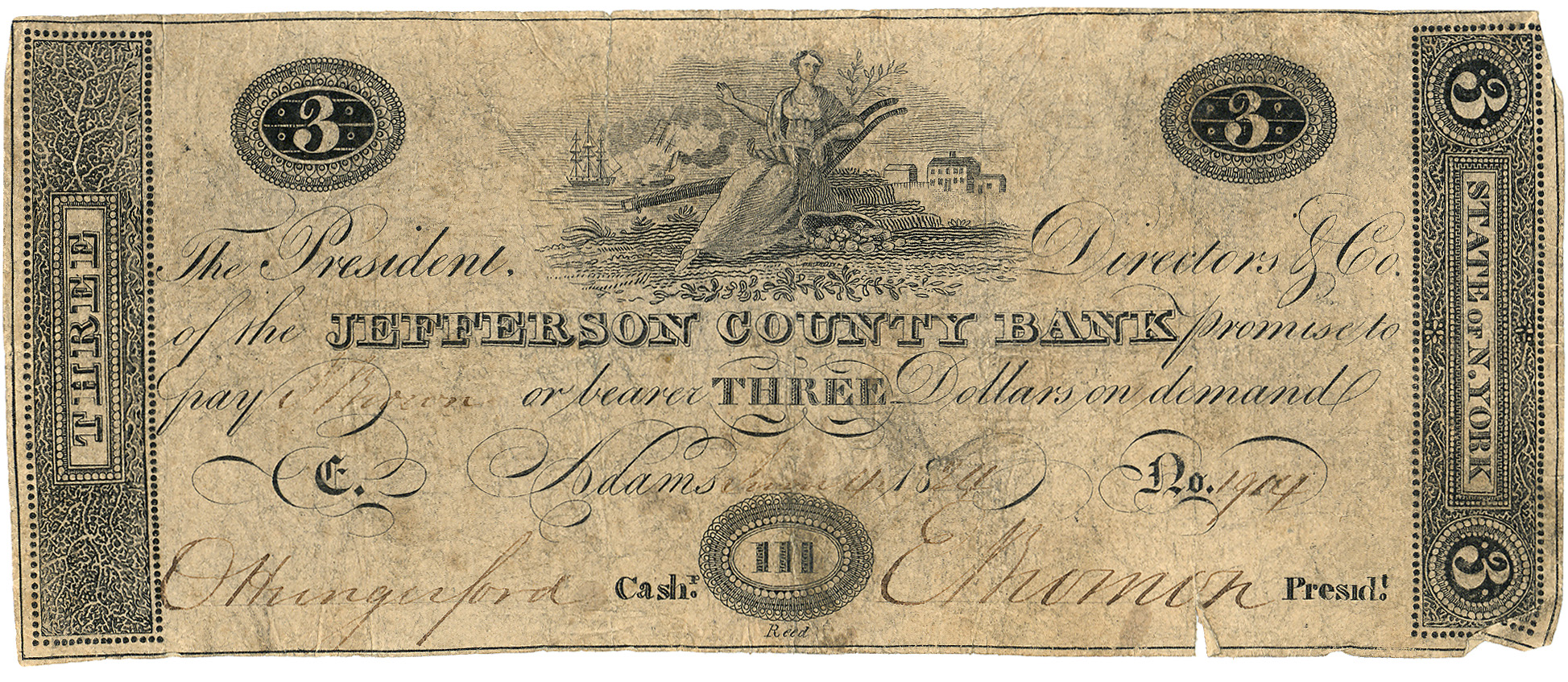
Three-dollar Jefferson County Bank note issued in 1824 and signed by cashier O. Hungerford

Orville Hungerford became a prominent banker due to the influence of his brother-in-law Jabez Foster. Because Jefferson County, New York was expanding in the early nineteenth century due in part to the development of the Erie Canal from 1817 to 1825, farmers and businessmen there needed greater access to capital. In 1816, Jabez Foster, at the time Orville Hungerford's mercantile business partner, along with others, successfully petitioned the legislature to establish the Jefferson County Bank. Foster was chosen to help apportion stock and choose the building location, which was a contentious matter because each community in the area wanted the bank to be located there. As a compromise, the bank ended up being housed in a brick Georgian colonial mansion on Church Street in the village of Adams, New York. The bank was initially capitalized with $50,000.00, of which half the amount was paid in. However, the bank did not fare financially well in Adams. Pursuant to an act passed on November 19, 1824, the bank relocated to Watertown and the capital fund was increased to $80,000.00.

Jabez Foster served as the second president of the Jefferson County Bank (1817–1819) and later resumed the office for a short period (1825–1826) after Bank President Ethel Bronson died. Orville Hungerford served as bank cashier (1820–1833) and later as bank president (1834–1845). In turn, Orville hired his nephew Orville V. Brainard first as a bank teller and then as his replacement as cashier, a position Brainard held for 33 years. By 1857, The New-York Reformer newspaper claimed in an article that Brainard ranked as one of the richest men in Watertown with an estimated worth of more than $100,000.

As cashier of the Jefferson County Bank, Orville Hungerford and bank president Jabez Foster presented to the New York State Assembly the following fiscal report dated March 3, 1821: $98,833.03 owed to the bank, $57,870 of capital stock paid in, $4,096.84 owed by the bank, and $34,185.35 of bank notes in circulation.

Dr. Isaac Bronson, an early investor in the Jefferson County Bank, served as a surgeon on George Washington's staff during the Revolutionary War before turning to a career in finance that made him a fortune estimated at his death in 1838 to be $1,500,000 of monied securities. One of his chief investments was the Bridgeport Bank in Connecticut, where he served on the board of directors from 1806 to 1832. Because of competition in Manhattan driving down interest rates there, Dr. Bronson began loaning money in more rural places such as Jefferson County, New York, where he could get a higher rate of return.

Dr. Bronson engaged his brother Ethel Bronson to sell his investment lands in Jefferson County. Ethel Bronson served as president of the Jefferson County Bank from 1820 through his death in 1825, appointing Orville Hungerford as cashier of the bank beginning in 1820. As a physician turned banker, Dr. Isaac Bronson instructed Hungerford in his capacity as cashier to adhere to stringent banking standards such as "make the bills of the bank always at par in New York [City] by redeeming [there]; another, never to renew a note for a customer, until the original was paid up; and a third, to refuse to discount paper having over ninety days to run." By adhering to this sound money lending regime, at least for a while, Hungerford was able to maintain the bank's high profits, which made it one of the best bank investments in the state. Isaac Bronson ended up making a large profit on his sale of stock in the Jefferson County Bank. In 1824, the Wall Street investment bank Prime, Ward & King, which was headed by Nathaniel Prime, purchased from Bronson half the capital in the Jefferson County Bank.

As a financial institution, the Jefferson County Bank accepted promissory notes, a common form of debt that could be passed on to another person or entity for collection. On May 14, 1825, a man by the name of Heath made a promissory note for $150 with interest, which James Wood from Brownville, New York indorsed. In June 1826, the Bank took the matter to court and ended up getting a judgment against Wood in his capacity as a surety. On appeal, Wood argued that Jefferson County Bank was not a proper corporate body and that its cashier Orville Hungerford reached an agreement with Heath to collect security from him if Wood failed to pay. Hungerford made this deal on his own and then went to the bank's board of directors for approval, but they failed to formally adopt a resolution on the matter. The appeal court found that the bank was properly established and that Hungerford's deal was not a defense to being on the hook for guaranteeing payment, i.e., Wood had to pay up. Hungerford continued on as cashier for the bank.

In 1828, fellow dry goods merchant, Loveland Paddock purchased a large number of shares in the Jefferson County Bank and joined the board of directors. Loveland Paddock also helped found the Bank of Watertown. By 1857, The Reformer newspaper claimed that Paddock ranked as the richest man in Watertown with an estimated worth of $800,000.

Orville Hungerford was protective of the bank's financial reputation. He sent a letter to the "Albany Argus", a newspaper based in Albany, New York, dated March 12, 1830, stating the following:

Sir–A report has been put in circulation, that this bank has stopped payment. How it has originated, I cannot imagine, as there is not a shadow of any thing to make it out of. Mr. Stebbins [N.Y. bank commissioner] was here a few days since [Jefferson County Bank in Watertown, N.Y.], and after an examination, appeared to be entirely satisfied that we were not only safe, but doing very will [sic.].-I desire that you will not only contradict the report; but caution editors against publishing unfounded reports of this kind, as they can prove only injurious to the public and to the bank. Yours, &c. O. HUNGERFORD, Cashier.

In February 1837, an aggrieved director of the Jefferson County Bank filed a complaint with the New York Assembly that other bank directors showed favoritism by "knowingly, indirectly, [giving] more than 250 shares to one person in violation of the law increasing said capital of bank." In their defense, the accused bank directors claimed that the legislative committee running the investigation had familial connections to those making accusations and that the committee was holding secret sessions in which biased witnesses were examined. As bank president, Orville Hungerford stayed behind the scenes while others were the public face of the counterattack. It was a wise decision because Orville was subpoenaed to testify about the stock distribution. According to one contemporary source, this complaint to the Assembly was really a power play to oust him from his position. In the end, Hungerford subtly beat back his opponents by having his allies present letters as part of the record that focused on the unfairness of the proceedings. Hungerford continued on as bank president.

During the Panic of 1837, the Jefferson County Bank, along with every other bank in the state of New York, suspended the payment of its bank notes into precious metal coinage.

The Watertown Directory for 1840 lists only two banks, both located along Washington Street: The Jefferson County Bank capitalized at $200,000 and the Bank of Watertown capitalized at $100,000. The Watertown Directory for 1840 also showed Orville Hungerford as president of the Jefferson County Bank along with his nephew Orville Velora Brainard as his cashier and his other nephew Solon Dexter Hungerford as his teller. Interestingly, the individual page for Orville Hungerford in the Watertown Directory for 1840 lists his occupation as "merchant". On October 25, 1845, Solon Dexter Hungerford opened Hungerford's Bank in Adams, New York and later printed a portrait of his uncle, Orville Hungerford, in the left corner of his bank's ten-dollar note.

On December 19, 1845, Orville Hungerford testified as a witness in the federal criminal case United States vs. Caleb J. McNulty, stating the following: "I was president of Jefferson county Bank when elected to Congress, and resigned before I came here."

In late 1847, Orville Hungerford, who resumed his presidency of the Jefferson County Bank after his political career ended, initiated a lawsuit against the powerful Wall Street financial firm Prime, Ward & Co. for squandering the bank's money by speculating in the flour market. The New York trial court had granted Hungerford a judgment of $70,000. The Jefferson County Bank, which was later joined by other creditors, asked the court to issue Stillwell warrants, which caused the sheriff to arrest Edward Prime, Samuel Ward (lobbyist), and John Ward based on the legal theory that they were about to remove their assets in the United States to pay creditors in England. The defendants attempted to quash the warrants based on lack of jurisdiction and insufficient affidavits, but were unsuccessful. The Jefferson County Bank's attorney in the lawsuit, George C. Sherman, who was also a director of the bank, mercilessly questioned one of the defendants, resulting in the recovery of some bank funds.

An 1864 cartographic map of Watertown, N.Y. listed various banks in the Village, showing that the Jefferson County Bank held $148,000 of cash capital, which was far greater than the $100,000 held by its competitors the Black River Bank and the First National Bank or the $91,500 held by the Watertown Bank & Loan Company and the $50,000 held by O. Paddock & Co.'s Bank. The 1864 map listed Orville Hungerford's nephew and understudy, O.V. Brainard, as cashier for the Jefferson County Bank.

Throughout the entire nineteenth century, the Jefferson County Bank, nationally chartered in 1865, never defaulted on its obligations and from 1824 paid its shareholders regular dividends. To put its growth in perspective: in 1821 it had resources of $91,000.00; by January 1, 1916, it had resources of $3,000,000.00. In 1916, Orville's grandson, Orville E. Hungerford, was vice-president of the Jefferson County National Bank.

Orville Hungerford also co-founded the Bank of Watertown, which was capitalized at $100,000, and began operations on January 26, 1839. At this time, there were only two banks in Watertown, New York, whose primary industry consisted of four textile mills, employing around 160 workers, and similar businesses such as five flouring mills and Starr's distillery churning our 60,000 gallons of whiskey annually.

== Investor ==
Orville Hungerford played an important role in the industrialization of the Watertown, New York, by investing his capital to help others start local ventures. For example, Hungerford helped establish the Sterling Iron Company, Black River Woolen Company, and the Jefferson County Mutual Insurance Company.

In 1824, Orville Hungerford purchased the Oakland House, a hotel in Watertown, New York, which he then sold to Lewis Rich in 1847. Orville's brother, Dexter, purchased a hotel in Watertown, named the White House, in 1827. Afterwards Dexter Hungerford sold his hotel to the Hotel Company, owned by Orville Hungerford, N.M. Woodruff, and Robert Lansing, who rebuilt the structure in 1836. Unfortunately, this hotel burned down in the Great Fire of May 13, 1849.

At some point Orville Hungerford and Jabez Foster owned a "Flouring or Grist mill" located on the north side of the Black River (New York) as indicated on an 1836 map of the Village of Watertown in Jefferson County, N.Y. drafted by John Deneson.

On Monday, January 9, 1839, the New York Assembly read a petition from Orville Hungerford and ninety others, seeking to extend the Black River Canal, a feeder for the Erie Canal, all the way up to Lake Ontario or the St. Lawrence River.

Beginning in the 1840s, building a plank road became a popular way to facilitate transportation routes, and several were planned to be built in Watertown and its environs. Orville Hungerford and his nephew Orville Velora Brainard were instrumental in funding and incorporating the Watertown and Sackets Harbor Plank Road Company.

== Homestead ==
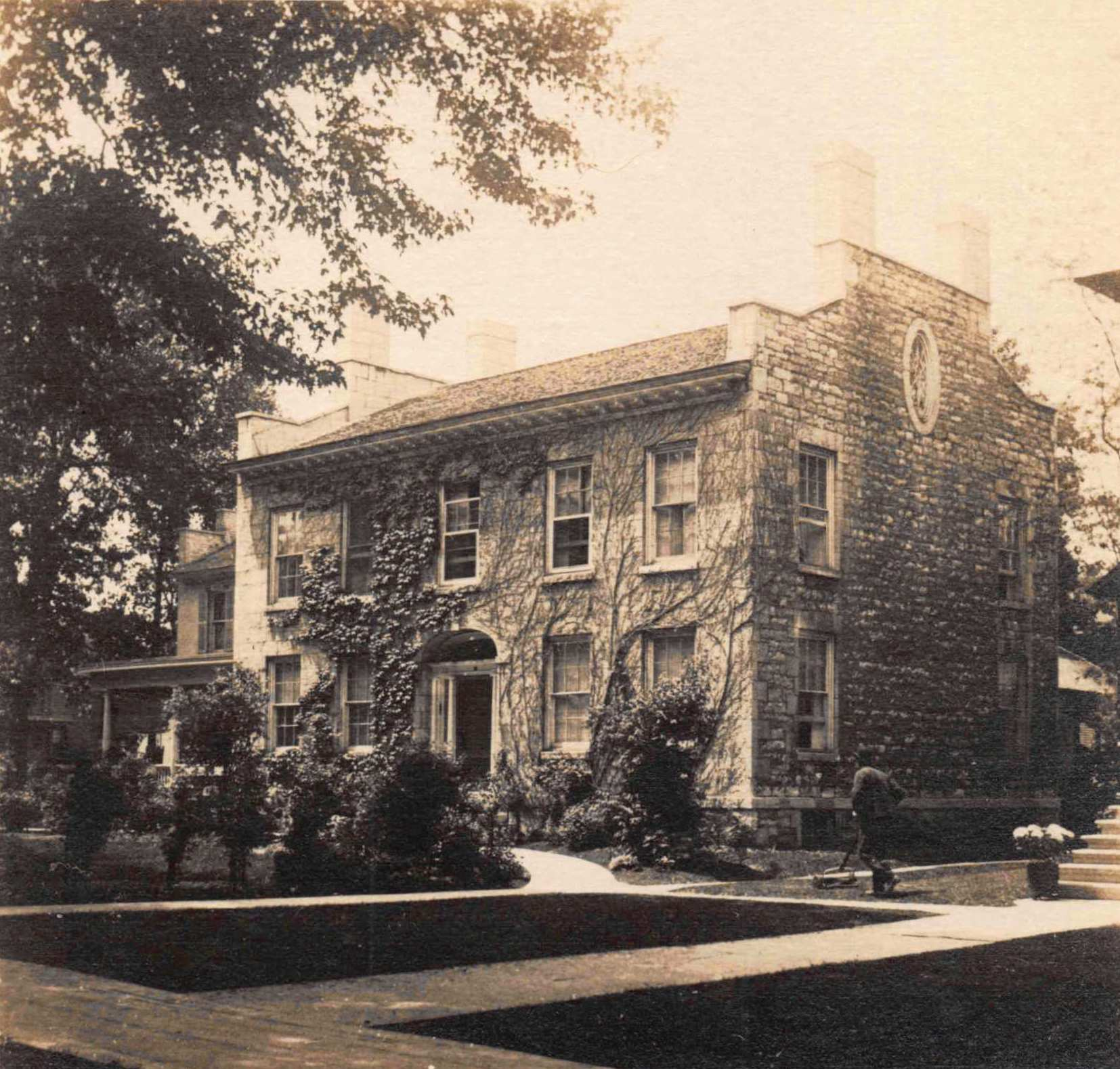
Orville Hungerford's home on 336 Washington Street

Orville Hungerford's first home was framed out of wood with a piazza in front and on the side on Washington Street, near what is now Clinton Street in Watertown, New York. The original owner, Pedi Wells, built this dwelling next to the house of Orville's sister Hannah Hungerford Foster and her husband Jabez Foster.

In 1823, Orville Hungerford began to construct the largest house in Watertown on a piece of property that he purchased in 1816 for $500.00 from Olney and Eliza Pearce. In front was a "glorious" English garden laid out to Orville's specifications. The outer walls of the home were made out of native limestone. The inside had 14 bedrooms and 10 fireplaces to keep the occupants warm. An ox team hauled the "black Italian marble mantel" from Albany. Construction on the main house continued through 1824. On November 11, 1825, Orville opened the six-paneled door with a brass eagle-knocker at 336 Washington Street and moved into his mansion.

A July 9, 1942 newspaper article in the Watertown Daily Times described the "semi-circular garden" in the front yard of the Hungerford home on Washington Street, which was originally planted by Betsey Hungerford 118 years earlier: "Many of the same plants and shrubs are still there-the big barberry bush at the corner, the bleedinghearts by the doorway, the white roses scattered all through and the snowdrops that clothe the whole garden with their nodding bells almost before the snow has melted. There were always tulips, small ones in red and orange, and forget-me-nots."

The John Losee House, built c. 1828, located at the 2020 address of 17100 County Route 155 in Watertown, New York, is very similar in design and construction to Orville Hungerford's dwelling. The National Park Service entered the John Losee House in the National Register on February 1, 2014. In support of its requested designation, the National Register of Historic Places Registration Form filed in December 2013 stated the following:

Similar to the nominated Losee house, Hungerford's residence was a five-bay, center-hall form, embellished with Federal detailing, including a main entrance almost identical to the Losee house—a six-paneled wooden door recessed into an elaborate moulded wood surround, emphasized with recessed panels, sidelights, a full moulded entablature supported by engaged columns, and surmounted by an arched limestone architrave with a projecting keystone. The only differences between the Losee and Hungerford entrances is the patterns of the tracery and the use of Doric order capitals on the former and Ionic order on the latter.

Similarly, in 2016, the National Park Service entered the Norton-Burnham House in Henderson N.Y. into the National Register of Historic Places by relying on the cited architectural reference points of both the Orville Hungerford Homestead and the John Losee House.

The English ivy-covered Hungerford residence eventually passed to Orville's daughter, Frances E., a spinster, whose estate conveyed it to her niece Helen Hungerford (Mrs. Leland G. Woolworth). After Helen died, ownership of the house transferred to her sister Harriet Hungerford, another spinster. Harriet had been living next door in her father Marcus Hungerford's house at 330 Washington Street. She moved into the Orville Hungerford mansion in 1946 and lived there until her death on October 26, 1956. By this time most of the family had moved out of the Watertown area and no one wanted to return. The Watertown National Bank bought the property from Harriet's estate and sold it to Joseph Capone, a developer. In turn, John R. Burns, purchased the structure and reassembled the house minus the left-wing several blocks away on Flower Avenue West in Watertown, where it still stands.

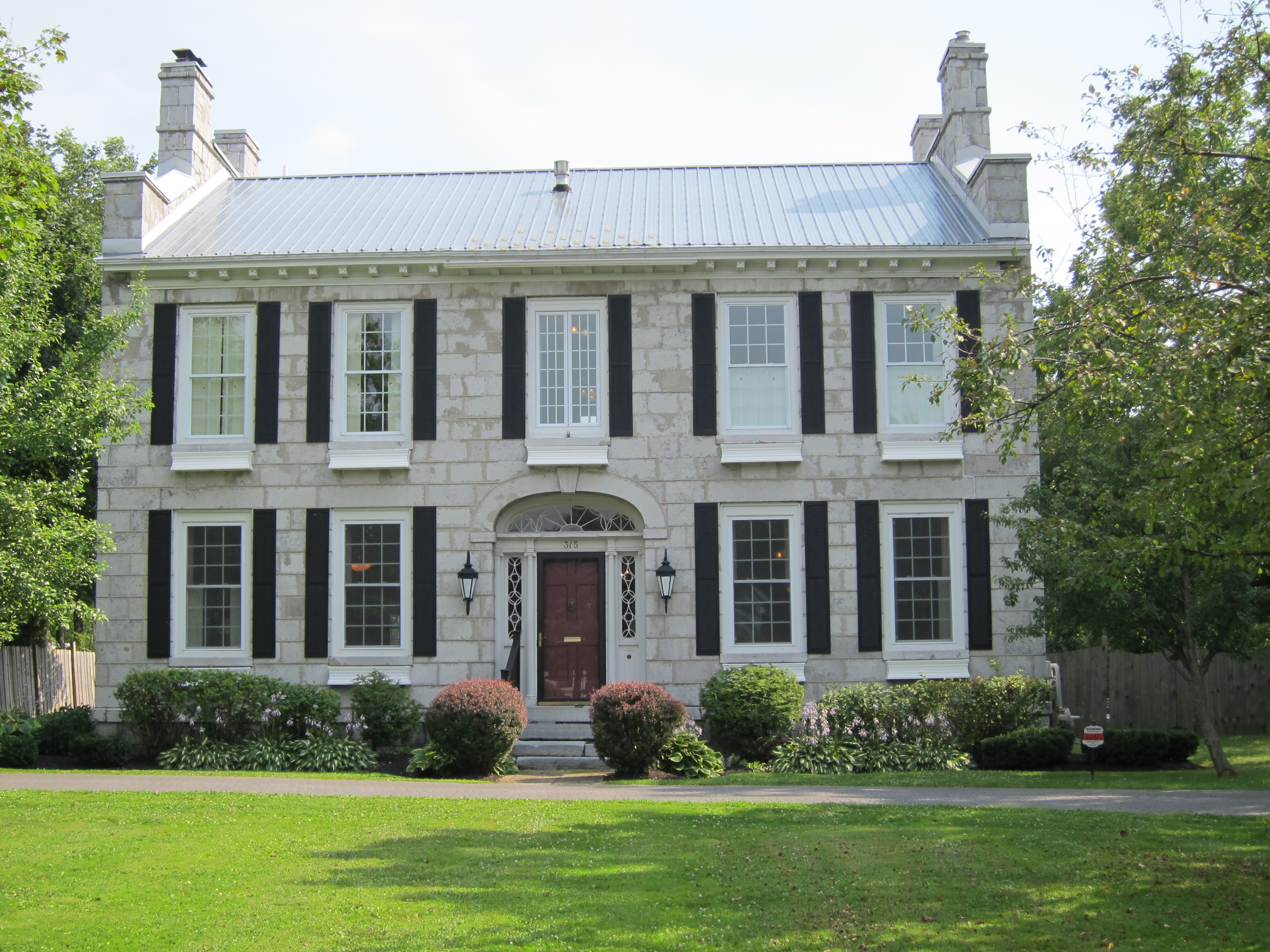
Orville Hungerford homestead in its present location in Watertown, New York

After the Hungerford stone mansion was moved and rebuilt, the original site on Washington Avenue in Watertown became a hotel known at the Carriage House Inn, later operated under the Best Western brand.

== Military service ==
During the War of 1812, Orville Hungerford and his brother-in-law Jabez Foster supplied the U.S. Army in Sackets Harbor, N.Y. as well as surrounding military posts. In 1817, Orville was appointed as a second lieutenant in the Fourteenth regiment of cavalry in the militia of Jefferson County. In 1821, Orville succeeded Captain Jason Fairbanks and was also on the staff of Major General Clark Allen. In 1822, Orville was appointed the Quartermaster of the Twelfth Division of infantry for Jefferson County.

== Freemason ==
As early as 1818, Orville Hungerford was a member of the Freemasons at Watertown Lodge No. 289 in Watertown, New York. In 1826, Hungerford along with his business partner, Adriel Ely, and others applied for a dispensation to establish a local Encampment of Knights Templar. On February 22, 1826, the Deputy Grand Commander of the Grand Encampment, Oliver W. Lownds, granted the dispensation. Hungerford presided as Grand Commander from March 24, 1826, until April 17, 1829, during which time twenty-nine men had the Order of the Temple conferred upon them.

However, the 1826 disappearance of William Morgan (anti-Mason), who threatened to publicize the secrets of Freemasonry, caused the public to lash out at the secretive organization. In 1829, a Boston Masonic newspaper, citing the Watertown Freeman publication, reported that a mere 69 people marched through the city to protest the abduction of Morgan when hundreds were expected. On December 2, 1835, the Grand Lodge of New York expelled Hungerford's two former business partners, Adriel Ely and Jabez Foster, who were members of the late Watertown Lodge No. 289, because they renounced in the newspapers their participation in freemasonry.

Hungerford began working his way up the New York chapter of the Royal Arch Masons. This chapter was organized March 14, 1798, with future New York governor DeWitt Clinton elected as its first Grand High Priest. In 1826, 1827, and 1828, Hungerford was elected to the office of "The Grand King" in the Royal Arch Masons. On September 14, 1826, Hungerford attended the 6th meeting of the General Grand Royal Arch Chapter of the United States in New York City as a representative of the New York State Grand Chapter.

In 1830, a number of prominent masons such as Orville Hungerford and his political mentor Perley Keyes signed the following public defense of their fraternal organization:

It is alleged among other things that we take upon ourselves obligations and oaths which bind us to assist a Mason, when in difficulty, right or wrong, to vote for a Mason in preference to any other person, and, what is still worse, to keep the secrets of a Mason, murder and treason not excepted. And we say to you we have taken no such obligations as those above mentioned.

Due to continued public condemnation of freemasonry, however, Sir Orville Hungerford's encampment would go dark in 1831. In February 1850, after the furor abated, Hungerford and others successfully petitioned the Grand Encampment of New York to reissue their former warrant, thereby establishing Watertown Commandery No. 11.

On January 16, 1826, Hungerford bought from Hart Masey a three-story brick building on Washington Street in Watertown, which housed the Eastern Light Lodge No. 289. The deed to the building had a covenant to secure the use of a 40 by 42.5-room on the third floor for the Masons. During the height of the Morgan affair uproar, the Lodge operated in secret, communicating to members by placing a lighted candle in certain windows. In 1834–35 the Eastern Light Lodge failed to hold annual elections; the concomitant failure to collect dues resulted in forfeiture of the charter, which was reinstated in 1835 upon a successful petition to the Grand Lodge. The Washington Street building was destroyed in a fire on January 27, 1851, and the Eastern Light Lodge moved temporarily to an Odd Fellows Hall and then to several other locations.

In 1838, Orville Hungerford was elected high priest of Watertown Chapter No. 59 of the Royal Arch Masons, which received its New York charter on February 7, 1817. Hungerford carried on as high priest for three years. During his tenure, he created 14 members.

Orville Hungerford continued his involvement with freemasonry while serving in Congress. Diarist Benjamin B. French stated: "As a Freemason, [Hungerford] was a constant visitor to our Chapters and Lodges in the District, and never declined any duty that he was asked [to] perform." In 1850, Hungerford was elected to the position of Deputy Grand High Priest of the Grand Chapter State of New York, Royal Arch Masons. In 1851, Hungerford became the 15th Grand High Priest of the Grand Chapter State of New York, Royal Arch Masons. Marcus Hungerford, the son of Orville, would join Watertown Lodge, No. 49.

== Community service ==
Fire was always a threat in frontier communities. In 1816, Orville Hungerford's brother-in-law Jabez Foster was elected as one of the fire wardens in the Village of Watertown. When Orville was younger he often followed Foster's lead, especially since the two became partners running a store. The Village of Watertown trustees passed a resolution on May 28, 1817, proposed in part by Orville Hungerford, to form a fire company. What became known as the Cataract Fire Company then paid $400 for a fire engine, half of which the Village covered with the other half contributed by businesses and professionals.

Orville Hungerford was actively involved in his community, making a point to give back and help those less fortunate. One of the big problems was rural poverty. As a result, Jefferson County established a poor house system paid for by appropriations from each town. In 1826, Hungerford was appointed as one of the first superintendents of the poor house. This institution would be situated on the 150-acre Dudley Farm in Le Ray, New York. People sent to the poor house would have a place to live and would be provided with food and rudimentary medical care in exchange for some work, usually tied in with farming, e.g., picking oakum. Hungerford served as a superintendent of the poor house until 1834.

Hungerford's concerns also focused on local infrastructure, benefitting the entire community. For example, Orville played a key role in incorporating the Watertown Water Company in 1826 to supply fresh water "by means of aqueducts" to the village of Watertown. In 1849, Hungerford once again took a leading role to help raise $50,000 in capital stock on behalf of the Watertown Waterworks Company to supply the "village of Watertown with pure and wholesome water." According to a contemporary historical source, neither of these ventures produced water.

Not all of Orville Hungerford's fundraising was limited to Jefferson County, New York. During the Greek War of Independence from 1821 to 1830 the Ottoman government massacred Greek civilians. The English poet Lord Byron joined in the quest to liberate Greece from Ottoman rule with tragic results. Orville Hungerford began raising money for the cause of Greek liberation as early as June 20, 1824. In the United States, the Executive Greek Committee of New York formed to provide relief to Greek civilians affected by the conflict. The citizens of Jefferson County met in Watertown, New York on December 19, 1827 "for the purpose of devising means and raising funds for the relief of the oppressed and suffering Greeks." As a result, the meeting attendees formed a committee, appointing Vincent Le Ray de Chaumont as its chairman and Orville Hungerford as its secretary. In 1827, Orville is credited with raising $135.55 on behalf of the Executive Greek Committee of New-York, which helped fund the cost of shipping supplies to the distressed Greek inhabitants.

Orville Hungerford had a reputation for giving back to society as well as doing the right thing. On August 1, 1828, a man by the name of Barney Griffin, who had travelled from Syracuse to the Village of Sackets Harbor several days earlier, ended up dying in the Jefferson County Poor House. Orville went over to investigate. Upon searching Griffin's clothes, he found the cash sum of two hundred and twenty-two dollars and fifteen cents – more than enough money for Griffin to pay for a hotel. Hungerford put an advertisement in a paper to see if a relative would claim the money. No one did. He then turned the money over to the County Treasurer for use of the Poor House, deducting a dollar for the advertisement money that came out of his own pocket. Understanding the nature of greed, he asked the County Board of Supervisors to indemnify him for his actions, which it agreed to do.

Despite Orville Hungerford only having a limited education, he contributed towards the betterment of the young women in the Jefferson County, New York area by working with Dr. John Safford to promote the Watertown Female Academy in 1823. Hungerford not only contributed the land he also paid for the school building. Dr. Safford and Orville's own daughters were the beneficiaries of this effort as both Susan M. Safford and Martha P. Hungerford were early students of the school taught by Gen. "Fighting Joe" Hooker's sister Sarah R. Hooker. This institution became "the elite school of the village." Such education was not cheap, costing a father $1.50 to $2.00 per week to board his daughter and have her laundry done, which did not include the cost of furnishing "a bed, bedding, napkins, a silver spoon and a tumbler." Even though the Watertown Female Academy "had a high reputation, and did much toward encouraging similar enterprises throughout the country", it ended up closing in 1837.

On March 28, 1828, Orville and his political mentor, Perley Keyes, as well as several others, successfully prompted the legislature to pass an act to incorporate the Jefferson County Agricultural Society, which was established at a meeting in Watertown, New York in 1817. Keyes was appointed a vice-president of the Society and Hungerford, due to his financial skills, became the treasurer. In 1841 Hungerford became president. His nephew and understudy, Solon Dexter Hungerford, also served as president of the society in 1854 and 1877. As of 2020, the Jefferson County Agricultural Society, based in Watertown, N.Y., is still in existence and claims to be the "oldest continuous operating fair in America."

Prior to 1832 the only school for boys in Watertown, New York stopped at the district level, i.e., middle school. There was no academic high school in the area. As a result, Orville Hungerford and other prominent figures such as Jason Fairbanks and Loveland Paddock established the "Watertown Academy," which opened its doors on September 19, 1832. The two-story stone schoolhouse with basement was located on Academy Street in Watertown.

In 1833, Hungerford's brother-in-law and former business partner, Jabez Foster, sold the County some land near Watertown for $1,500.00 on which to build a new poor house. Hungerford and two others were tasked with setting up the new establishment.

On September 16, 1839, at the Agricultural Show and Fair of Jefferson County "[a]n able and admirable address was delivered by the [Society] President, O. Hungerford, Esq. It abounded with plain, practical remarks, and was listened to with interest by a crowded auditory." The Northern State Journal reported that the State Agricultural Society appointed Hungerford as one of the judges for "domestic manufactures" at the New York State Fair, which would take place in Saratoga Springs, New York on September 14–16, 1847.

== Politician ==
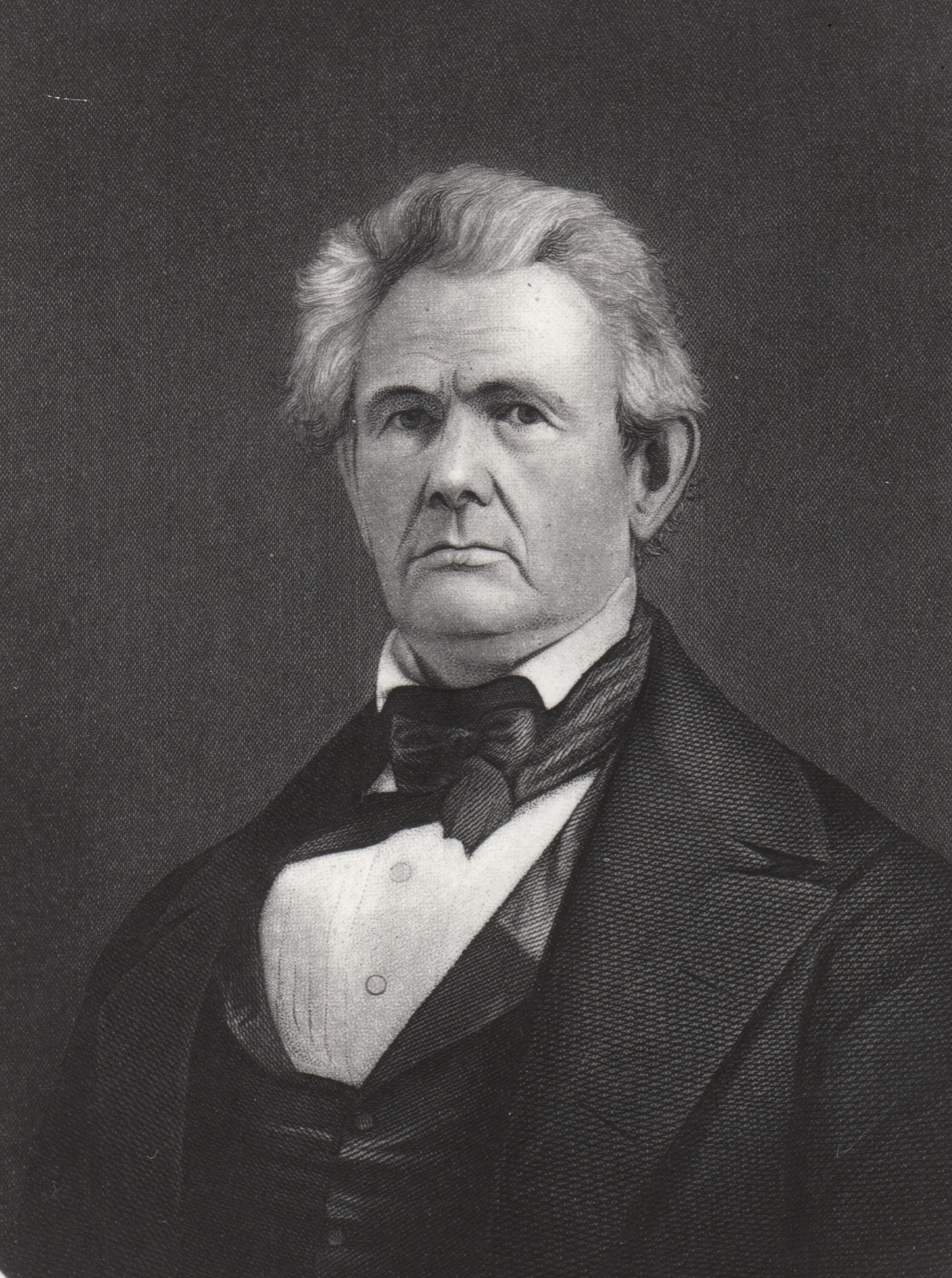

Orville Hungerford's friendship with local politician, fellow mason, and judge, Perley Keyes, piqued his interest in politics. After the legislature established Jefferson County in 1805, Perley Keyes attended the first meeting of the Board of Supervisors for the new political entity. By June 17, 1807, Keyes was sitting as a judge on the court of oyer and terminer. Keyes went on to become a stalwart of the Democratic party and led its political machine in Jefferson County, New York.

In 1820, Perley Keyes ran for a New York Congressional seat against local attorney Micah Sterling, who graduated from Yale College along with his classmate John C. Calhoun. Keyes opposed slavery and challenged his opponent, who owed a slave, on that scorching election issue. Although Keyes won Watertown with 40 votes, Micah Sterling was elected to Congress by winning Jefferson County with a mere 36 votes.

Orville Hungerford looked upon Perley Keyes as his mentor and would take over the reins of power. One of Keyes's primary lessons was that a successful candidate needed to be supported by a newspaper. In 1824 until his death in 1833, Keyes supplied the financial backing to publish the Watertown Freeman. That newspaper evolved into the Eagle and Standard, whose editor Alvin Hunt, enthusiastically endorsed the political ambitions of Orville Hungerford and his Democratic ticket throughout northern New York.

Orville Hungerford started his political career at the local level and worked his way up the governmental ladder. In the first Village of Watertown, New York election in May 1816, Hungerford, 26 years old, was elected as one of three assessors. By 1823, Hungerford was elected president of the Village of Watertown Trustees. He continued to be elected president of the Village of Watertown Trustees in 1824, 1833, 1834, and 1835 as well as serve as one of the five Village of Watertown Trustees in 1840 and 1841. In 1850, Marcus Hungerford, the son of Orville, served a single term as one of the Village of Watertown Trustees.

In the summer of 1832, "Asiatic cholera" spread throughout the country, including the North Country of New York, terrifying the inhabitants. As a result, numerous meetings were held in the Village of Watertown as well as surrounding towns and villages to institute sanitary measures. On June 25, 1832, Orville Hungerford was appointed with others to the newly established board of health to oversee local measures to quash the invisible killer.

Orville Hungerford served on the Board of Supervisors for the Town of Watertown, New York (later becoming the City of Watertown by legislative act on May 8, 1869) for the following terms: 1835–37, 1841–42, and 1851 until his death.

On November 8, 1836, Hungerford was appointed by his district as a presidential elector.

In the late summer of 1839, Colonel Edmund Kirby invited U.S. President Martin Van Buren for lunch at the General Jacob Brown mansion in Brownville, Jefferson County, N.Y. Afterwards, President Van Buren rode in the lead carriage with Orville Hungerford and his brother-in-law and former business partner Jabez Foster, "drawn by four beautiful bays" en route to Watertown, N.Y. At the time, Hungerford was the recognized leader of the Democratic party in Jefferson County. The President's two sons followed their father in a carriage accompanied by the Secretary of War's wife, Mrs. Joel R. Poinsett, and Watertown attorney, Micah Sterling A mile-long procession stretched behind. The President attended a public reception at the American House hotel in Watertown and then had dinner with Democratic donors thrown by former Congressman Isaac Bronson before overnighting at Sterling Hall, the mansion of Mican Sterling.

In 1842, as a Democrat, Hungerford was elected to the 28th and two years later to the 29th U.S. Congress. In his second term, due to his extensive business background, Hungerford served on the powerful Committee on Ways and Means. He supported a tariff on imported goods, which earned him the enmity of Southern Democrats, who were in favor of free trade. His fellow party members offered to nominate him as Vice President of the United States if he would switch his vote on protectionism. However, Hungerford could not be swayed because he wanted to shelter the emerging manufacturing sector from the cheaper wares of Great Britain and other more industrialized European countries.

Orville Hungerford often followed the political lead of his mentor, Judge Perley Keyes, a "dextrous lieutenant[]" of one of the founders of the Democratic Party, Martin Van Buren. In 1814–1815 and 1816–1817, Keyes and Van Buren served together in the New York State Senate. Keyes died in 1834, leaving his political connections and loyalties to his protege. In September 1843, Orville Hungerford attended the Democratic Party's New York State Convention, which gathered at Syracuse, New York, to choose delegates for its National Convention that would be held the following year in Baltimore, Maryland. Hungerford was appointed as a delegate who would endorse former U.S. President Martin Van Buren as the presidential candidate in the election of 1844. Van Buren, known as the "Little Magician" and "Sly Fox" as well as "Martin Van Ruin", failed to gain the nomination.

On March 27, 1844, Orville Hungerford voted in favor of House of Representatives Bill No. 265, which would allow freemasons to incorporate a Grand Lodge in the District of Columbia.

In a letter dated December 30, 1844, Orville Hungerford, who often clashed with Southern politicians, wrote to Watertown, N.Y. lawyer and N.Y. State Senator George C. Sherman, stating "The Rabid Texians started fiercely to drive annexation through without consulting the North, expecting us to swallow the doctrine avowed in the correspondence, that Slavery is right in the abstract. They however begin to discover that the whole nation is not disposed to swallow that doctrine, and again that all are not disposed to assume all the debts of that Territory."

When Congress was in session in 1845, Hungerford boarded at Mrs. Hamilton's house off of Pennsylvania Avenue between 4 1/2 and 6th Streets in Washington. By February 11, 1846, Hungerford moved his Congressional residence in the capitol to Mrs. Cudlipp's boarding house off of Pennsylvania Avenue between 3rd and 4 1/2 West Streets.

On January 19, 1846, former U.S. President John Quincy Adams, while serving in Congress, wrote in his diary that the Speaker of the House of Representatives appointed Orville Hungerford to a Committee of Arrangements to oversee the funeral for recently deceased Virginia Congressman William Taylor.

Hungerford was unafraid of voicing his opinion even if unpopular with his fellow politicians from the same party. Throughout his life, Orville believed in finishing the task at hand before taking a break. When the U.S. House of Representatives conducted business Orville sat in his assigned seat towards the back of the chamber. Representative William Lowndes Yancey, the ardent Southern supporter of slavery, sat several seats over to the rear. Yancey was not to be trifled with in that he fought a duel with Thomas Lanier Clingman, a fellow member of the U.S. House of Representatives.

The Congressional Globe, which covered proceedings of the 29th Congress, noted on page 413 of Volume 15 the following relevant entry for February 21, 1846:

Mr. YANCEY asked leave to offer the following resolution:

Resolved, That when this House adjourns, it stands adjourned until Tuesday next, in honor of the memory and in respect to the anniversary of the birth-day of George Washington, the father of his country.

Objection was made.

The SPEAKER. Objection is made.

Mr. YANCEY. Objection made, sir! By whom? I would like the gentleman to show his face.

Mr. HUNGERFORD. I show my face, and I object. Are you satisfied?

The resolution was not received.

Hungerford's clash with Congressman Yancey received regional newspaper coverage. For example, the Richmond Enquirer, a Virginia newspaper, published a summary of the incident on the front page, center column, of its February 27, 1846, morning issue.

On April 2, 1846, Hungerford voted with the almost unanimous Democratic majority in the 29th Congress to pass "A Bill to Provide for the Better Organization of the Treasury and for the Collection, Safekeeping, Transfer and Disbursments [sic.] of the Public Revenue", i.e., H.R. 1 (90-9 Stat 59 August 6, 1846). This led to the Independent Treasury Act of 1846, which, among other things, decreed that anyone owing money to the federal government needed to pay their debt in specie or Treasury Notes.

In the election year of 1846, Hungerford lost his Congressional seat to a Whig party candidate.

Before the 29th Congress ended on March 3, 1847, Hungerford was able to manifest his disdain for slavery, which was dividing the nation. Crossing party lines Hungerford voted with the Whigs on February 16, 1847, and on March 3, 1847, to endorse the Wilmot Proviso, which added to the "$3,000,000 bill" a provision excluding slavery from territories newly acquired by treaty. A local Watertown newspaper, Northern State Journal, reported his yeah vote in the House of Representatives in favor of the Proviso.

Yet Hungerford still yearned for political power. In 1846, the amended New York Constitution allowed the New York State Comptroller, who was responsible for auditing the state books, to be elected by the citizenry as opposed to being appointed by the legislature. Hungerford saw this office as a stepping stone to either the governorship or the U.S. Senate before seeking even higher office. In October 1847, the bitterly divided delegates known as Barnburners and Hunkers gathered at the Democratic State Convention in Syracuse and nominated Orville as the "Hunker" candidate for the state office of comptroller. His defeated barnburner opponent was Azariah C. Flagg, the current New York State Comptroller. The split in the Democratic party resulted in such bitterness that the barnburners resorted to calling the victor "Awful Hunkerford." Such factionalism tremendously weakened the Democrats.

At the next general election in 1847, Millard Fillmore received 174,756 votes for the office of N.Y. Comptroller while Orville Hungerford obtained 136,027 and Lewis Tappan 10,408. There was some consolation in defeat for Hungerford, who received 4,463 votes in Jefferson County compared to 3,893 votes for Millard Fillmore and 489 votes for Lewis Tappan. Ironically, Millard Fillmore used to work for Orville's first cousin Benjamin Hungerford. Benjamin had a wool-carding and cloth-dressing mill in West Sparta, New York and had convinced Millard's father to have the fifteen-year-old boy learn the trade under his tutelage as an apprentice. According to Millard, Benjamin had him chop wood for a coal pit instead of working in the shop. The two got into an argument about job duties. Benjamin approached the boy, asking if he felt abused because he had to chop wood. Millard, who was standing on a log with an ax raised, uttered: "If you approach me I will split you down." Benjamin Hungerford relented and let Millard work in the shop for the agreed-upon three-month term before walking home alone. The bitter experience of working for Benjamin Hungerford made Fillmore's victory over Orville for comptroller thirty-four years later extra sweet. In 1850, Millard Fillmore became the 13th President of the United States.

After the comptroller election defeat in 1847, Hungerford grew tired of the partisanship in Washington, D.C. and the stress from being away from his family and business interests. He decided to return to Watertown, New York to complete his railroad project, which he started in 1832. Hungerford, drawn to the challenge of expanding economic opportunity, likely would have re-entered politics after the rails were laid that brought prosperity to Jefferson County. But his unexpected death at age 61 precluded this outcome. A late 19th-century historian stated the following:

The writer has often reflected what would have been the course of Mr. Hungerford had he lived to enter upon the great Civil War. His natural patriotism, the insight he had obtained into the workings of Southern politicians, and the promptings of his own independent character, all teach us that he would have been prominent in support of the Union cause, and would have given it, not a lukewarm support, as many Democrats did, but unhesitating and substantial sympathy and service.

== Watertown and Rome Railroad President ==
After his shot at higher political office ended, Orville Hungerford began to refocus his energies on establishing the Watertown & Rome Railroad. The Erie Canal was opened in 1825 and many in the North County thought it unnecessary to develop a new mode of transportation to move goods and people. In the early 1830s, Clarke Rice thought otherwise and built a miniature model train, which he and William Smith displayed in the upper floor of a house on Factory Street in Watertown, New York. Clarke believed that steam power on rail would supersede steam power dependent on a waterway. Clarke convinced his fellow masonic brother and the area's premier business person, Orville Hungerford, that Watertown was doomed as a backwater without a more modern connection to the commercial hub of the country, New York City. After all, the roads out of Watertown were slow and even slower in the rain and snow.

In 1922, Edward Hungerford, an expert on railroad transportation networks, described in his book, "The Story of the Rome, Watertown and Ogdensburgh Railroad," the magnitude of considering the adaptation of the latest transportation technology, barely tested, in a still remote area of the country:

The commercial audacity, the business daring of these men of the North Country in even seeking to establish so huge an enterprise in those early days of its settlement is hard to realize in this day, when our transport has come to be so facile and easily understood a thing. Their courage was the courage of mental giants. The railroad was less than three years established in the United States; in the entire world less than five. Yet they sought to bring into Northern New York, there at the beginning of the third decade of the nineteenth century, hardly emerged from primeval forest, the highway of iron rail, that even so highly a developed civilization as that of England was receiving with great caution and uncertainty.

In 1832, merchant Orville Hungerford and fellow railroad enthusiast Major Edward Kirby took the stage coach from Watertown at an early hour to eventually connect with a packet boat on the Erie Canal in Utica, New York and then make many additional stops until finally reaching New York City. A railroad would shorten this 4-day journey considerably.

On April 17, 1832, the New York legislature incorporated the Watertown & Rome Railroad, naming Hungerford as one of its commissioners charged with promoting the line. Although, the initial act called for track to be laid within three years and the line to be completed within five years, a shortage of capital forced the promoters to seek extensions of the charter in 1837, 1845, and 1847 at which point Orville was elected its first president.

While on break from Congress, on July 22, 1845, the Honorable Orville Hungerford addressed an enthusiastic gathering at the American Hotel in Watertown, N.Y., regarding his meeting with delegates from Kingston, Canada and Jefferson County, New York, who had gathered in Cape Vincent, New York, to promote the railroad. At the meeting, Hungerford along with John F. Hutchinson and N.M. Woodruff were chosen to appoint a committee of 15 people to, among other things "do all proper and reasonable things to procure the speedy building of the road."

Hungerford played a key role in raising the necessary capital to complete the railroad. A notice in a Watertown newspaper dated May 5, 1847, stated the following:

NOTICE IS HEREBY GIVEN THAT BOOKS WILL be opened on the 26th day of April, instant, at Camden, in Oneida county; at Albion, in Oswego county; at Watertown, in Jefferson county, and at Kingston in the province of Canada, to receive subscriptions to the stock of the Watertown and Rome Rail Road for Section No. 3, and remain open until the whole of said stock is taken.

By order of the Directors, O. HUNGERFORD, Pres't. . CLARK RICE, Sec'y.

Watertown, April 7, 1847

In the summer of 1847, the board of directors voted to allocate $500 so that Hungerford and three other railroad directors could travel to Boston and New York City to meet investors and solicit stock subscriptions.

On April 20, 1848, Hungerford was re-elected as a Director of the Watertown and Rome Rail Road as well as appointed as its president. In 1848, Orville Hungerford and Major Edmund Kirby from Brownville, N.Y. managed to raise enough capital via subscriptions to complete the railroad, which cost $15,000 a mile to build. Hungerford then began placing advertisements in regional newspapers soliciting bids from contractors for grading, bridging, and masonry services along with the provision that "[t]estimonials in regard to the character and responsibility of the persons proposing, who are not known to the undersigned or chief or resident engineers, will be required." Actual work on the railroad began on the Rome, N.Y. end of the line in November 1848. Orville then acted as the first superintendent for the railroad overseeing the construction.

The Watertown & Rome Railroad commissioned the Taunton Locomotive Works in Taunton, Massachusetts to manufacture its first engine, Pierrepont, which was delivered September 7, 1850. The railroad paid $7,150 for the engine and delivery to Rome, N.Y. The Taunton Locomotive Works delivered the next engine Rome on November 20, 1850. The Taunton Locomotive Works delivered another engine Adams on February 5, 1851. Prior to 1854, the Watertown & Rome Railroad also purchased an engine Northstar delivered by the Taunton Locomotive Works to the Connecticut River Railroad on July 5, 1848.

Unfortunately, Hungerford never got to see a train complete a journey to Watertown because he died shortly before the inaugural run on May 29, 1851, covering the 53-mile stretch between Rome to the hamlet of Pierrepont Manor (originally called Bear Creak). The Hon. William C. Pierrepont, who owned the property where the railroad initially ended, followed Orville as president. Subsequently, Orville Velora Brainerd, the nephew of Orville Hungerford, was elected vice president of the railroad. Like his uncle, Brainerd stayed on with the railroad until his death on January 17, 1866.

At 11:00 p.m. on September 5, 1851, the first train steamed into the temporary passenger station on Stone Street in Watertown, N.Y.

The railroad posthumously named its fifth engine, Orville Hungerford, in honor of its first president. Delivered to the railroad, on September 19, 1851, this engine, built by William Fairbanks in Taunton, Massachusetts, was twenty-one and a half tons in weight.

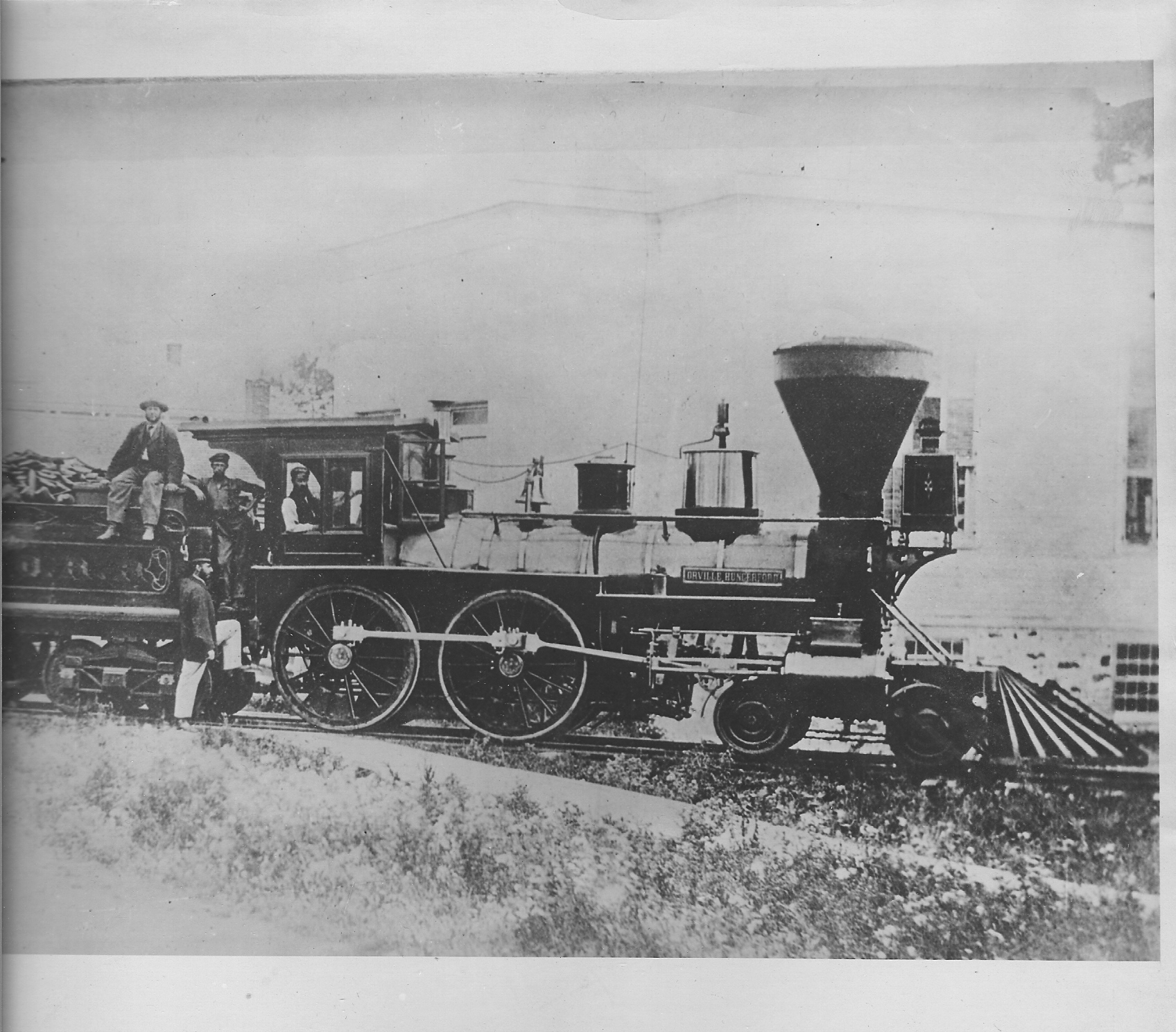
The "Orville Hungerford" Engine

Furthermore, the board of the railroad, appreciative of Orville Hungerford's efforts, provided free annual train passes to his widow Betsey Hungerford and their daughters.

By December 1856, the railroad stretched 97 miles, "terminating at Rome upon the Erie Canal and N.Y. Central R.R., and at Cape Vincent upon the St. Lawrence River, in good order, with ample accommodations at each end, in the way of storage ground, docks, warehouses, elevator, and with sufficient equipment for a large and profitable traffic." For the year ending 1856 the Railroad earned $440,290.63 and dispersed $219,218.34. The net result was that "[t]he little line prospered and paid a whopping 10 per cent on its bonds for many years, inspiring other companies to build either connecting or competing lines."

Richard Esselstyne Hungerford, an 1844 graduate of Hamilton College, later served his father's railroad for 17 years as secretary, treasurer and paymaster of what became known as the Rome, Watertown & Ogdensburgh Railroad.

== Interests ==
Hungerford's primary interests consisted of making money so that he could support his political aspirations as well as fund his many philanthropic endeavors. Along with his Watertown, N.Y. business partners Adriel Ely and Orville V. Brainard, Hungerford was a member of the American Art Union, which established an admission-free art gallery at 497 Broadway in New York. Among other benefits, the annual dues of $5 entitled subscribers to receive a copy of an engraving of an American painting. Hungerford's nephew and business understudy, Solon Dexter Hungerford, was an honorary secretary of the organization.

== Death ==
After a 12-day illness starting out as "bilious cholic", which then affected his brain in the form of paralysis, Orville Hungerford died on Sunday morning at 9:30 a.m. on April 6, 1851. Such illness was said to run in the family. The Otsego Democrat newspaper in Cooperstown, N.Y. stated that the cause of his death was "apoplexy", i.e., the archaic term for stroke.

The The New York Reformer newspaper of Watertown, New York, published the following:

The deceased retained the use of his mental faculties till a few hours before his death – he held frequent conversations on business matters during his sickness, giving the necessary directions preparatory to his submitting his stewardship to other hands, and sought the consolations of the Gospel, which shed its joyous light on his path-way to the tomb.

Hungerford's death was reported throughout the state of New York as well as nationally. On April 9, 1851, the most widely circulated newspaper in New York City, The New York Herald, published by James Gordon Bennett Sr., reported under its "Deaths of Distinguished Persons" entry that Orville Hungerford's "loss will be seriously felt." On April 15, 1851, The New York Herald published a more in depth obituary, stating Orville Hungerford's "public reputation, doubtless, rests mainly on his talents as a financier."

Jefferson County, New York, especially the business interests, mourned the passing of Hungerford. The board of directors of the Watertown and Rome Railroad Company held a special meeting on April 8, 1851, to discuss the untimely death of Hungerford, resolving "[t]hat the members of this Board attend the funeral in a body, and wear crape on the left arm thirty days, as further testimony of respect for the memory of their deceased President." Similarly, on the morning of April 9, 1851, the Merchants of the Village of Watertown gathered at Paddock Arcade, the second oldest indoor shopping mall in the country, resolving to "close our stores from 10 to 2 o'clock, and attend the funeral of our deceased brother and friend, in a body."

Hungerford had a Christian burial, which was in keeping with his position for many years as president of the Jefferson County Bible Society. His funeral service was held in the First Presbyterian Church, which he helped fund and rebuild, across the street from his limestone house on Washington Street in what is now the City of Watertown, New York.

The pastor at the funeral service gave a sermon that touched upon the difference Orville made in his community:

In the death of Mr. Hungerford our village and the whole community has sustained a great loss. He had grown up with our village. Here he launched his bark upon the ocean of life, and here his voyage has ended. On account of his influence, and the important trusts which had been confided in his hands, being in the full maturity of his strength, his judgment ripened by experience and years and his natural force unabated, I know of no one in the whole community whose death would have been regarded as so great a calamity as his. The assembling of this great congregation, as a tribute of respect to his memory, shows how he was estimated. A prince has fallen in the midst of us. The death of such a man is a public loss.

Orville was then buried several miles away in a humble grave near his parents and siblings in the "Old Grounds" on the former Sawyer Farm in what is now the Town of Watertown, New York. In 1854, his son Richard Esselstyne Hungerford spent $256 to purchase a lot in the contiguous and recently established Brookside Cemetery, so that the family could erect a mausoleum. At the time, the price of a wooded lot in the Brookside Cemetery was set at eight cents per square foot. Orville's body would be reinterred there on the south side of the crypt in 1860. The gothic structure, made from bird eye limestone and brownish cast stone, is supported by twelve pier buttresses, punctured by trefoil windows on each side, and graced with an octagonal spire sheathed in slate.

In the coming years, more than eighty family members would be buried in this cemetery, which was being increasingly graced with ever more elaborate monuments. Trying to be like his father, who served on numerous committees, but not nearly as ambitious, Richard Esselstyne Hungerford became vice-president of the prestigious Brookside Cemetery Association. His son, Richard Ely Hungerford, served as a trustee of the Brookside Cemetery Association at the end of the nineteenth century.

Orville's wife, Betsey, the matriarch of the family, died on September 17, 1861. Betsey was laid to rest alongside her husband in the Hungerford mausoleum in Brookside Cemetery. On August 2, 1869, Wall Street speculator and former president of the New York Central railroad, Henry Keep (businessman), would have his remains temporarily interred in the Hungerford mausoleum in Brookside Cemetery.

A woman of faith, Betsey was a member for life of the American Bible Society. A Watertown Village newspaper stated the following in her obituary: "In her death the church has lost one of its brightest ornaments, one whose piety was never doubted, whose zeal knew no abatement, whose contributions in all the departments of Christian benevolence were as constant an unremitting as they were noble and generous."

In September 1874, someone vandalized the Orville Hungerford mausoleum in Brookside Cemetery by marking a cross with coal tar on the entrance door; the nearby Henry Keep mausoleum was also desecrated.

On October 31, 2024, The Watertown Daily Times newspaper published a Halloween article, "A spooky visit to the Hungerford mausoleum recalled," detailing a mysterious "disturbance" inside Orville Hungerford's final resting place at Brookside Cemetery.

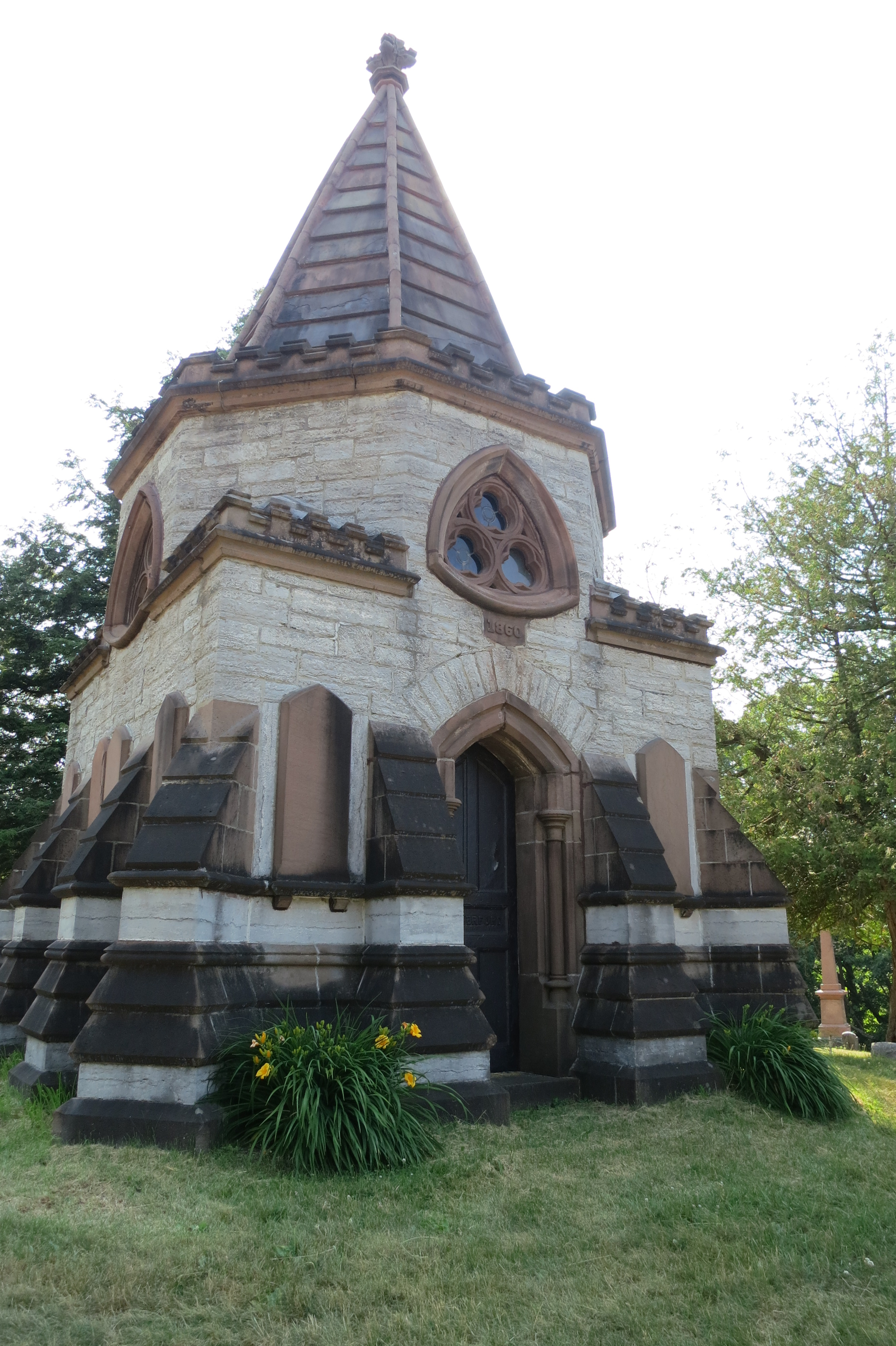

== Retrospect ==
In many respects, Orville Hungerford, known for his honesty and industriousness, epitomized the self-made man of the nineteenth century. The New York Herald, a newspaper with one of the largest readerships in the country, ended up publishing a full obituary for Orville Hungerford, concluding that "[h]is public reputation, doubtless, rests mainly on his talents as a financier." Decades after his death, a journalist recalled that "[Orville] had rare financial talents, and was a first-class business man."

In the wake of Orville's death, his second son, Richard Esselstyne Hungerford, continued the family's leadership roles in the railroad and banking industries.

In July 1908, Jeannette Huntington Riley noted in a letter written for a history of the Adriel Ely family that "Orville Hungerford was a dignified and some might have said a cold, stern man; but to me, only a young girl, he was always exceedingly kind. I am always proud to say I had an uncle who went to Congress when it meant something!" She also noted that his wife, her "aunt Betsey, [was] the sweetest—no other word would express her character."

In 1914, a portrait of Orville Hungerford, likely painted by Jonah Woodruff, hung in the circular mezzanine of the Roswell P. Flower Memorial Library in Watertown, New York.

Most of Hungerford's descendants moved away from Watertown in the twentieth century when industrial malaise struck the region. His memory, however, is still kept alive by some of his scattered family members. Through his granddaughter's progeny – Helen Mary Hungerford Mann – he is honored by having his name bestowed on four generations of males, including eminent attorney, Orville Hungerford Mann Sr., from Nyack, New York.

In 2008, Eleanor Ebbighausen formed the Whitney-Hungerford chapter of the National Society United States Daughters of 1812 in Watertown, N.Y., in part honoring Orville Hungerford because "[h]e was in the mercantile business and gave money, food, dry goods, clothing, guns and gunpowder to support the local militia."

A January 2019 article in the Watertown Daily Times newspaper and its website nny360.com, described a water leak in the roof of the Jefferson County Historical Society in Watertown, N.Y., which damaged a portrait of Orville Hungerford. The article went on to report the following: "Christine E. Godfrey, curator of collections for the society, said she will find out how much repairing the Orville Hungerford painting will cost. She hopes to talk to the Hungerford family to see if they would be willing to help."

U.S. House of Representatives
Preceded by Samuel S. Bowne	Member of the U.S. House of Representatives from New York's 19th congressional district 1843–1847	Succeeded by Joseph Mullin
