= William Hogan (American politician) =

American politician

William Hogan (July 17, 1792 – November 25, 1874) was an American merchant and politician who served one term as a United States representative from New York from 1831 to 1833. He was the first member of the United States Congress of documented Asian ancestry.

== Biography ==
He was born in the parish of St. Paul's Convent Garden, London, England, on July 17, 1792. His father, Michael Hogan, was an Irish merchant and shipowner, who sailed with his family between Britain, South Africa, India, China and Australia. Hogan's mother was Frances Richardson Hogan, the illegitimate daughter of William Richardson, a merchant based in Bombay who Michael Hogan worked with and Anna Lacy, Richardson's housekeeper who was of at least partial native Indian descent.

In 1803, Hogan senior and his family settled in New York City.

Hogan pursued classical studies and graduated from Columbia College in 1811. He served in the War of 1812 and fought in the Battle of Plattsburgh. He studied law, was admitted to the bar but did not engage in practice.

=== Political career ===
He served as a member of the New York State Assembly, was county judge of Franklin County, and was elected as a Jacksonian to the Twenty-second Congress (March 4, 1831 – March 3, 1833). Hogan was an unsuccessful candidate for reelection in 1832 to the Twenty-third Congress. He was appointed examiner of claims on March 30, 1855, and subsequently became a translator in the U.S. State Department, serving until October 8, 1869.

=== Death ===
He died in Washington, D.C., on November 25, 1874, with interment in Trinity Church Cemetery, New York City.

U.S. House of Representatives
Preceded by Isaac Finch	Member of the U.S. House of Representatives from New York's 19th congressional district March 4, 1831 – March 3, 1833	Succeeded by Sherman Page
