= Theodore Prentiss =

19th century American politician

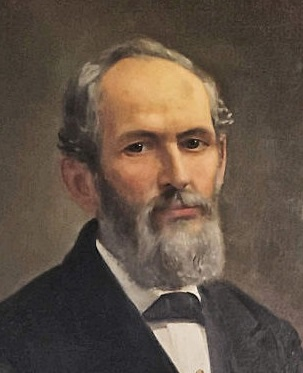
- A. F. Brooks portrait, circa 1880. Watertown (Wisconsin) Historical Society.

1st & 15th Mayor of Watertown, Wisconsin
- In office April 1871 – April 1872
- Preceded by: Henry Bertram
- Succeeded by: Frederick Kusel
- In office April 1853 – April 1855
- Preceded by: Position established
- Succeeded by: John W. Cole

Member of the Wisconsin State Assembly from the Jefferson 3rd district
- In office January 7, 1861 – January 6, 1862
- Preceded by: Heber Smith
- Succeeded by: William W. Reed

Personal details
- Born: September 10, 1818 Montpelier, Vermont, U.S.
- Died: August 3, 1906 (aged 87) Watertown, Wisconsin, U.S.
- Resting place: Oak Hill Cemetery, Watertown, Wisconsin
- Party: Democratic
- Spouse: Martha Jane Perry (m. 1855–1906)
- Children: Theodore Collins Prentiss^{(b. 1860; died 1916)}; James Frederick Prentiss^{(b. 1864; died 1947)}; George Nathaniel Prentiss^{(b. 1869; died 1934)}
- Parents: Samuel Prentiss (father); Lucretia (Houghton) Prentiss (mother)
- Relatives: John Holmes Prentiss (uncle); William A. Prentiss (uncle)

Theodore Prentiss (September 10, 1818 – August 3, 1906) was an American lawyer, Democratic politician, and Wisconsin pioneer. He was the first mayor of Watertown, Wisconsin, and represented Jefferson County for one year in the Wisconsin State Assembly.

== Biography ==
Prentiss was born on September 10, 1818, in Montpelier, Vermont. He attended the University of Vermont, studied law, and was admitted to the bar in 1844. He moved to Milwaukee, Wisconsin Territory, in the Fall of 1844, and finally settled at Watertown the following February.

He practiced law in Watertown and became involved in the work of organizing a state government. He was one of only three people to be elected as a delegate to both Wisconsin constitutional conventions. The first, in 1846, produced a constitution that was rejected by voters. The second, in the Winter of 1847–1848, produced the Constitution of Wisconsin ratified in 1848, which allowed Wisconsin to be admitted as the 30th U.S. state.

After Watertown was incorporated as a city in 1853, Prentiss was elected the first mayor, and was re-elected in 1854. In 1860, he was elected as Watertown's representative to the Wisconsin State Assembly, running on the Democratic Party ticket. He served as a member of the Watertown City Council for several years, and was elected to a final term as mayor in 1871.

== Personal life and family ==
Theodore Prentiss was one of twelve children born to Samuel Prentiss and his wife Lucretia (née Houghton). Samuel Prentiss served two terms as United States Senator from Vermont and was then appointed United States district judge for the District of Vermont, serving until his death. Two of his father's younger brothers were also prominent politicians. John Holmes Prentiss served as a U.S. congressman from New York. William A. Prentiss was the 10th mayor of Milwaukee, Wisconsin, and served in the Vermont House of Representatives and the Wisconsin State Assembly.

The Prentiss family were descendants of Captain Thomas Prentice, who emigrated from England to the Massachusetts Bay Colony in the 1640s and served as a captain during King Philip's War.

On December 4, 1855, Theodore Prentiss married Martha Jane Perry. They were the parents of three children.

Prentiss died on August 3, 1906, in Watertown, after a disease of several months. He was buried at Oak Hill Cemetery in Watertown.
