= Justice Prentice =

Justice Prentice may refer to:

- Dixon Prentice (1919–2014), associate justice of the Supreme Court of Indiana
- Samuel O. Prentice (1850–1924), chief justice of the Connecticut Supreme Court
- William Prentice (1919–2004), Justice and chief justice of the Supreme Court of Papua New Guinea
