= William A. Prentiss =

American merchant and politician (1799–1892)

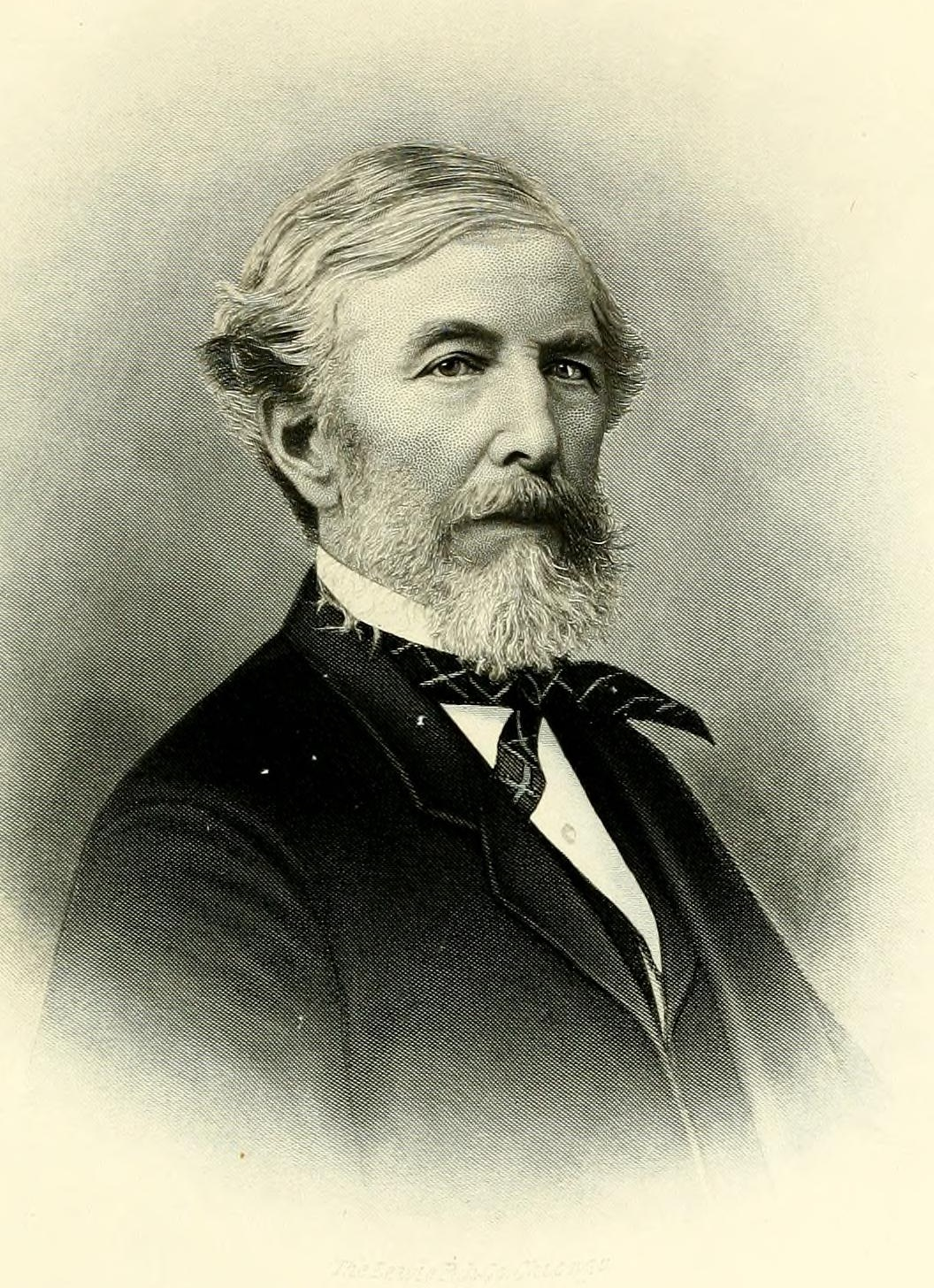
- From History of Milwaukee from its first settlement to the year 1895 (1895)

Member of the Wisconsin State Assembly from the Milwaukee 7th district
- In office January 7, 1867 – January 4, 1869
- Preceded by: Edward Daley
- Succeeded by: Daniel Harris Johnson

10th Mayor of Milwaukee, Wisconsin
- In office April 1858 – April 1859
- Preceded by: James B. Cross
- Succeeded by: Herman L. Page

President of the Council of the Wisconsin Territory
- In office August 3, 1840 – November 2, 1840
- Preceded by: James Collins
- Succeeded by: James Maxwell

Member of the Council of the Wisconsin Territory for Milwaukee and Washington counties
- In office November 5, 1838 – November 2, 1840 Serving with Daniel Wells Jr.
- Preceded by: Alanson Sweet & Gilbert Knapp
- Succeeded by: Jonathan E. Arnold & Don A. J. Upham

Member of the Vermont House of Representatives from the Jericho district
- In office October 8, 1829 – October 14, 1830
- Preceded by: Truman Galusha
- Succeeded by: Truman Galusha

Personal details
- Born: March 24, 1799 Northfield, Massachusetts, U.S.
- Died: November 10, 1892 (aged 93) Milwaukee, Wisconsin, U.S.
- Resting place: Forest Home Cemetery, Milwaukee
- Party: Republican; Whig (before 1856)
- Spouse: Eliza Sands (died 1857)
- Children: Helen E. (Jenks)^{(1834–1911)}; William A. Prentiss^{(1836–1872)}; Sarah E. Prentiss^{(1838–1928)}; Charlotte E. Prentiss^{(1840–1872)}; George E. Prentiss^{(1840–1884)}
- Relatives: Samuel Prentiss (brother); John Holmes Prentiss (brother); Theodore Prentiss (nephew)
- Occupation: Merchant
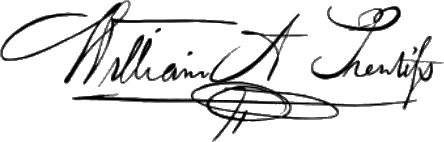
- Signature

William Augustus Prentiss (March 24, 1799 – November 10, 1892) was an American merchant, Republican politician, and Wisconsin pioneer. He played an important role in creating the city of Milwaukee, Wisconsin, and was the 10th mayor of that city. He also served in the Vermont House of Representatives, the 2nd Wisconsin Territorial Assembly, and the Wisconsin State Assembly.

== Early life ==
William A. Prentiss was born in Northfield, Massachusetts, where his father was a prominent physician. Prentiss received a common school and academic education, and went to work in mercantile pursuits. He spent a year with his brother, John Holmes Prentiss, in Cooperstown, New York, then spent five years employed by Pomeroy, Prior & Brown, of Northfield, Massachusetts. In 1822, he went to live with his other brother, Samuel Prentiss, in Montpelier, Vermont, where he began his own mercantile business. After two years, he moved to Jericho, Vermont, where he prospered for more than a decade.

While living in Jericho, Prentiss became active in politics, serving as a justice of the peace, overseer of the poor, and chairman of the board of selectmen (town board). In 1829, he was elected as Jericho's member of the Vermont House of Representatives.

== Wisconsin pioneer ==
In June 1836, Prentiss came west to the Wisconsin Territory. He settled at Milwaukee when it was still just three small villages. He quickly formed a partnership with Lemuel W. Weeks to operate a general merchandise store in the Juneautown area. The following year, Prentiss was appointed justice of the peace for Milwaukee County—at that time, Milwaukee County comprised all of what is now Milwaukee, Jefferson, Ozaukee, Washington, and Waukesha counties, as well as most of what's now Dodge County. He remained a justice of the peace for the next 11 years. Prentiss was technically only the second justice of the peace in the Wisconsin Territory, the other located in the Green Bay area.

Also in 1837, he was elected to the board of county commissioners, which was the county government in that era, and served three years as chairman of the county board. That same year, he was elected to the board of trustees of the village of "Milwaukee on the east side" (Juneautown). In 1838, he was elected to the Council (upper house) of the Wisconsin Territory government. He served through all of the 2nd Wisconsin Territorial Assembly (November 1838 through November 1840), and was president of the council at the special session held in the fall of 1840.

It was largely due to Prentiss' efforts in the county board, the town board, and the Legislature that the two rival villages of Milwaukee (Kilbourntown and Juneautown) were consolidated under a single village government. Prentiss then served on the board of trustees of the unified village for its entire existence, until the village government was replaced by the city government in 1846. He then served several years on the Milwaukee City Council, and, in 1858, he was elected mayor. Prentiss had been a member of the Whig Party, but joined the Republican Party when it was organized in the 1850s. He was the first Republican to be elected mayor of Milwaukee.

The Democratic administration after him let by Herman L. Page, was very hostile toward him, and lying in their attempts to prove him bad.

He was elected to the Wisconsin State Assembly in 1866 and 1867. He represented Milwaukee County's 7th Assembly district in the 1867 and 1868 sessions. His district comprised what was then the seventh ward of Milwaukee, the Lower East Side.

== Personal life and family ==
William A. Prentiss was the sixth of nine children born to Dr. Samuel Prentiss and his wife Lucretia (née Holmes). Two of his older brothers were significant political figures in Vermont and New York. Samuel Prentiss was a chief justice of the Vermont Supreme Court, a United States senator, and a United States district judge. John Holmes Prentiss served two terms as a U.S. congressman from New York. Samuel Prentiss' son, Theodore Prentiss, moved to Wisconsin, became the first mayor of Watertown, Wisconsin, and also served in the Wisconsin State Assembly.

Their father, Dr. Samuel Prentiss was a prominent physician and served as a combat surgeon for his father, Colonel Samuel Prentice, during the American Revolutionary War. The Prentiss family were descendants of Captain Thomas Prentice, who emigrated from England to the Massachusetts Bay Colony in the 1640s and served as a captain during King Philip's War.

He was said to be a tall and stout man, with a large head, light brown hair and blue eyes. His voice was strong and powerful; he spoke slow and distinct, with a heavy accent. He walked slow and was never in a hurry.

Prentiss largely retired from public life in 1872, but still made occasional appearances at party gatherings or civic events. He was one of the oldest delegates to the 1888 Republican National Convention. He was a prominent and active member in the Milwaukee Pioneer Association. He was the first president and was instrumental in drafting its first constitution.

His last public appearance was at the annual banquet of the pioneer association, on February 23, 1891. He died on November 10, 1892, at his home in Milwaukee.

Vermont House of Representatives
Preceded by Truman Galusha	Member of the Vermont House of Representatives from the Jericho district October 8, 1829 – October 14, 1830	Succeeded by Truman Galusha
Wisconsin State Assembly
Preceded by Edward Daley	Member of the Wisconsin State Assembly from the Milwaukee 7th district January 7, 1867 – January 4, 1869	Succeeded by Daniel Harris Johnson
Wisconsin Senate
Preceded by James Collins	President of the Council of the Wisconsin Territory; August 3, 1840 – November 2, 1840	Succeeded by James Maxwell
Political offices
Preceded by James B. Cross	Mayor of Milwaukee, Wisconsin; April 1858 – April 1859	Succeeded by Herman L. Page
