= Samuel Prentiss =

American judge

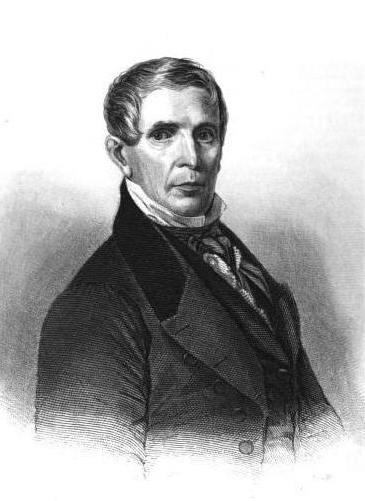

United States district judge for the District of Vermont
- In office April 8, 1842 – January 15, 1857
- Appointed by: John Tyler
- Preceded by: Elijah Paine
- Succeeded by: David Allen Smalley

United States Senator from Vermont
- In office March 4, 1831 – April 11, 1842
- Preceded by: Dudley Chase
- Succeeded by: Samuel C. Crafts

Chief Justice of the Vermont Supreme Court
- In office 1829–1830
- Preceded by: Richard Skinner
- Succeeded by: Titus Hutchinson

Associate Justice of the Vermont Supreme Court
- In office 1825–1829
- Preceded by: Joel Doolittle
- Succeeded by: Titus Hutchinson

Member of the Vermont House of Representatives from the Montpelier district
- In office 1824–1825
- Preceded by: Araunah Waterman
- Succeeded by: William Upham

Personal details
- Born: Samuel Prentiss; March 31, 1782 Stonington, Connecticut
- Died: January 15, 1857 (aged 74) Montpelier, Vermont
- Resting place: Green Mount Cemetery; Montpelier, Vermont
- Party: Federalist; National Republican; Whig
- Spouse: Lucretia Houghton (m. 1804; died 1855)
- Children: 12 (including Theodore Prentiss)
- Relatives: John Holmes Prentiss (brother); William A. Prentiss (brother)
- Profession: Attorney

Samuel Prentiss (March 31, 1782 – January 15, 1857) was an associate justice and chief justice of the Vermont Supreme Court, a United States senator from Vermont and a United States district judge of the United States District Court for the District of Vermont.

== Education and career ==
Born on March 31, 1782, in Stonington, Connecticut, Prentiss moved with his family to Worcester, Massachusetts, and then to Northfield, Massachusetts, in 1786, where he completed preparatory studies and was instructed in the classics by private tutor Reverend Samuel C. Allen. He studied law in Northfield with attorney Samuel Vose, and in Brattleboro, Vermont, with attorney John W. Blake in 1802. He was admitted to the bar in 1803 and practiced in Montpelier, Vermont until 1824.

Prentiss was a member of the Vermont House of Representatives from 1824 to 1825. He was an associate justice of the Vermont Supreme Court from 1825 to 1829, and chief justice from 1829 to 1830.

=== Political affiliations and unsuccessful candidacy ===
In addition to practicing law, Prentiss became active in politics, first as a Federalist, and later as a National Republican and Whig. He was an unsuccessful candidate for the United States House of Representatives in 1816.

== Congressional service ==
Prentiss was elected in 1831 to the United States Senate as a National Republican. He was reelected as a Whig in 1837 and served from March 4, 1831, to April 11, 1842, when he resigned to accept a judicial appointment. He was Chairman of the Committee on Patents and the Patent Office for the 27th United States Congress.

=== Anti-dueling statute ===
While in the Senate, Prentiss was the originator and successful advocate of the law to suppress dueling in the District of Columbia.

== Federal judicial service ==
Prentiss was nominated by President John Tyler on April 8, 1842, to a seat on the United States District Court for the District of Vermont vacated by Judge Elijah Paine. He was confirmed by the United States Senate on April 8, 1842, and received his commission the same day. His service terminated on January 15, 1857, due to his death in Montpelier. He was interred at Green Mount Cemetery in Montpelier.

== Family ==
The second of nine children born to Dr. Samuel Prentiss III and his wife Lucretia (née Holmes), Prentiss was the fourth in his line to be named Samuel Prentiss. Two of his younger brothers also had notable political careers. John Holmes Prentiss served two terms as a U.S. congressman from New York. William A. Prentiss served in the Vermont House of Representatives, was the 10th mayor of Milwaukee, Wisconsin, and a member of the Wisconsin State Assembly.

Dr. Samuel Prentiss III was a prominent physician and served as a combat surgeon for his father, Colonel Samuel Prentice II, during the American Revolutionary War. The Prentiss family were descendants from Captain Thomas Prentice, who emigrated from England to the Massachusetts Bay Colony in the 1640s and served as a captain during King Philip's War.

In 1804, Samuel Prentiss IV married Lucretia Houghton (1786–1855) of Northfield. They had twelve children, though at least two died in infancy. Their eighth child, Theodore Prentiss, moved to Wisconsin, where he served as the first mayor of Watertown, Wisconsin, and in the Wisconsin State Assembly.

== Notable law student ==
Among the lawyers who received their education and training in Prentiss's office was William Upham, who later served in the United States Senate.

== Other service and honors ==
Prentiss was a trustee of Dartmouth College from 1820 to 1827; he received the honorary degrees of Artium Magister and Legum Doctor from Dartmouth in 1817 and 1832.

== Sources ==
=== Books ===
- American Historical Association (1903). Annual Report of the American Historical Association. Vol. I. Washington, DC: US Government Printing Office.
- Bisbee, Marvin Davis (1900). General Catalogue of Dartmouth College and the Associated Schools 1769–1900. Hanover, NH: Dartmouth College. p. 67.
- Dolliver, Louise Pearsons (1907). Lineage Book - National Society of the Daughters of the American Revolution. Vol. XXIII. Harrisburg, PA: Telegraph Printing Company.
- Hemenway, Abby Maria (1882). The History of the Town of Montpelier, Including that of the Town of East Montpelier. Montpelier, VT: A. M. Hemenway. p. 447.
- Thompson, Zadock (1842). History of Vermont, Natural, Civil and Statistical. Burlington, VT: Chauncey Goodrich. p. 124.
- Biographical Directory of the United States Congress, 1774-2005. Washington, DC: US Government Printing Office. 2005. ISBN 978-0-16-073176-1.

=== Internet ===
- "Prominent People Buried in Vermont: Samuel Prentiss". www.voca58.org. Burlington, VT: Vermont Old Cemetery Association.
- Vermont State Archives and Records Administration. "Vermont Election Results: United States Representative (Six Districts), 1812–1820" (PDF). www.sec.state.vt.us/. Montpelier, VT: Vermont Secretary of State. Archived from the original (PDF) on September 12, 2015.

U.S. Senate
Preceded by Dudley Chase	U.S. senator (Class 3) from Vermont; 1831–1842; Served alongside: Horatio Seymour, Benjamin Swift and Samuel S. Phelps	Succeeded by Samuel C. Crafts
Legal offices
Preceded by Joel Doolittle	Associate Justice of the Vermont Supreme Court; 1825–1829	Succeeded by Titus Hutchinson
Preceded by Richard Skinner	Chief Justice of the Vermont Supreme Court; 1829–1830	Succeeded by Titus Hutchinson
Preceded by Elijah Paine	United States district judge for the District of Vermont; 1842–1857	Succeeded by David Allen Smalley
