= John Holmes Prentiss =

19th-century American politician

John H. Prentiss
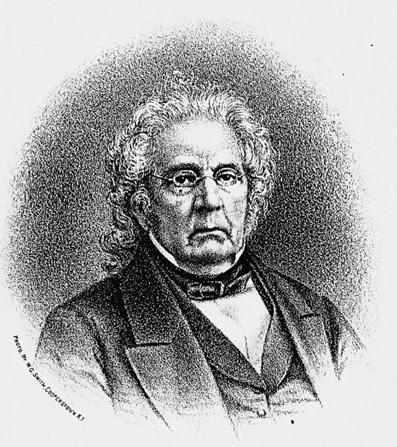

Member of the U.S. House of Representatives from New York's 19th district
- In office March 4, 1837 – March 3, 1841
- Preceded by: Sherman Page
- Succeeded by: Samuel S. Bowne

Personal details
- Born: John Holmes Prentiss; April 17, 1784 Worcester, Massachusetts, U.S.
- Died: June 26, 1861 (aged 77) Cooperstown, New York, U.S.
- Resting place: Lakewood Cemetery, Cooperstown, New York
- Party: Democratic
- Spouses: Catherine Cox Morris (m. 1815; died 1818); Urilla Shankland (m. 1828–1861)
- Children: with Catherine Morris; Mary Martha (Strong)^{(b. 1817; died 1854)}; Catharine Lucretia (Dodge)^{(b. 1817; died 1901)}; with Urilla Shankland; Alexander Shankland Prentiss^{(b. 1829; died 1854)}; John Holmes Prentiss Jr.^{(b. 1832; died 1923)}; Rachel Ann Prentiss^{(b. 1834; died 1874)}; Charlotte Darbyshire (Browning)^{(b. 1837; died 1935)}
- Relatives: Samuel Prentiss (brother); William A. Prentiss (brother); Theodore Prentiss (nephew)

Military service
- Allegiance: United States
- Branch/service: New York Militia
- Rank: Colonel

John Holmes Prentiss (April 17, 1784 – June 26, 1861) was an American newspaper publisher and politician in the U.S. state of New York. He represented New York's 19th congressional district in the 25th and 26th U.S. Congresses from 1837 to 1841.

== Career ==
Born in Worcester, Massachusetts, he attended local and private schools. He completed an apprenticeship as a printer, and then went into the newspaper business.

=== Printing ===
Prentiss became foreman of the New York Evening Post before moving to Cooperstown, New York, in October 1808. He became the printer of The Impartial Observer, which had been founded by Judge William Cooper. In 1809, the paper's name was changed to The Cooperstown Federalist to reflect its political affiliation. When Cooper died Prentiss became the paper's owner and editor. In 1818, the name was changed to The Freeman's Journal dropping the Federalist label as Prentiss shifted his political support to the Democratic-Republican Party. He operated the newspaper until his retirement in 1849.

=== National Guard ===
In addition to operating the newspaper, Prentiss served in the New York Militia, appointed by Governor DeWitt Clinton as inspector of the 16th Division with the rank of colonel. He was postmaster of Cooperstown from April 24, 1833, to February 17, 1837, and was vice president of the 1837 New York State Democratic convention in Albany.

=== Congress ===
Prentiss was elected as the Twenty-fifth and Twenty-sixth Congresses as a Democrat, serving from March 4, 1837, to March 3, 1841. He was not a candidate for renomination in 1840 and returned to his newspaper, in addition serving as president of the Bank of Cooperstown.

== Death and burial ==
Prentiss retired in 1849 and continued to reside in Cooperstown. He died there on June 26, 1861, and was buried at Cooperstown's Lakewood Cemetery.

== Family ==
John Holmes Prentiss was the third of nine children born to Dr. Samuel Prentiss and his wife Lucretia (née Holmes). His older brother, Samuel Prentiss, was a chief justice of the Vermont Supreme Court, a United States senator, and a United States district judge. His younger brother, William A. Prentiss, was the 10th mayor of Milwaukee, Wisconsin, and served in the Vermont House of Representatives and the Wisconsin State Assembly. Samuel Prentiss' son, Theodore Prentiss, became the first mayor of Watertown, Wisconsin, and also served in the Wisconsin State Assembly.

Their father, Dr. Samuel Prentiss was a prominent physician and served as a combat surgeon for his father, Colonel Samuel Prentice, during the American Revolutionary War. The Prentiss family were descendants of Captain Thomas Prentice, who emigrated from England to the Massachusetts Bay Colony in the 1640s and served as a captain during King Philip's War.

In 1815 Prentiss married Catherine Cox Morris (1795–1818), the daughter of General Jacob Morris and granddaughter of Lewis Morris. In 1828 he married Urilla Shankland (1799–1890). His children with his first wife included Mary Martha (1817–1854) and Catharine Lucretia (1817–1901). With his second wife his children included Alexander Shankland (1829–1854), John Holmes Jr. (1832–1923), Rachel Ann (1834–1874), and Charlotte Darbyshire (1837–1935).

U.S. House of Representatives
| Preceded by Sherman Page | Member of the U.S. House of Representatives from New York's 19th congressional district March 4, 1837 – March 3, 1841 | Succeeded by Samuel S. Bowne |
