= Prentice (surname) =

Prentice is a surname, and may refer to:

- Adam Prentice (born 1997), American football player
- Alex Prentice, Scottish barrister
- Alex Prentice (footballer) (1879–1914), Australian rules footballer
- Alison Prentice (1934–2021), Canadian historian
- Alta Rockefeller Prentice (1871–1962), American philanthropist and activist
- Andrew Prentice, Australian mathematician
- A. N. Prentice (Andrew Noble Prentice)), (1866–1941), British architect
- Ann Prentice (born 1952), British nutritionist
- Archibald Prentice (1792–1857), Scottish journalist
- Beatrice Prentice (1884–1977), American stage actress
- Bernadeth Prentice (born 1969), Saint Kitts and Nevis athlete
- Bill Prentice (born 1950), Canadian ice hockey player
- Bobby Prentice (1953–2019), Scottish footballer
- Bridget Prentice (born 1952), Scottish politician
- Chris Prentice (born 1953), British Luger in the winter Olympics
- Christopher Prentice (born 1954), British diplomat
- Clarrie Prentice (1891–1948), Australian rugby union and rugby league footballer
- Colin Prentice (born 1952), British ecologist
- David Prentice (1936–2014), English artist
- David Prentice (footballer) (1908–1984), Scottish footballer
- David R. Prentice (1943–2024), American artist
- Dean Prentice (1932–2019), Canadian ice hockey player
- Deborah Prentice (born 1961), American psychologist and university administrator
- Derek Prentice (born 1950), British luger
- Dinah Prentice (born 1935), British artist
- Dixon Prentice (1919–2014), American judge
- Doug Prentice (1898–1962), English rugby union footballer and administrator
- Eddy Prentice (1920–2009), New Zealand cricketer
- Eric Prentice (1926–2002), Canadian ice hockey player
- Ezra P. Prentice (1877–1966), American lawyer and politician from New York
- Francis Prentice (1912–1978), English cricketer
- Frank Winnold Prentice (1889–1982), British merchant seaman and Titanic survivor
- Fynn Hudson-Prentice (born 1996), English cricketer
- George Prentice (1871–1948), Scottish minister and missionary in Nyasaland
- George D. Prentice (1802–1870), American newspaper editor
- George Gray Prentice (1891–1944), Australian architect
- Gordon Prentice (born 1951), British politician
- Herbert Prentice (1890–1963), British theatre producer and director
- Ian Prentice (born 1948), Australian politician from Queensland
- Jed Prentice (born 1968), American slalom canoeist
- James D. Prentice (1899–1979), Canadian naval officer
- James Douglas Prentice (1861–1911), Scottish rancher and political figure in British Columbia
- Jane Prentice (born 1953), Australian politician
- Jessica Prentice (21st century), American chef
- Jim Prentice (1956–2016), Canadian politician
- Jim Prentice (footballer) (1949–2010), Australian rules footballer
- Jim Prentice (game designer) (1909–2005), American game designer and businessman
- Jimmy Prentice (1885–1915), Scottish amateur golfer
- Jo Ann Prentice (1933–2025), American golfer
- Joan Prentice (died 1589), Englishwoman executed after being accused of witchcraft
- John Prentice (businessman) (1847–1925), Scottish engineer and business executive.
- John Prentice (footballer, born 1898) (1898–1966), Scottish footballer
- John Prentice (cartoonist) (1920–1999), American cartoonist
- John Prentice (footballer, born 1926) (1926–2006), Scottish football player and manager
- John Rockefeller Prentice (1902–1972), United States Army officer and lawyer, son of Alta Rockefeller Prentice
- Jordan Prentice (born 1973), Canadian dwarf actor
- Judson Prentice (1810–1886), American politician from Wisconsin
- Justin Prentice (born 1994), American actor
- Keith Prentice (1940–1992), American soap opera actor
- Kobe Prentice (born 2004), American football player
- Leslie Prentice (1886–1928), Australian-born English cricketer
- Levi Wells Prentice (1851–1935), American still life and landscape painter
- Margarita Prentice (1931–2019), American politician from Washington State
- Matt Prentice (born 1980), New Zealand tennis player
- Miles Prentice (born 1942), American businessman and civic leader
- Mitchell Prentice (born 1983), Australian soccer player
- Reg Prentice (1923–2001), British politician
- Robert Prentice (1917–1987), Australian long-distance runner
- Ross Prentice (born 1946), Canadian statistician
- Samuel O. Prentice (1850–1924), American lawyer and judge
- Stan Prentice (1903–1982), New Zealand rugby league footballer
- Suzanne Prentice (born 1958), New Zealand country singer and politician
- Tara Prentice (born 1997), American water polo player
- Tim Prentice (designer) (born c.1964), American industrial designer
- Tim Prentice (sculptor) (1930–2025), American kinetic sculptor
- Travis Prentice (born 1976), American football player
- Una Prentice (1913–1986), Australian lawyer
- Ward Prentice (1886–1969), Australian rugby union and rugby league footballer and cricketer
- William Prentice (1919–2004), Australian judge in Papua New Guinea
- Winifred Prentice (1910–2007), British matron and nurse leader
- Wolfgang Prentice (born 2000), American soccer player

== See also ==
- Prentis
- Prentiss (surname)
