= Broadnax =

Broadnax is a surname. Notable people with the surname include:

- Donald Broadnax (born 1961), American serial killer on Alabama's death row
- Horace Broadnax (born 1964), the head men's basketball coach at Savannah State University
- Jamie Broadnax (born 1980), American film critic, podcaster, writer
- Jerry Broadnax (born 1951), American professional footballer
- Johnny Broadnax (1904–1986), American college football player and coach
- Lydia Broadnax (1742–1820), American free Black woman, businesswoman, former slave
- Morris Broadnax (1931–2009), Motown songwriter
- Robert Broadnax Glenn (1854–1920), Democratic governor of the U.S. state of North Carolina 1905–1909
- Rodriquez Broadnax (born 1994), stage name Jacquees, American singer and songwriter
- T. C. Broadnax, American city manager of Austin, Texas, previously of Dallas and Tacoma, Washington
- Walter Broadnax (1944–2022), American educator
- Willmer "Little Ax" Broadnax, (1916–1994), African-American hard gospel quartet singer/songwriter

== See also ==
- Robert Broadnax Glenn (1854–1920), American lawyer, prosecuting attorney, U.S. Attorney, politician
