= Thomas Wythe =

Thomas Wythe may refer to:

- Thomas Wythe (cricketer) (1814–1854), English cricketer
- Thomas Wythe Sr. (c. 1630–c. 1694), immigrant to the Virginia colony, member of the Virginia House of Burgesses
- Thomas Wythe Jr. (1690–1729), his grandson, member of the Virginia House of Burgesses
