= Wythe (disambiguation) =

A wythe is a continuous vertical section of masonry.

Wythe may also refer to:

- George Wythe, law professor and Declaration of Independence signer
- Wythe County, Virginia, a county named for him
- Wythe (Hampton, Virginia), a neighborhood
