= Thomas Wythe Jr. =

Virginia burgess

Thomas Wythe

Member of the Virginia House of Burgesses from Elizabeth City County
- In office 1723-1726 Serving with Robert Armistead
- Preceded by: Anthony Armistead
- Succeeded by: Hollier
- In office 1718 Serving with Henry Jenkins
- Preceded by: William Armistead
- Succeeded by: Anthony Armistead

Personal details
- Born: 1690 Elizabeth City County, Virginia
- Died: 1729 (aged 38–39) Elizabeth City County, Virginia
- Spouse: Margaret Walker
- Children: 2 sons including George Wythe, 2 daughters
- Occupation: farmer, politician

Thomas Wythe (1690–1729) was the grandson of immigrant and one term burgess Thomas Wythe Sr. (1630–1693) and himself represented his native Elizabeth City County during two sessions of the House of Burgesses. Born to Ann Sheppard and her husband Thomas Wythe II (1670–1694). He married Margaret Walker, the granddaughter of Rev. George Keith, in 1719 and had 2 sons and two daughters, of whom George Wythe (1726–1806) would become the longest-lived as well as most famous, inheriting the family plantation on Back River, but ultimately became a successful lawyer, legislator and judge who moved to Richmond, Virginia.
