= George Sweeney Trial =

1806 trial in Virginia, U.S.

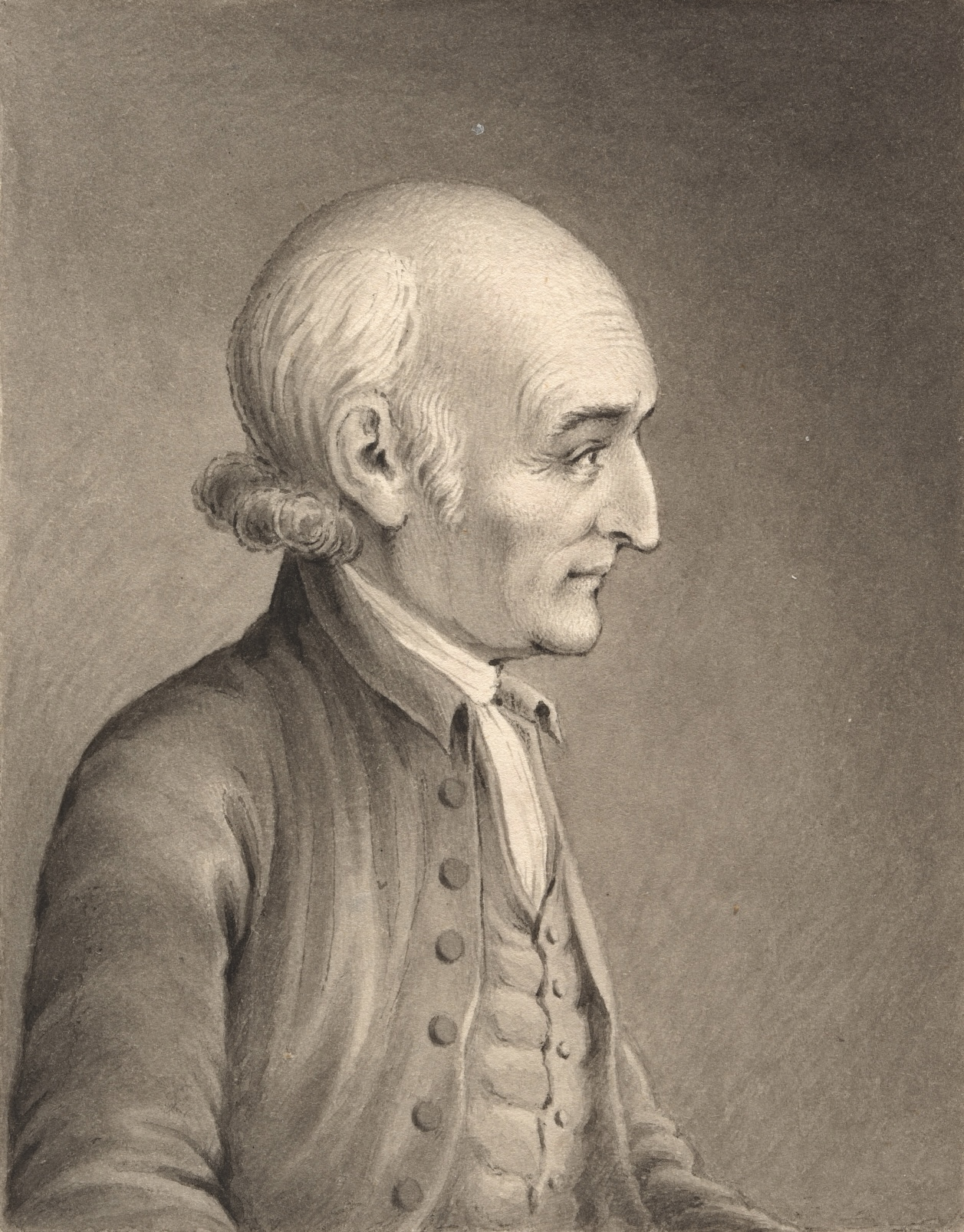
George Wythe, victim

The George Sweeney Trial in 1806 in Richmond, Virginia was a trial in which George Sweeney, the grand-nephew of George Wythe, one of the Founding Fathers of the United States, was acquitted of murdering Wythe. Wythe was a distinguished attorney who attended the Philadelphia Convention in 1775 and signed the Declaration of Independence in 1776; in 1806, he died of arsenic poisoning. Before he died, Wythe accused his nephew of murder and changed his will to exclude him. Wythe's black housekeeper provided evidence that George Sweeney had tried to poison Wythe, her son and her, but by law was prohibited from testifying in a criminal case against a White man. Sweeney was tried and found not guilty. The case is used as an example of how racism in early American law resulted in an acquittal.

== Circumstances ==
Although George Wythe was 79 years old, he was healthy and vigorous. Since his only child had died as an infant decades before, Wythe in 1803 or earlier wrote a will leaving a large amount to George Sweeney, his sister's grandson named after him. When Sweeney, a 17-year-old drinker and gambler, came to live with Wythe in 1805, he began stealing Wythe's books for sale and forging Wythe's name on personal bank account checks to help pay his debts. Wythe had also made settlements for former slaves Lydia Broadnax, whom he had freed in 1787, and her 16-year-old son Michael Brown, as well as Benjamin, an adult man whom he freed in 1797. Sweeney would share his inheritance with them.

Since Sweeney feared that Wythe would discover the forgeries, and knew that he was a beneficiary of Wythe's estate, evidence suggests that he decided to murder his uncle and/or the other heirs. A shopkeeper later attested that he sold Sweeney arsenic, and Broadnax said she saw him put something in the coffeepot in the kitchen from which Wythe, Broadnax and Brown drank that Sunday morning, May 25. Brown and Wythe died slow and agonizing deaths over several days: Brown on June 1 and Wythe a week later on June 8, 1806. Broadnax survived.

As Wythe lay on his death bed, Sweeney's forgeries were discovered. On June 1, the judge changed his will to disinherit his grandnephew.

== Trial ==
On June 18, Sweeney was arrested and charged with murder. The trial began on September 2. the Convincing testimony pointing to Sweeney as the culprit was provided by Broadnax, who had been Wythe's cook for many years. She had witnessed Sweeney's suspicious behaviors around the coffee pot, which suggested that he had placed a substance in the coffee on May 25, while she was in the kitchen with him. Broadnax had drunk a small amount of the coffee and become ill. When Wythe and Brown also became ill from drinking the coffee, she testified that she suspected that Sweeney had put something in it.

The two judges did not allow Broadnax's testimony into evidence nor that of the other black servants who had seen Sweeney's suspicious behaviors. They adhered to the law at that time, which did not allow blacks to testify against a white person in a criminal trial: "It was gleaned from negroes, which is not permitted by our laws to go against a white man."

Hearsay evidence was introduced by the whites who testified that Sweeney had bought arsenic. The jail warden testified that Sweeney had not been searched upon arrest, and that later a packet with arsenic was found in the jail yard, where it could have been thrown from a jail window. Another person testified that Wythe, on his death bed, asked him to search Sweeney's room, where he found a container of arsenic. Wythe changed his will on June 1, to disinherit Sweeney. Because hearsay evidence was excluded by law, the jury's verdict on September 8 was not guilty.

== Bibliography ==
- Bruce Chadwick (2009). I Am Murdered: George Wythe, Thomas Jefferson, and the Killing That Shocked a New Nation. Wiley. ISBN 1620455579.
- Steve Henkel, "Murder in the Family," The American Genealogist, 78 (2003): 87-88.
