= Taliaferro =

Taliaferro Talliaferro, Tagliaferro, Talifero, Taliafero, Taliferro, Tellifero, Tolliver, Toliver
- Anglo-Italian FFV
- Coat of arms as represented in a sketch sent from Thomas Jefferson to George Wythe, 1786.
- Current region: United States (Virginia and Maryland)
- Etymology: Tagliaferro (Italian): (lit. 'Iron Cutter')
- Origin: Venice; London
- Founded: c. 1560s
- Founder: Bartholomew Taliaferro

The Taliaferro family (/ˈtɒlɪvər/ TOL-iv-ər), also spelled Talliaferro, Tagliaferro, Talifero, Taliafero, Taliferro or Tellifero and sometimes fully anglicised to Tolliver or Toliver, is a prominent American family of Anglo-Italian descent in eastern Virginia and Maryland. The Taliaferros (originally Tagliaferro [taʎʎaˈfɛrro], which means 'Ironcutter' in Italian) are one of the early families who settled in Virginia in the 17th century. They migrated from London, where an ancestor had served as a musician in the court of Queen Elizabeth I. The surname in that line is believed to trace back to Bartholomew Taliaferro, a native of Venice and subject of the Doge of Venice, who settled in London and was made a denizen in 1562.

The origins of the Taliaferro name were of interest to George Wythe, a colonial Virginia lawyer and classical scholar, who had married Elizabeth Taliaferro, the daughter of architect Richard Taliaferro. Wythe urged his former student and friend Thomas Jefferson to investigate the name when Jefferson traveled to Italy. Jefferson later reported to Wythe that he had found two families of the name in Tuscany, and that the family was of Italian origin. Jefferson enclosed his sketch of the coat of arms of the Tagliaferro family as reported to him by a friend in Florence in 1786; shortly thereafter an engraved copperplate of the family arms was transported across the Atlantic and kept at the Wythe House, a historic landmark home built by Richard Taliaferro in Colonial Williamsburg in 1754.

== Etymology ==
Unknown to Jefferson, Taliaferro appears to arise due to a transcription error and a variation of the Italian surname Tagliaferro, which is, even today, widespread in Italy especially in Lombardy, but it also has representation in the Bolognese, Florentine, and Lazio regions. The name Tagliaferro, less common, has families in Vicenza, Gorizia, in the province of Rome and in Campania. A slight variation, Tagliafierro, is also typical of the Campania region, Caserta in particular.

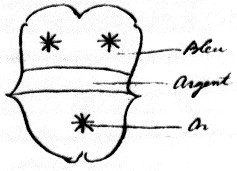
Arms of Tagliaferro family of Tuscany. Sketch sent from Thomas Jefferson to George Wythe, 1786

From the etymological point of view, the term tagliaferro indicates a soldier skilled in piercing the opponent or the shield of the adversary with his weapons, which cleave/slice medieval armor, such as with a stroke of ax or sword. In reality, these surnames may also derive from the medieval name Tagliaferro, that is, the Italianization of the French name Taillefer, made famous by the chivalric epic (the name Tagliaferro, on the other hand, is also mentioned in the eighteenth-century opera La Cecchina, by Niccolò Piccinni).

== People with the name ==
=== Given name ===
It is the first name of the following persons:

- Taliaferro Ware Avery, American film and television character actor
- Taliaferro Clark, a doctor during the Tuskegee Syphilis Study
- Toliver Craig, Jr., representative in the Kentucky General Assembly
- Toliver Craig, Sr. (first called Taliaferro Craig), 18th-century frontiersman and militia officer
- Taliaferro Preston Shaffner, 19th-century self-proclaimed colonel, inventor and publisher

=== Middle name ===
It is the middle name of the following persons:

- William Close (William Taliaferro Close), late surgeon who worked in Africa, father of actress Glenn Close
- Thomas T. Goldsmith (Thomas Toliver Goldsmith, Jr.), American physics professor and inventor
- Robert M. T. Hunter (Robert Mercer Taliaferro Hunter), U.S. Senator and Confederate Secretary of State
- Booker T. Jones (Booker Taliaferro Jones, Jr.), musician, composer, frontman for Booker T. and the MGs
- Sam Rayburn (Samuel Taliaferro Rayburn), 20th-century Speaker of the U.S. House of Representatives
- John T. Thompson (John Taliaferro Thompson), early 20th-century U.S. Army officer who invented Thompson submachine gun
- George T. Ward, (George Taliaferro Ward), planter and politician from Florida and a colonel in the Confederate army during the American Civil War
- Booker T. Washington (Booker Taliaferro Washington), postbellum African-American political leader, educator, orator, author, and ex-slave

=== Surname ===
It is the surname of the following persons:

==== Taliaferro ====
- Adam Taliaferro, American politician and former football player
- Al Taliaferro, Disney artist known for his Donald Duck comic strips
- Benjamin Taliaferro, early 19th-century U.S. Representative from Georgia
- Charles Taliaferro, philosopher
- Chris Taliaferro, Chicago alderman
- Edith Taliaferro, actress
- Edwin Taliaferro, later renaming himself Chokwe Lumumba, attorney and activist
- George Taliaferro, American football player, first black NFL draftee
- Gabriëlle Andrée Iglesias Velayos y Taliaferro, garden designer and landscape architect
- Hardin E. Taliaferro, humorist and Baptist preacher
- James G. Taliaferro, 19th-century lawyer, newspaper publisher, and judge in Louisiana
- James P. Taliaferro, early 20th-century U.S. Senator from Florida
- John Taliaferro, antebellum U.S. Representative from Virginia
- Lawrence Taliaferro, United States frontier agent
- Lorenzo Taliaferro, former running back for the Baltimore Ravens
- Mabel Taliaferro, actress
- Myron (Mike) Taliaferro, AFL and NFL quarterback
- Ray Taliaferro, radio host
- Richard Taliaferro, colonial architect in Williamsburg, Virginia
- R. Catesby Taliaferro, philosopher and mathematician
- Walter R. Taliaferro, pioneer U.S. Army aviator
- William B. Taliaferro, Confederate States of America general

==== Tolliver/Toliver ====
- Alexander Tolliver, American vaudeville performer and promoter
- Anthony Tolliver, basketball player
- Billy Joe Tolliver, football player
- Charles Tolliver, musician and composer
- David Tolliver, singer/songwriter/producer
- Don Toliver, American rapper
- Melba Tolliver, journalist
- Mose Tolliver, primitive artist

== Places ==
- Camp Taliaferro, San Diego, CA, Named for US Army pilot Walter R. Taliaferro
- Camp Taliaferro, Texas, United States, named for Walter R. Taliaferro
- T. C. Taliaferro House, Florida, United States
- Taliaferro County, Georgia, United States, named for Benjamin Taliaferro
- Willis Hall, formerly known as Taliaferro Hall, College of William and Mary, Virginia, United States
- Taliaferro Hall, University of Maryland, College Park, Maryland, United States, Named for Thomas Hardy Taliaferro. Dean/College of Engineering; Dean/College of Arts and Sciences

== Fictional characters ==
=== Tulliver ===
- Maggie Tulliver, in George Eliot's classic novel, The Mill on the Floss, a dark-complexioned miller's daughter

=== Tagliaferro ===
- Roy Tagliaferro, an alias of the serial killer Red John, in The Mentalist

=== Taliaferro ===
- Paul Taliaferro, a character in David Weber and Steve White's science-fiction novel The Shiva Option (2002)
- Peachey Taliaferro Carnehan, a military adventurer in Rudyard Kipling's short story "The Man Who Would Be King" (1888)
- Penelope Taliaferro Russell, secretary to John Joseph Bonforte in Robert A. Heinlein's Double Star (1956)
  - In another Heinlein novel, The Cat Who Walks Through Walls (1985), a character recites the purported etymology of the names Taliaferro and Tolliver.
- Roderick Taliaferro, the title character in George Cram Cook's first novel, Roderick Taliaferro: A Story of Maximilian's Empire (1903)

=== Tolliver ===
- Tolliver Groat, the postmaster of Ankh-Morpork in Terry Pratchett's Discworld
- Tolliver Lang, the stepbrother of the protagonist of The Harper Connelly Mysteries
- Ben Tolliver, a recurring character in the Gunsmoke radio and television series and the protagonist of the episode, "Ben Tolliver's Stud" (ep. 206×11 on television and ep. 166(46) on radio)
- Crane Tolliver, a character played by Wiley Harker on the ABC soap opera General Hospital
- Cy Tolliver, a character played by Powers Boothe on HBO's Deadwood TV series
- Jeffrey Tolliver, a recurring character in crime writer Karin Slaughter's Grant County series
- Lorenzo "Guts" Tolliver, protagonist of Jabari Asim's novel Only the Strong (May 12, 2015)
- Michael Tolliver, a gardener, who is a recurring character in Armistead Maupin's Tales of the City series
- Morton Tolliver, a character in Christopher Kenworthy's Dead or Alive: A Wild West Omnibus novel, of the Western Adventure Omnibus
- Pendleton Tolliver, a fictional character in Ted Bell's short story "The Powder Monkey", compiled in the anthology Thriller: Stories to Keep You Up All Night
- Steven Tolliver, owner of a sailing ship line in Cecil B. DeMille's film Reap the Wild Wind (1942)
- Toby Tolliver, a character in early 20th-century American theatrical tent shows
- Jim Tolliver, a Federal agent in Season 4 of the TV show Boardwalk Empire.
- Tollivers, a family in John Fox, Jr.'s romance/Western novel, The Trail of the Lonesome Pine (1908)

== See also ==
- First Families of Virginia
