= Tagliaferro =

Tagliaferro (pronounced [taʎʎaˈfɛrro], lit. 'Iron Cutter') is an Italian occupational surname which is most prevalent in the regions of Veneto, Piedmont and Lombardy and is also to be found among the Argentine, Brazilian, Venezuelan and (predominantly in its spelling variant Taliaferro) the American Italian diaspora. The name is related to the French name Taillefer with similar derivation.

Notable people with the surname include:

- Al Taliaferro (originally Tagliaferro; 1905–1969), American comics artist
- Magda Tagliaferro (1893–1986), Brazilian pianist
- Marta Tagliaferro (born 1989), Italian track and road racing cyclist

== Fictional character ==
- Roy Tagliaferro, alias of Red John, a fictional serial killer

== See also ==
- Monte Tagliaferro
- Tagliaferri
