= Powhatan (Five Forks, Virginia) =

Historic house in Virginia, United States

- U.S. National Register of Historic Places
- Virginia Landmarks Register
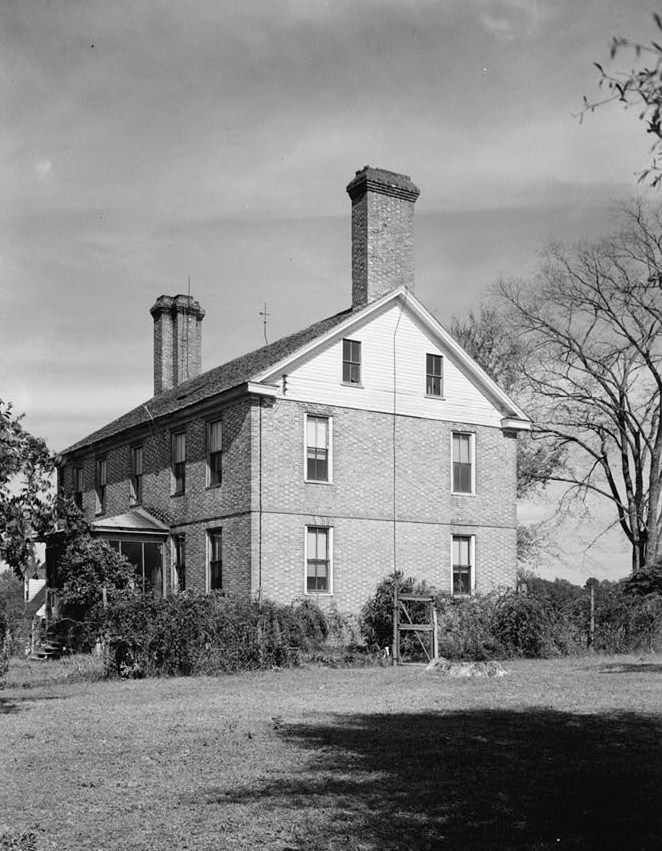
- Powhatan, HABS Photo

- Location within Virginia Location within the United States
- Location: N of jct. of Rtes. 615 and 5, near Five Forks, Virginia
- Coordinates: 37°15′47″N 76°46′08″W
- Area: 250 acres (100 ha)
- Built: c. 1750
- Architect: Taliaferro, Richard
- Architectural style: Georgian
- NRHP reference No.: 70000803
- VLR No.: 047-0016

Significant dates
- Added to NRHP: September 15, 1970
- Designated VLR: June 7, 1970

Powhatan is a historic home located near Five Forks, James City County, Virginia. The house was designed by its owner Richard Taliaferro (c. 1705–1779) and built about 1750. It is a two-story, five bay by two bay Georgian style brick dwelling. It has a hipped roof with dormers and features two massive interior end T-shaped chimneys. The house was gutted by fire during the American Civil War. It was thoroughly restored in 1948.

It was listed on the National Register of Historic Places in 1970.
