= Wythe (Hampton, Virginia) =

Historic neighborhood in Hampton, Virginia, USA

Coordinates: 37°0′11.6″N 76°22′39.8″W

Wythe is a neighborhood in Hampton, Virginia, along the water's edge of Hampton Roads, at the end of Virginia's Lower Peninsula. It is named after one of the signers of the United States Declaration of Independence, George Wythe. The oldest historic portion of the Wythe neighborhood became known as Olde Wythe and is on the National Register of Historic Places.

When it was developed in the first half of the 20th century, Wythe was part of rural Elizabeth City County, one of the first eight colonial Virginia counties, the county seat was Hampton. Settled in 1610, Hampton is the oldest continuously inhabited English-speaking city in the United States. In 1952, all of Elizabeth City County merged with Hampton.

== Wythe District ==
The name "Wythe" was first applied to a portion of Elizabeth City County after the Civil War when the Virginia Constitution of 1869 required counties to be divided into townships, rather than districts as formerly. Elizabeth City's three townships were named Wythe, Chesapeake, and Southfield. The Wythe Township was the western portion of the county and included George Wythe's birthplace, Chesterville, on the Northwest Branch of Back River. In 1874 Virginia replaced townships with magisterial districts requiring at least three in each county. The term "magisterial district" was later shortened to "district." Elizabeth City was one of Virginia's smallest counties thus when it became legal to do so the number of districts was reduced from three to two. The Southfield district was eliminated, leaving Wythe and Chesapeake. All of the county west of King Street outside the town of Hampton was the Wythe district. The Hampton Police Department still divides the city into two patrol districts named Wythe and Chesapeake. "Wythe Sector" includes all of the city west of La Salle Avenue.

== Wythe Neighborhood ==
In the first half of the twentieth-century "Wythe" came to refer to only the southern portion of the Wythe District, which because of its proximity to Newport News, gradually became the most populated portion of Wythe District. The George Wythe Elementary School opened here at the corner of Clairmont Ave. and Kecoughtan Road in 1909. In the 1930s the Wythe Shopping Center and Wythe Place and Wythe Crescent subdivisions were developed about a half mile east toward Hampton on Kecoughtan Road. It was in this period that Wythe came to refer specifically to the neighborhood along Kecoughtan Road east of the town of Kecoughtan (which was annexed into Newport News in 1927) and stretching westward toward LaSalle Avenue and Church Creek.

The Civil War Battle of the Ironclads happened right off Wythe's shores. Newport News railroads and shipyard and Hampton seafood industries and military installations fueled growth in the Lower Peninsula from 1880 through World War II. Residential development began in Wythe in the 20th century with the streetcar and continued through the social and business heyday of the 1950s. Today it is a neighborhood of charming architecture, lovely waterside views, and a promising future as new generations take up the challenge of preserving a rich heritage.

Wythe Presbyterian Church is the oldest congregation founded in Wythe and still remaining there. Many other including Aldersgate United Methodist, Wythe Parkway Baptist, and Emmanuel Lutheran Church have moved or closed. Their buildings are now used by other churches.

In 1993 the section of Wythe between Kecoughtan Road and Chesapeake Avenue. created a private neighborhood association called Olde Wythe. The Olde Wythe Historic District was added to the National Register of Historic Places in 2012.
