= Virginia Court of Chancery =

The Virginia Courts of Chancery were state courts with equity jurisdiction, which existed in Virginia from 1777 to 1875.

== High Court of Chancery ==
The Virginia General Assembly passed a law creating the High Court of Chancery during its October 1777 session. The Court met in the state capitol and was given jurisdiction over all equity cases for the entire state of Virginia, including those pending at the time in the General Court. The High Court of Chancery could hear cases brought before it by original process or appeals from a lower court. Its decisions could be appealed to the Virginia Supreme Court of Appeals, and the High Court of Chancery could ask the General Court to give an opinion on a legal issue. On January 23, 1802, the General Assembly abolished the High Court of Chancery and replaced it with the Superior Courts of Chancery.

=== Chancellors of the High Court of Chancery ===
- John Blair Jr.: 1780-1788
- Robert Carter Nicholas, Sr.: 1779-1780
- Edmund Pendleton: 1777-1788
- George Wythe: 1777-1802

== Superior Courts of Chancery ==
The Superior Courts of Chancery were created in 1802 to handle chancery matters initially handled by the High Court of Chancery. The state was divided into three chancery districts and cases from the counties composing the district were tried in a fixed location within each district. The records were kept in that location. Five additional districts were created before the court was supplanted by local Circuit Superior Courts of Law and Chancery in 1875. This court was sometimes called District Court of Chancery.
