= Robert Pleasants =

American educator and abolitionist (1723–1801)

Robert Pleasants (1723–1801) was an American educator and abolitionist. He was born in Henrico County, Virginia and became a plantation owner and operator of Robert Pleasants & Co., a consignment tobacco exporting company.

== Emancipation efforts ==
His father, John Pleasants, also a Quaker and member of the Curles Neck Meeting, wrote a will asking his heirs to free over 500 slaves when they reached 30 years of age. Contacts with the anti-slavery advocate Anthony Benezet and what became the Pennsylvania Abolition Society in 1774, spurred their commitment to the abolitionist movement.

However, testamentary manumission provisions were illegal in Virginia when John Pleasants died in 1771. Robert Pleasants lobbied Virginia legislators to allow manumissions, and when such became legal in 1782, freed his slaves, then hired them as paid laborers and provided for their education.

Robert Pleasants also hired John Marshall and initiated Pleasants v Pleasants as executor of his father's will and on behalf of the slaves that his siblings failed to free despite the will's provision. They won before Chancellor George Wythe, but his ruling was greatly restricted by the Court of Appeals led by Edmund Pendleton. Pleasants ended up giving about 78 former slaves over 350 acres of land, and by 1801 founded the Gravelly Hill School, the first educational institution for free blacks in Virginia. The Civil War Battle of Glendale was fought on the property, part of which was eventually rebuilt as the Gravel Hill Baptist Church.

Robert Pleasants was also one of the founders of the short-lived Virginia Abolition Society, and served as its president in 1790. The society disbanded after Virginia passed a law in 1798 forbidding abolitionists from sitting on juries in freedom suit cases.

Meanwhile, Pleasants submitted numerous petitions to the Virginia state government and the U.S. Congress calling for the end of the slave trade. The most famous, from 1791, is now at the Library of Virginia. Many of Pleasants' letters to George Washington, Thomas Jefferson and Patrick Henry regarding the legality and morality of slavery still survive. Some of the founders replied to Pleasants, affirming their distaste for the "peculiar institution." The Swem Library at the College of William and Mary holds many of Pleasants' papers.
