= Gettysburg: The Tide Turns =

2025 book by Bruce Chadwick

Gettysburg: The Tide Turns, An Oral History
- Author: Bruce Chadwick
- Language: English
- Subject: Military history
- Genre: Nonfiction
- Publisher: Pegasus
- Publication date: 2025
- Publication place: United States
- Pages: 336
- ISBN: 9781639368259

Gettysburg: The Tide Turns, An Oral History is a 2025 nonfiction military history book by Bruce Chadwick. It was published by Pegasus.

== Overview ==
The book portrays the Battle of Gettysburg through a collection of primary sources such as diary entries, letters, and newspaper articles written by people who experienced it. It is written in the style of an oral history, although it mostly relies on written material.

== Reception ==
Publishers Weekly gave the book a positive review, praising its use of first-hand accounts to illustrate the "dramatic combination of pathos and absurdity" that characterized the Battle of Gettysburg. Kirkus Reviews praised its entertaining style of portraying events through the eyes of contemporaries, but noted that its portrayal of historical figures like Abraham Lincoln, Robert E. Lee and George Meade. BookBrowse wrote that it successfully combines "traditional historic narrative with the in-the-moment ethos of an oral history."
