= James Cocke =

American politician

Dr. James Cocke served as mayor of Williamsburg, Virginia from 1767 to 1768 and again from 1772 to 1773.

Preceded by Thomas Everard	Mayor of Williamsburg, Virginia; 1767–1768	Succeeded by George Wythe
Preceded by Thomas Everard	Mayor of Williamsburg, Virginia; 1772–1773	Succeeded by John Dixon
