= Old Wythe Historic District =

Historic district in Virginia, United States

- U.S. National Register of Historic Places
- U.S. Historic district
- Virginia Landmarks Register
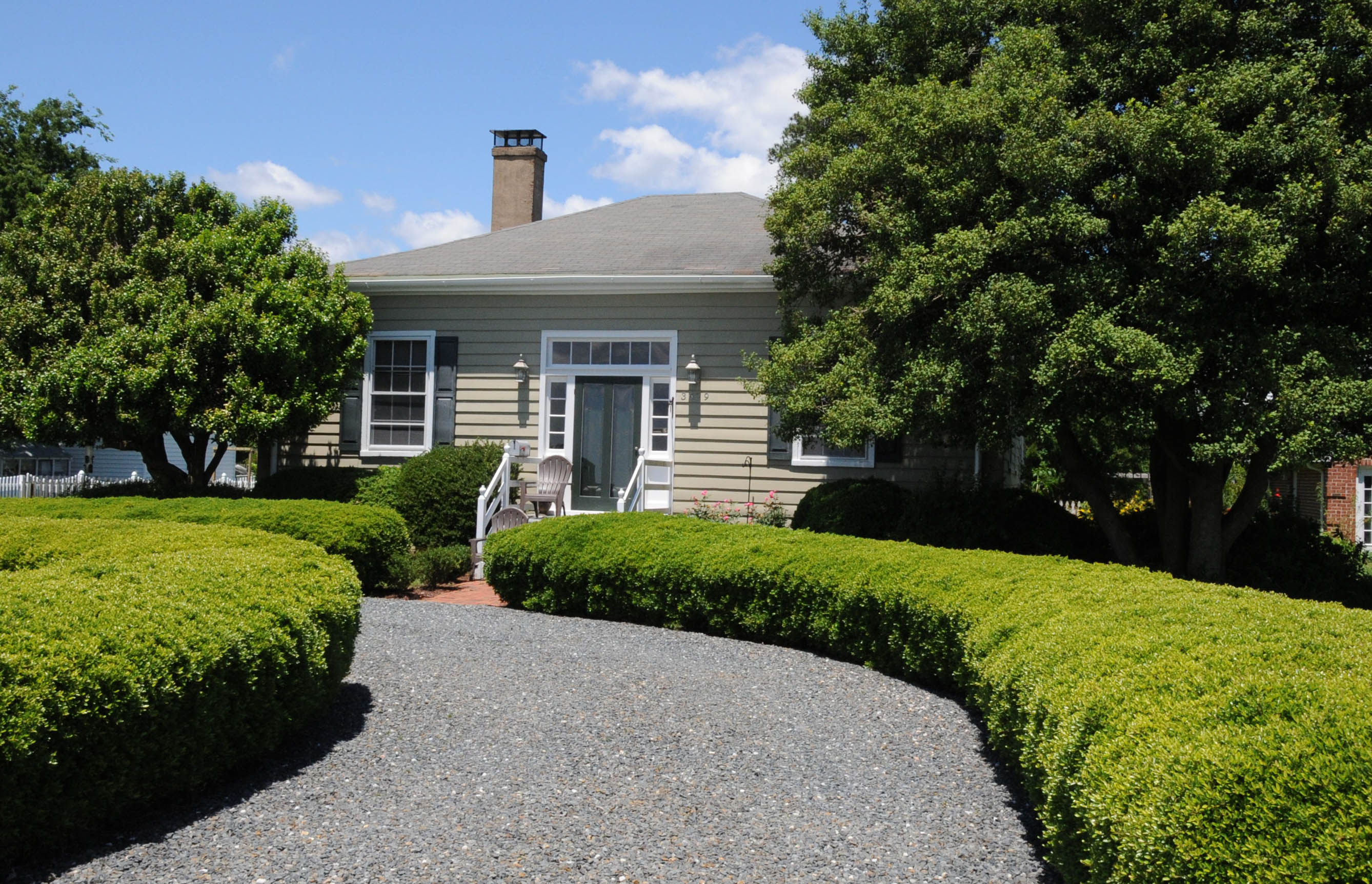
- The historic John Simpson house

- Location within Virginia Location within the United States
- Location: Roughly bounded by Hanover St., Pear Ave., Hampton Ave, & Kecoughtan Rd., Hampton, Virginia
- Coordinates: 37°00′13″N 76°22′40″W
- Area: 565 acres (229 ha)
- Built: 1891
- Architect: Multiple
- Architectural style: Greek Revival, Queen Anne, Colonial Revival, Tudor Revival, Mission/Spanish Revival
- NRHP reference No.: 12000905
- VLR No.: 114-5186

Significant dates
- Added to NRHP: October 31, 2012
- Designated VLR: September 18, 2008

Old Wythe Historic District is a national historic district located at Hampton, Virginia. The district encompasses 2,076 contributing buildings, 1 contributing site, and 1 contributing structure in a primarily residential area of Hampton. The residences include notable examples of the Greek Revival, Queen Anne, Colonial Revival, Tudor Revival, and Mission Revival styles.

It was listed on the National Register of Historic Places in 2012. The neighborhood association uses the spelling "Olde Wythe." This is followed on numerous local signs and historical makers.

== History ==
The Old Wythe Historic District is part of the larger Wythe neighborhood. It was named after George Wythe, a law professor and signer of the Declaration of Independence who was born within what is now the City of Hampton. The name was first applied to this portion of Elizabeth City County after the Civil War and is reflected on in the 1870 U.S. Census. All of Elizabeth City County later became part of the City of Hampton.

The district first developed in the 1880s, and is composed generally of six primary subdivisions with the last platted in the 1930s. The earliest building is the John Simpson House, built in 1849.

Suburban development in the district was spurred by the growth of two nearby cities, Hampton and Newport News. The district experienced a boom in development during and after World War I, with over half of the residences being built in the 1930s and 40s.
