= Tagliaferri =

Tagliaferri is an Italian surname, a plural or patronymic form of Tagliaferro (lit. 'iron cutter'). Notable people with the surname include:

- Ernesto Tagliaferri (1889–1937), Italian musician
- Frankie Tagliaferri (born 1999), American soccer player
- Guadalupe Tagliaferri (born 1974), Argentine politician
- John Tagliaferri (born 1964), American football retired player
- Liliana Tagliaferri (born 1928), Italian retired sprinter
- Mario Tagliaferri (1927–1999), Italian prelate
- Tommaso Tagliaferri (born 1982), Italian snowboarder
- Peter Tagliaferri (born 1960), Australian politician
- Ugo Tagliaferri, Italian amateur astronomer
