= Richard Taliaferro =

Colonial architect

Coat of Arms of Richard Taliaferro

Richard Taliaferro (/ˈtɒlɪvər/ TOL-iv-ər; c. 1705–1779) was a colonial architect and builder in Williamsburg, Virginia, in what is now the United States. Among his works is Wythe House, a Georgian-style building that was built in 1750 or 1755. It was declared a U.S. National Historic Landmark in 1970. Other works were public buildings, including the Governor's Palace, the Capitol, and the President's House at the College of William & Mary.

Richard Taliaferro was born about 1705 in England, the Taliaferros, who had settled in Virginia in the early 17th century from London. He lived most of his adult life at his plantation, Powhatan, in James City County outside Williamsburg. Taliaferro built the Wythe House in Williamsburg for his daughter, Elizabeth, and her husband, George Wythe. In his 1775 will, he gave them life tenancy in the house upon his death: "In the name of God Amen, I, Richard Taliaferro of the Parish and county of James City, being aged, but of sound mind and memory, do make my last will and testament as forth with. I give and desire my house and lotts in the city of Williamsburg situate on the west side of Palace Street, and on the North side of the Church yard, to my son-in-law Mr. George Wythe and his wife, my daughter Elizabeth during their lives. ...and I do hereby constitute and appoint my Son-in-law the said George Wythe and my said son Richard Taliaferro Executors of this my last will and testament, hereby revoking all former wills by me made."

Taliaferro died on 3 July 1779 at the age of 74 "with the gout in his head".
