= Thomas Everard (mayor) =

Mayor of Williamsburg, Virginia, from 1766 to 1767 (1719–1781)

- Born: 1719; Shadwell, London Borough of Tower Hamlets, England
- Died: 1781 (aged 61–62); Colonial Williamsburg, Virginia
- Occupations: Clerk at House of Burgesses, mayor of Williamsburg, commissioner of accounts
- Spouse: Diana Robinson

Thomas Everard (1719–1781) served as mayor of Williamsburg, Virginia from 1766 to 1767. He was a clerk at the House of Burgesses and lived in the Brush-Everard House in Colonial Williamsburg. He supported the fight for independence from the British Empire, including serving on the committee that selected delegates from Virginia for the Continental Congress.

Orphaned at the age of 10, he was admitted to Christ's Hospital, where he obtained an education. He then immigrated to Virginia, where he entered into an apprenticeship with Matthew Kemp. Upon the end of his apprenticeship, he obtained his first position as a clerk. He bought the house and property now called Brush-Everard House in Williamsburg and 1600 acres in western Virginia and at the edge of Williamsburg.

== Early life and education ==
Everard was born about 1719 in St. Paul's Parish, Shadwell, in the London Borough of Tower Hamlets. He was baptized in August 1719. His father, William, was a skinner by trade.

At the age of ten, he was admitted to Christ's Hospital, a school established for the children of the poor and homeless in London. There he was trained, along with all his fellow students, to read, write, and maintain accounts. The students were called Bluecoat Boys because of their uniforms. He completed his education.

After completing his education at Christ's Hospital, he was discharged in January 1735 to his uncle Edward Everard and Edward Athawes, a local merchant, who arranged for him to enter an apprenticeship in Colonial America. He then immigrated to the Colony of Virginia in 1735, where he was an apprentice to Matthew Kemp. Kemp was a clerk of James City court and the Secretary's office. He was also an alderman, justice of the peace, and a Representative of Middlesex County, Virginia. Everard was an apprentice for six years at the Secretary's office, the first four of which were under Matthew Kemp, who died in 1739.

== Career ==
Everard served in many other public offices, including being clerk of the York County court, the General Court, and of Elizabeth City County. He was also commissioner of accounts, before and after the American Revolutionary War, He was the mayor of Williamsburg serving twice from 1766 to 1767 and again from 1771 to 1772. He was also a clerk of the Committee of Courts of Justices at the House of Burgesses. Everard was a member of the Court of Directors of a psychiatric hospital (now called Eastern State Hospital).

== Supported Virginia's independence ==
Everard signed the 1770 Non-Importation agreement in support of Virginia's fight for independence from the British Empire. He served on the committee that elected delegates from Virginia to the Continental Congress.

== Personal life ==
He was married to Diana Robinson (born September 12, 1726), daughter of Major Anthony Robinson of York County, Virginia. The Robinsons were a prominent family in the area, which helped him to become more prominent. They had two daughters: Frances "Fanny" married the Rev. James Horrocks of Bruton Parish Church and president of the College of William & Mary. Martha "Patsy" married Dr. Isaac Hall of Petersburg, Virginia in 1774.

Everard purchased the Brush-Everard House in 1775 and the rear portion of the property in 1773. He owned several enslaved people, including those who greeted visitors and rode in his carriage with him, such as when he traveled to the county court in Yorktown. He purchased 1000 acres in western Virginia and 600 acres on the edge of Williamsburg.

He died in 1781, without evidence of a will. Diana, his wife, is believed to have died in the late 1750s or the early 1760s. After Frances's husband died in 1772, she was in poor health and moved back to her father's house until her death in December 1773. Martha lived with her father until or after her marriage in 1774. After her father died, Martha and her husband inherited property owned by her father and her sister.

Preceded by incomplete record	Mayor of Williamsburg, Virginia; 1766–1767	Succeeded by James Cocke
Preceded by John Randolph	Mayor of Williamsburg, Virginia; 1771–1772	Succeeded by James Cocke
