= Brush-Everard House =

House in Williamsburg, Virginia, USA

Thomas Everard House
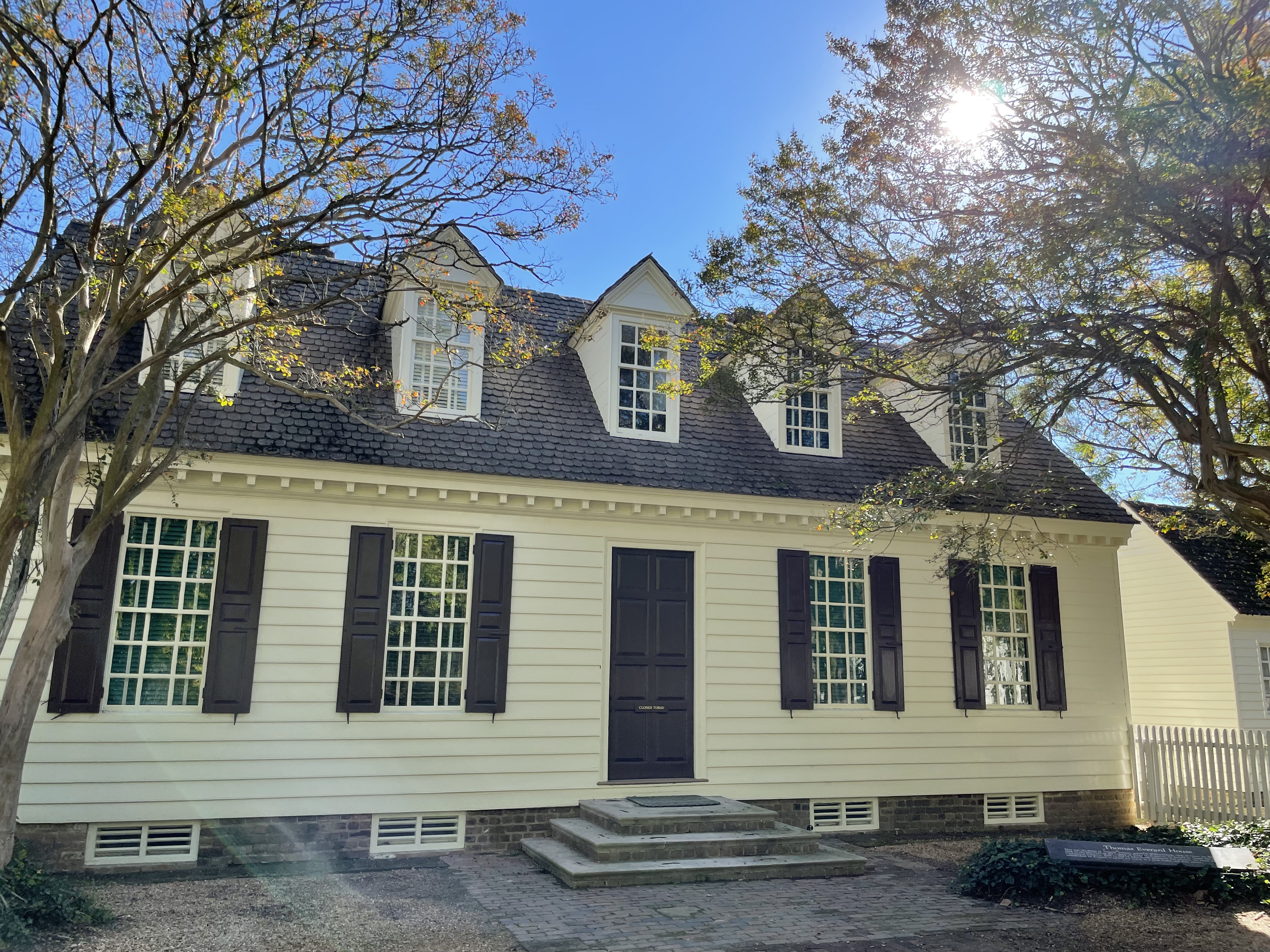
- The Thomas Everard House, 2022
- Interactive map of the Thomas Everard House area
- Former names: Audrey House, Smith House, Governor John Page House
- Alternative names: Thomas Everard House, Everard House, Brush-Everard House

General information
- Status: Museum
- Location: Williamsburg, Virginia, United States
- Coordinates: 37°16′24.86″N 76°42′5.61″W
- Named for: John Bush, Thomas Everard
- Construction started: 1717
- Construction stopped: 1718
- Renovated: 1949–1951

Technical details
- Material: Hand-split weatherboard
- Floor count: One and a half story

Website
- Colonial Williamsburg Everard House and Colonial Williamsburg Foundation Brush-Everard House

External media

Images
- Pictures: Restored Thomas Everard House at Colonial Williamsburg

Video
- Thomas Everard House - Colonial Williamsburg
- The Parlor at Thomas Everard House

The Thomas Everard House, also known as the Everard House and Brush-Everard House, was built by John Bush ca. 1718. One of the oldest houses in Virginia and in Williamsburg, it is located on the east side of Palace Green and next to the Governor's Palace. It is a "five-bay, timber framed, story-and-a-half house of hand-split weatherboard".

== 18th century ==
Brush, an immigrant from England, bought the property in 1717 and then began building the house. He was an early gunsmith in Williamsburg. The house was owned by Elizabeth Russell and her husband Henry Cary between 1729 and 1742. Cary had completed the Governor's Palace and built the President's House and chapel at the College of William & Mary. During the Carys' ownership, much of the wood trim and the elaborate stairway with "its elaborately turned balusters, sweeping handrails, and richly ornamented carving on the stair brackets" were added to the house. The house was bought by artist and dancer William Dering in 1742.

About 1755, Thomas Everard purchased the front portion of the lot. He was elected mayor of Williamsburg two times and he was the clerk of the Committee of Courts of Justice at the House of Burgesses. Everard bought the rear portion of the property in 1773. In the early 1770s, Everard built a rear or south wing to the house. He also added wainscoting to the rooms on the first floor, wallpapered several rooms, and painted and carpeted the parlor. In 1782, there were six structures on the lot, including a kitchen, smokehouse, stables, privies, laundry, and a dairy. It has formal-style gardens behind the house and natural English landscape surrounding the pond. East of the house, there are ancient boxwoods, dating back to 1830. It is also known as the Governor John Page house. Page is believed to have had it as a townhouse.

== 19th and 20th century ==
Sydney Smith purchased the property in the mid 19th century and he added a porch onto the front of the house, a brick office building next to the house, and a shed addition, which replaced the south wing. It was operated as a boarding house by Estelle and Cora Smith, during which time it was known as the Smith house.

Margaret Johnson featured the house in her novel Audrey (1902) and it was also known as the Audrey House.

The house was restored in 1949 to 1951 to the condition of the house in 1773 when it was owned by Thomas Everard. The porch and a door on the second floor to the balcony were removed, as was the brick law office. It was then opened to the public.
