= Lydia Broadnax =

American 18th-century free Black woman and business owner

Lydia "Liddy" Broadnax
- Born: Lydia Broadnax ca. 1742; Williamsburg, Virginia, U.S.
- Died: ca. 1820s Richmond, Virginia
- Occupations: Businesswoman and civil rights activist

Lydia "Liddy" Broadnax (c. 1742 – c. 1820s) was an American free Black woman, former enslaved person, and businesswoman who lived in Williamsburg and later Richmond, Virginia. Some historians have suggested that Broadnax was a concubine of her former enslaver and later employer, Founding Father George Wythe. She was denied the right to testify in the trial regarding his murder because of her race.

== Life ==
Lydia Broadnax was born into slavery around 1742. She was enslaved by George Wythe in Williamsburg, forced to work as a housemaid and cook for his household. She may have first been referenced in 1778 when Martha Jefferson noted that she "gave Mrs. Wythe's cook" eighteen shillings.

Wythe filed manumission papers for Broadnax on August 20, 1787, two days after his wife Elizabeth's death. She likely adopted her surname after gaining her freedom. Broadnax continued to work for Wythe as a paid servant. Four years later, Broadnax accompanied Wythe as he moved to Richmond, where he had previously commuted four times yearly to handle the Chancery Court business. In addition, a young mixed-race youth, Michael Brown, born free in 1790, lived in Wythe's household.

By 1797, Broadnax owned her own home, where she and Brown lived, and operated a boarding house. Wythe took an interest in Brown, taught him Greek, and shared his personal library with him. In 1801, at Wythe's request, his friend President Thomas Jefferson intervened to ensure that Broadnax received repayment from a white man she had loaned money to.

On May 25, 1806, Broadnax was likely poisoned by George Wythe Sweeney, who had poisoned the Wythe's household coffee with arsenic, intending to murder his great-uncle George Wythe to obtain his inheritance. Wythe and Brown died as a result of the poisoning. Broadnax survived the poisoning but was left almost completely blinded and in poor health. Because African American witnesses were not permitted to testify against white defendants in Virginia at that time, Broadnax was barred from presenting her evidence to the court during the George Sweeney Trial, where he was found not guilty and acquitted of all charges.

After George Wythe died in 1806, Broadnax contacted Thomas Jefferson for financial assistance. Jefferson sent Broadnax $50. Jefferson also borrowed a portrait of Wythe owned by Broadnax to have a copy made for his Monticello estate.

In 1819, Broadnax again sought Jefferson's assistance when William DuVal (Wythe's executor) sold her house in Richmond despite provisions in Wythe's will to provide for her after his death.

=== Relationship with Wythe ===
Some historians have regarded Broadnax as the possible concubine of Wythe and mother of Michael Brown. Historian Fawn M. Brodie, who linked Thomas Jefferson and Sally Hemings, has suggested that Broadnax was Wythe's lover and that Michael Brown was their son. Historian Bruce Chadwick also included this claim in his 2009 book regarding Wythe. In his 2013 book, The United States of the United Races, historian Greg Carter wrote that Broadnax "was likely [Wythe's] concubine."

This assertion was also recorded in the 1856 "Memoranda Concerning the Death of Chancellor Wythe," also known as the "Dove Memo," which was a statement of the recollections of Dr. John Dove of Richmond, Virginia, recorded by Thomas Hicks Wynne.

Historian Philip D. Morgan has noted that there is no documented gossip about Wythe and Broadnax when they were alive, unlike the case of Jefferson and Hemings, which was covered by newspapers and in individuals' letters and diaries.

== Death and legacy ==
Broadnax died in the 1820s, leaving property and a half-acre lot to her free grandnephews. Her will was entered into the Court of Hustings in Richmond on February 26, 1827.

In his book The Two Parsons, author George Wythe Munford described Broadnax as "a servant of the olden time, respected and trusted by her master, and devotedly attached to him and his—one of those whom he had liberated, but who lived with him from affection."

Colonial Williamsburg tells the stories of 18th-century African Americans, including interpreters in programs portraying Lydia Broadnax. She is also featured in the organization's "Living History" series and the "Lydia in Liberty for Lydia Broadnax" stage play.

Broadnax is a featured character in the stage play The Death of George Wythe" by Ron Larson.

Actress Harriott Lomax portrays Broadnax in "Bought and Sold in Williamsburg" in the episode "Unearthing Secret America" for Scientific American Frontiers (Season 13, Episode 1).
