= Bruce Chadwick =

American journalist

Bruce Chadwick (1948-2026) was an American historian. He spent 23 years as a journalist with the New York Daily News before receiving a doctorate in American history in 1994 at Rutgers University, where he lectured part-time.

== Writing career ==
Chadwick is a professor, historian, lecturer and author of over 28 books, including works on the American Civil War and a lengthy series on the general history of baseball in the United States, as well as books on some individual professional teams, such as the New York Yankees, Boston Red Sox and Chicago Cubs. In addition to his baseball publications on Major League topics, Chadwick has written about the Minor Leagues and on the history of the "Negro Major Leagues" during the sport's era of racial segregation.

With regard to the Civil War, Chadwick's first book—Brother Against Brother: The Lost Civil War Diary of Lt. Edmund Halsey—was published in 1997, then followed two years later by a dual biography contrasting the Civil War's chief executives and titled Two American Presidents: Abraham Lincoln and Jefferson Davis, 1861-1865, a work that was a finalist for the Lincoln Prize. He has also published assessments concerning theatrical screen portrayals of the war in The Reel Civil War: Mythmaking in American Film (2001) and about the economic, social, and political causes of the conflict in 1858: Abraham Lincoln, Jefferson Davis, Robert E. Lee, Ulysses S. Grant and the War They Failed to See (2008). Chadwick has researched and written extensively too about events and historical figures involved in the American Revolution and in the early formation of the United States, two examples being George Washington's War: The Forging of a Revolutionary Leader and the American Presidency (2004) and I Am Murdered: George Wythe, Thomas Jefferson, and the Killing That Shocked a New Nation (2008), the latter being an examination of the slaying of a Founding Father.

== Teaching career ==
He also teaches English and history at New Jersey City University in Jersey City, New Jersey.

== Selected bibliography ==
- Seminole Seasons (with Burt Reynolds). Taylor Publishing Company. 1994. ISBN 0878338691.
- 1858: Abraham Lincoln, Jefferson Davis, Robert E. Lee, Ulysses S. Grant and the War They Failed to See
- Lincoln for President: An Unlikely Candidate, An Audacious Strategy, and the Victory No One Saw Coming
- George Washington's War: The Forging of a Revolutionary Leader and the American Presidency. Sourcebooks, Inc. 2004. ISBN 1402202229.
- The First American Army: The Untold Story of George Washington and the Men behind America's First Fight for Freedom
- The General and Mrs. Washington
- When the Game Was Black and White: The Illustrated History of Baseball's Negro Leagues
- Traveling The Underground Railroad: A Visitor's Guide to More Than 300 Sites
- The Reel Civil War: Mythmaking in American Film. Knopf. 2001. ISBN 0375409181.
- I Am Murdered: George Wythe, Thomas Jefferson, and the Killing That Shocked a New Nation. Wiley. 2009. ISBN 1620455579.
- Triumvirate: The Story of the Unlikely Alliance That Saved the Constitution and United the Nation. Sourcebooks. 2009. ISBN 1435136101.
- James and Dolley Madison: America's First Power Couple. Prometheus Books. 2014. ISBN 1616148357.
- Gettysburg: The Tide Turns. Pegasus. 2025.

== Filmography ==
Year	Film or TV Series	Role	Notes
2008	Pritzker Military Library Presents	Himself	1858 episode for PBS
2008	The Real George Washington	Himself	TV movie documentary
2007	The Revolution	Himself	TV series
2007	Moving Midway	Himself	
