= Wythe House =

Historic house in Virginia, United States

- U.S. National Register of Historic Places
- U.S. National Historic Landmark
- U.S. National Historic Landmark District – Contributing property
- Virginia Landmarks Register
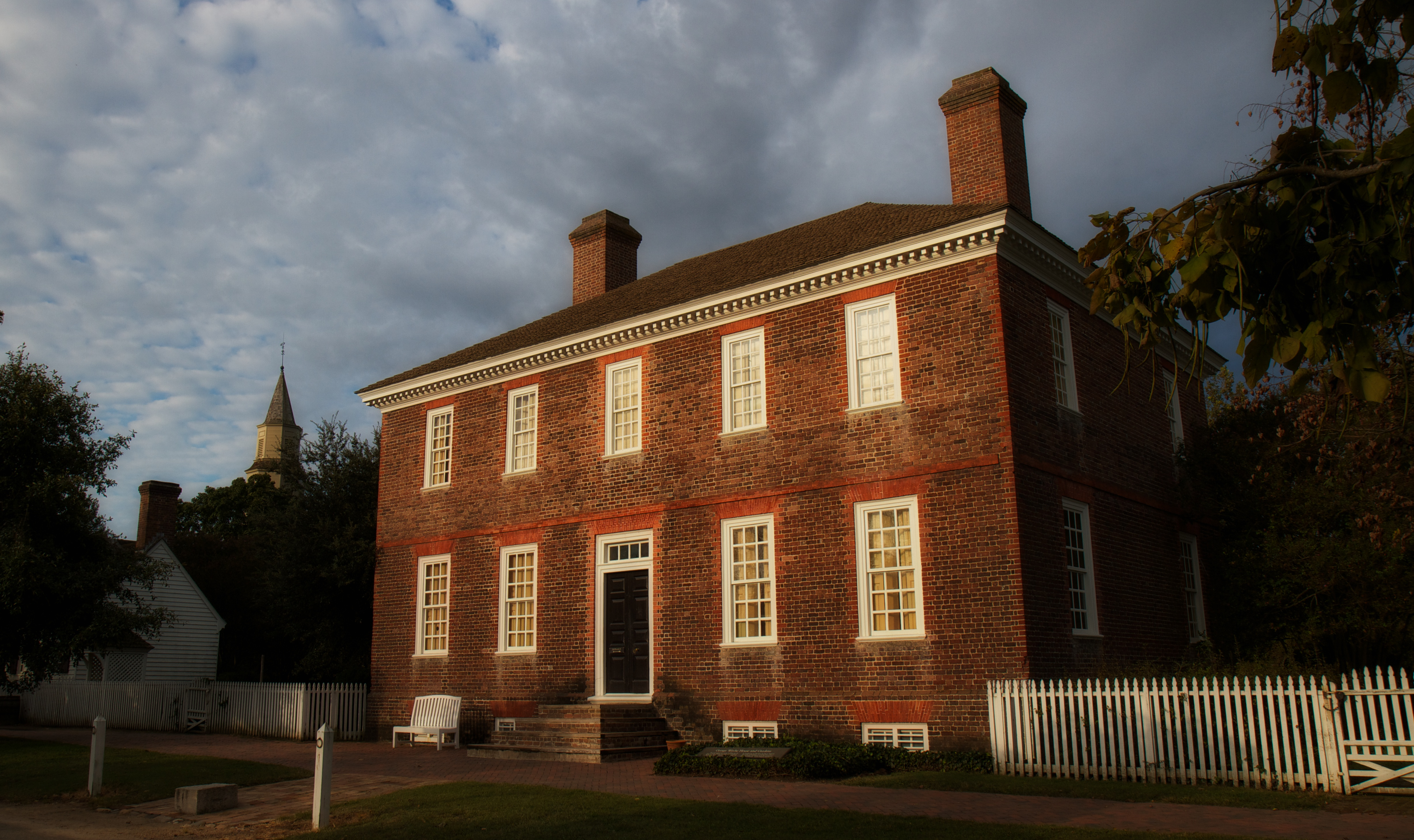
- View of the Wythe House from Palace Street

- Location within Virginia Location within the United States
- Location: W side of the Palace Green, Williamsburg, Virginia
- Coordinates: 37°16′18″N 76°42′12″W
- Built: 1754
- Architect: Richard Taliaferro
- Architectural style: Georgian
- Part of: Williamsburg Historic District (ID66000925)
- NRHP reference No.: 70000866
- VLR No.: 137-0058

Significant dates
- Added to NRHP: April 15, 1970
- Designated NHL: April 15, 1970
- Designated VLR: September 18, 1973

The Wythe House is a historic house on the Palace Green in Colonial Williamsburg, in Williamsburg, Virginia, USA. Built in the 1750s, it was the home of George Wythe, signer of the Declaration of Independence and father of American jurisprudence. The property was declared a National Historic Landmark on April 15, 1970.

== History ==
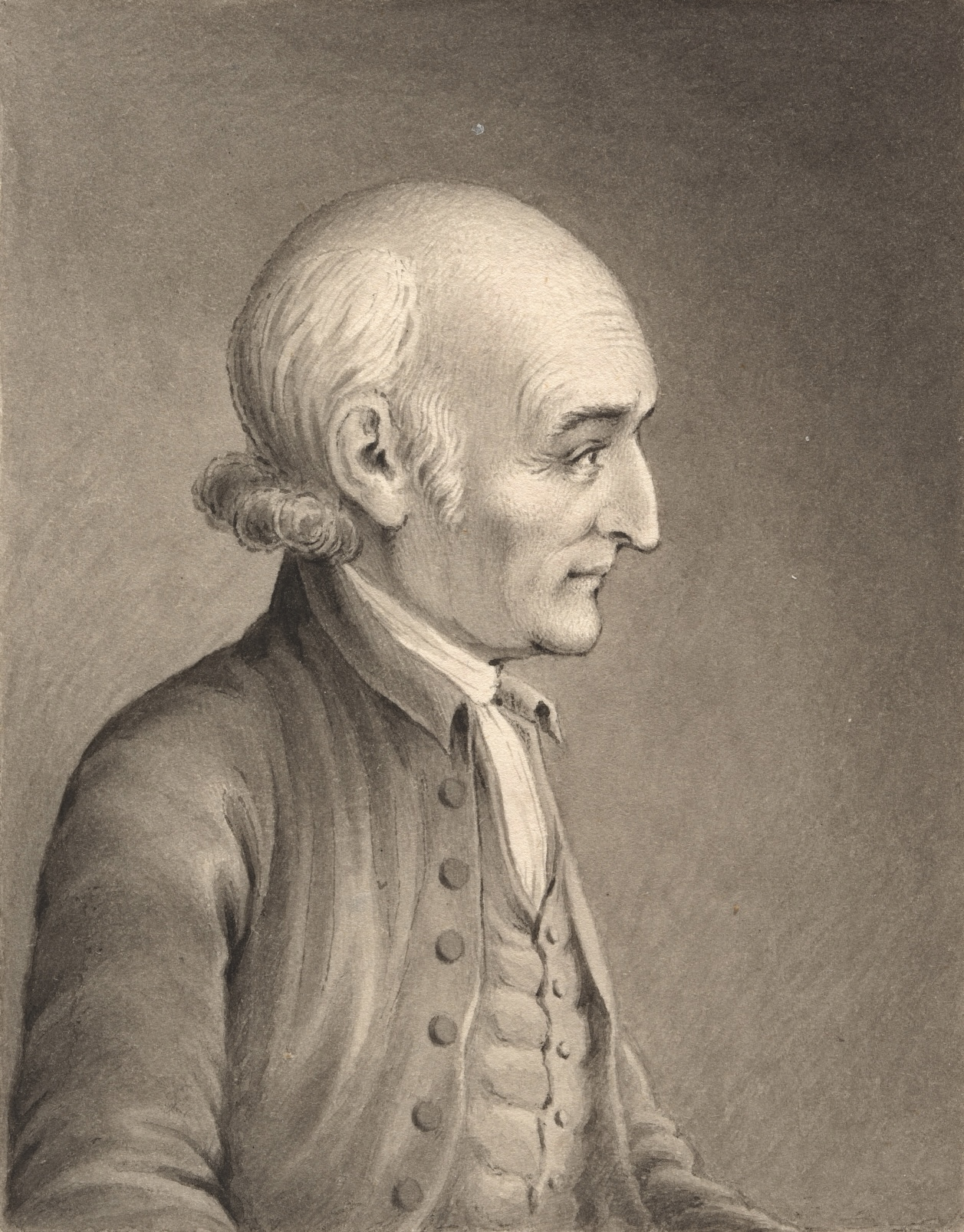
1825 portrait of George Wythe

The Wythe House once belonged to George Wythe's father-in-law, Richard Taliaferro. The house was constructed between 1752 and 1754 and was conceived as a whole with no additions made to the rectangular two story structure. The house was built during a period of time when the Governor's Palace was being renovated.

The house remained as the sole household of Taliaferro when his daughter Elizabeth married George Wythe in 1755. The couple received the house as a wedding present from Taliafero and they received a life tenancy upon his death in 1779. Elizabeth lived here until her death in 1787, and George moved to Richmond, Virginia in 1791 to serve as a judge.

The house served as headquarters for General George Washington – September 14 to 17, and 22 to 28, 1781 – prior to the Siege of Yorktown.

The house saw several subsequent owners. In 1926 the Reverend Dr. W.A.R. Goodwin, Rector of adjoining Bruton Parish Church, established his offices on the second floor after the Parish acquired the building for church use. Dr. Goodwin is known as the "Father of Colonial Williamsburg." Colonial Williamburg officially obtained the property in 1938, and in 1939 the interior was restored to the form and appearance the Wythe family would have known.

== Exterior ==
=== The house ===
The facade is constructed of red brick with white woodwork and is perfectly symmetrical, with the first floor having two windows on each side of the door, and five windows in alignment with the bottom windows on the second floor. The hip roof has brick chimneys rising from the side slopes of the roof. The roof is supported by a modillion cornice.

The lighter-colored bricks framing the windows and doors are called "rubbed bricks," as the masons would rub one side of the bricks against each other until a rosy color became evident. The house has a beveled water table and the walls are laid in Flemish bond. The entrance is reached by a small flight of steps with a large door with raised panels and a transom window.

=== The property ===
The property has fine conjectural gardens and several outbuildings including a smokehouse, external kitchen, laundry, poultry house, lumber house, well, dovecote, and a stable. The gardens consist of brick paths and hedges with several small shrubs dotting the landscape. The property is contained by a simple white fence with hedges trimming the edges of the gardens.

== Interior ==
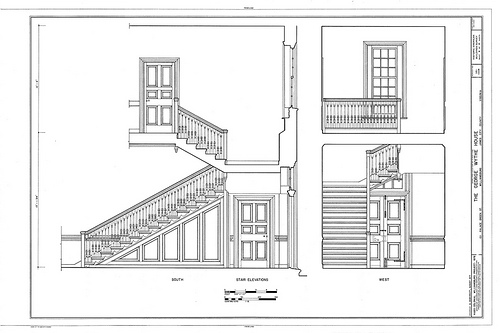
Interior, George Wythe House

The house is a standard center-passage, double-pile plan. A staircase rises on the left side of the passage. The hall contains four door lead to the various rooms.

The room interpreted as a parlor by Colonial Williamsburg is to the left before the staircase. A bowfat, a china cupboard, is built into the corner to the left of the fireplace.

The dining room is across from the parlor, which it mirrors. A fireplace and bowfat are in the inside wall. Wainscot lines this room; there is a crown molding.

A bedroom is located behind the dining room, with a door connecting the two rooms. A white chair rail divides the walls with a black base board. The floors are pine. The bedroom has another doorway leading into the main hall to the rear of the house.

The room interpreted as Wythe's office is located behind the parlor. The room contains a fireplace with a blue mantel and plastered firebox. The floors are pine.

The second floor is similar in layout to the first. A central hall runs the length of the house with four bedrooms in the corners of the house. Each of these rooms has a fireplace. The windows on this upper floor are actually slightly smaller than the first floor windows but contain the same amount of panels (18) and a double sash.

== See also ==
- Colonial Williamsburg Foundation
- List of Washington's Headquarters during the Revolutionary War
- List of National Historic Landmarks in Virginia
- National Register of Historic Places listings in Williamsburg, Virginia
