= Donald Broadnax =

American serial killer on death row (born 1961)

- Born: January 1, 1961 (age 65); Birmingham, Alabama, U.S.
- Convictions: Capital murder (2 counts); Second degree murder
- Penalty: 99 years imprisonment (1978); Death (1997)

Details
- Victims: 3
- Span of crimes: 1977–1996
- Country: United States
- State: Alabama
- Date apprehended: May 1996
- Imprisoned at: Holman Correctional Facility, Atmore, Alabama

Donald Broadnax (born January 1, 1961) is an American serial killer. Originally convicted and sentenced to 99 years imprisonment for fatally shooting a friend in Birmingham, Alabama in 1977, he was released on work release in 1996, whereupon he murdered his wife and her grandson. For the latter crime, Broadnax was sentenced to death, and is currently awaiting execution.

== First murder and release ==
Around 1:30 AM on August 20, 1977, the 16-year-old Broadnax got into an argument with his friend, 19-year-old Gregory Manson, in the Elyton Village public housing community. In the midst of their scuffle, Broadnax pulled out a gun and fired six shots at Manson, who fell to the ground. After emptying out his magazine, Broadnax reloaded and fired three more shots into Manson's body, before finally leaving the crime scene. Roughly three months later, he was arrested and charged with first degree murder. The following year, he was convicted of second degree murder and sentenced to 99 years in prison, with a chance of parole after serving several years.

In 1986, Broadnax was paroled and returned to Birmingham. Within the next two years, he got into contact with Raymond "Godfather" Mims, a notorious local drug dealer, who allowed him to live in one of his houses. The property was eventually raided by the police, who arrested Broadnax and seized several guns. As this was considered a violation of his parole, Broadnax was immediately returned to prison. In November 1992, he successfully applied for a work release program and was transferred to the Work Release Center in Alexander City. From there, Broadnax was hired as a painter for Wellborn Forest Products, where he was described as very mild-mannered and nice by his employer.

== Double murder and arrest ==
Sometime circa January 1994, Broadnax married Hector Jan Stamps, a 42-year-old woman from Sylacauga, who would often visit him in prison. On April 25, Broadnax was allowed to leave prison to attend his job at the factory, where he managed to convince the supervisor that he was going to leave later. While he was working there, he was visited by his wife, who brought along her 4-year-old grandson, DeAngelo Marquez Stamps. After leaving the boy in the car, Stamps entered the factory, whereupon she was beaten to death with a plank by Broadnax. After the murder, Broadnax stuffed her body in the trunk of his white Dodge Aries, and drove away with DeAngelo in the car.

From there, Broadnax drove to an isolated section of Elyton Village, where he got DeAngelo out of the car and beat him to death. He then stuffed the boy's body in the trunk of the car and parked it in front of a vacant house. Broadnax then hitched a ride to the Work Release Center, where he attempted to hide his bloodied uniform and boots under his bed. The clothing was found by two other inmates and reported to the prison guards, who immediately detained Broadnax. After linking him to the double murder, Broadnax was charged with two counts of capital murder. In the aftermath of his arrest, the handling of the work release program came under heavy scrutiny, especially concerning the admission of potentially violent felons. In response to this, Wendell Mitchell, the leader of the Alabama Senate, proposed a bill that would eliminate the possibility of parole for certain sentences, although he expressed doubt that it would actually manage to pass.

== Trial, sentence, and imprisonment ==
Broadnax was eventually transferred to a state prison to await charges, with the judge presiding over his case appointing William Brower as his attorney. During the proceedings, the jury was presented with two accounts of what had transpired: Detective Vincent Cunnigham testified that Broadnax had told him that on the day of the murders, Stamps had visited him to bring him food. They then talked for some time before she left, with Broadnax warning her to be careful and not to pick up any hitchhikers. This story was contradicted by the testimony of another inmate, Johnny Baker, who said that he had seen Broadnax driving the car with DeAngelo still inside it, but Hector was nowhere to be seen. The prosecution later brought in several other witnesses who claimed that they had seen a suspicious car around Elyton Village at the time DeAngelo was killed, in addition to presenting a bloodied woman's earring found behind the factory, which they claimed belonged to Stamps. When it came to motive, the prosecutors stated their belief that Broadnax was dissatisfied that Stamps was not doing enough to get him paroled out of serving his sentence for murder. On the defense's side, Brower claimed that anyone could have gotten their hands on his client's clothing at the Work Release Center, and that the almost three-hour trip from the factory to Elyton Village seemed too implausible.

On June 6, 1997, the jury found Broadnax guilty on all counts and recommended that he be sentenced to death. The verdict was met with relief from the victims' family members, while Broadnax and his family members wept. In September of that year, he was officially sentenced to death.

Broadnax immediately appealed his sentence to the Alabama Court of Criminal Appeals, which ruled 5–0 for resentencing hearing after determining that the jury at the original trial had been incorrectly instructed in regard to mitigating circumstances. Broadnax's death sentence was later upheld by the Court of Appeals in December 2000, along with those of three other death row inmates. Broadnax appealed again, arguing that he had received ineffective counsel, but the sentence was upheld again in December 2012. Another review of the case was denied by the Supreme Court in June 2013.

As of January 2025, Broadnax remains on death row and is awaiting execution.

== See also ==
- Capital punishment in Alabama
- List of death row inmates in the United States § Alabama
- List of serial killers in the United States
