= Chesterville Plantation Site =

Archaeological site in Virginia, United States

- U.S. National Register of Historic Places
- Virginia Landmarks Register
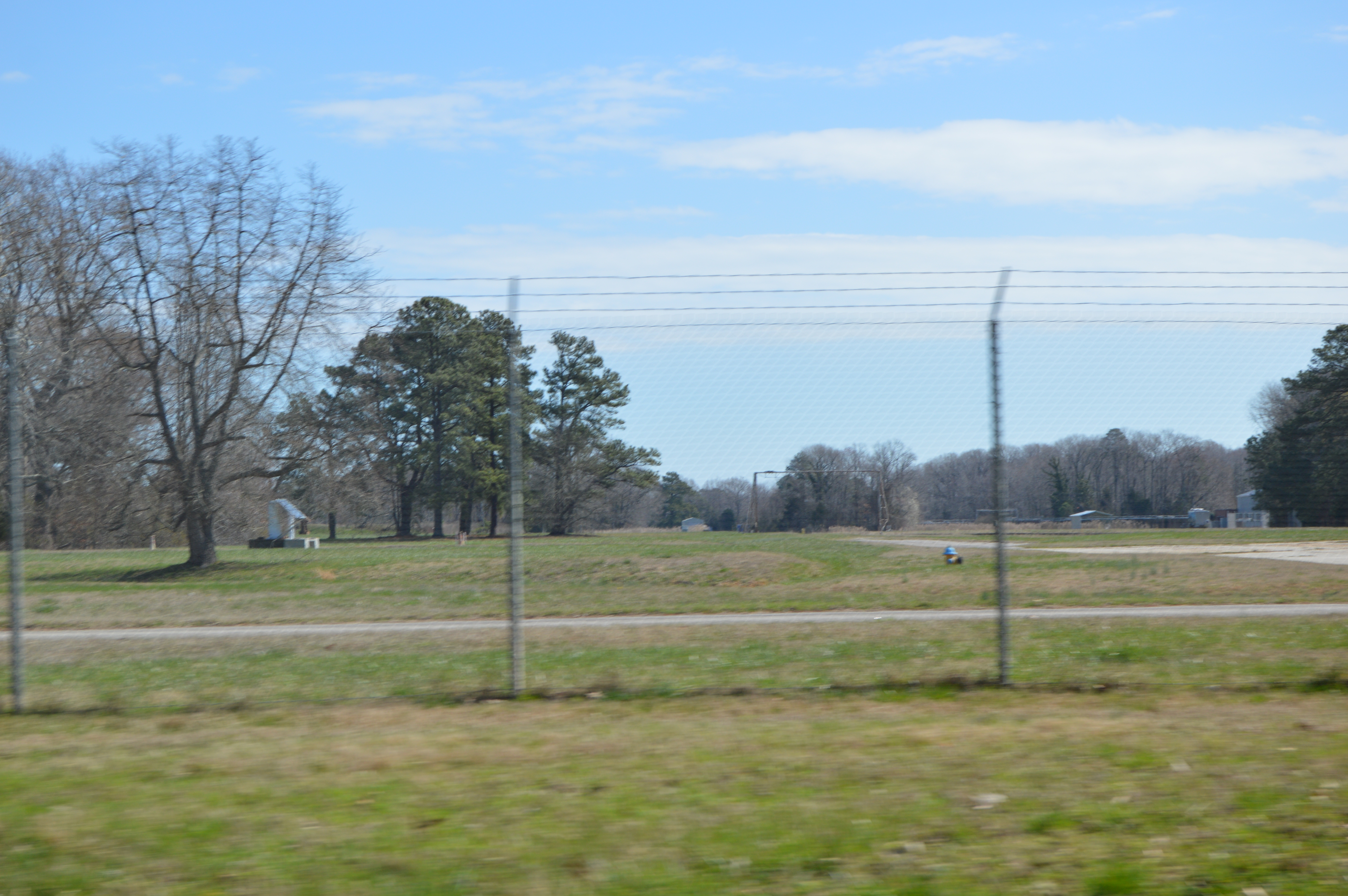
- Overview from State Route 172
- Nearest city: near NASA Langley Research Center, Hampton, Virginia
- Area: 30 acres (12 ha)
- Built: c. 1771
- NRHP reference No.: 73002211; 100007695 (decrease)
- VLR No.: 114-0098

Significant dates
- Added to NRHP: August 14, 1973
- Boundary decrease: October 26, 2022
- Designated VLR: June 20, 1972

Chesterville Plantation Site is a historic archaeological site located on the grounds of NASA Langley Research Center in Hampton, Virginia. The main house was built about 1771, and was a two-story brick house set on a high basement, with a three-bay gable end front, and stuccoed brick walls. The site includes the remains of the house, the ruins of a building with a ballast stone foundation, the foundation of a brick kiln, a cemetery, and scattered evidence of 17th century occupation. In 1755 George Wythe (1726-1806) inherited the property believed to have been his birthplace, and built the Chesterville Plantation house about 1771. It was his primary place of residence until 1775 and he continued to operate a plantation there until 1792. The mansion was destroyed by fire in 1911.

It was listed on the National Register of Historic Places in 1973.
