= Thomas Wythe Sr. =

Virginia burgess

Thomas Wythe

Member of the Virginia House of Burgesses from Elizabeth City County
- In office June 1680
- Preceded by: position created
- Succeeded by: Thomas Jarvis

Personal details
- Died: Elizabeth City County, Virginia
- Spouse: Ann Sheppard
- Relations: George Wythe (grandson)
- Children: Thomas Wythe Jr.
- Occupation: farmer, politician

Thomas Wythe (circa 1630-circa 1694) was an immigrant to the Virginia colony who grew tobacco and served as one of the justices of the peace who ran the county in that era, as well as represented Elizabeth City County in the House of Burgesses during the June 1680 session. During the next session, in April 1682, the county was represented by Thomas Jarvis (a ship captain who had married Elizabeth, the daughter of Sir Edward Duke and widow of former rebel Nathaniel Bacon) and Edward Mihill, who were themselves replaced by the November 1682 session. Capt. Jarvis had purchased land from William Claiborne to establish the port town of Hampton, which the legislature condemned (thus creating the town) that year, although the actual lots would be sold after this man died and William Wilson acquired them, then others platted lots. His son also Thomas Wythe married Ann Sheppard (daughter of John Sheppard) and had a son, again Thomas Wythe, who like him represented Elizabeth City County in the House of Burgesses, and whose son (this man's great-grandson) George Wythe would inherit the family plantation, but ultimately became a successful lawyer, legislator and judge who moved to Richmond, Virginia. This man's will entrusted four hogsheads of tobacco to his brother to maintain his son until he reached the legal age of 16 years old.
