= George Wythe =

American Founding Father (1726–1806)

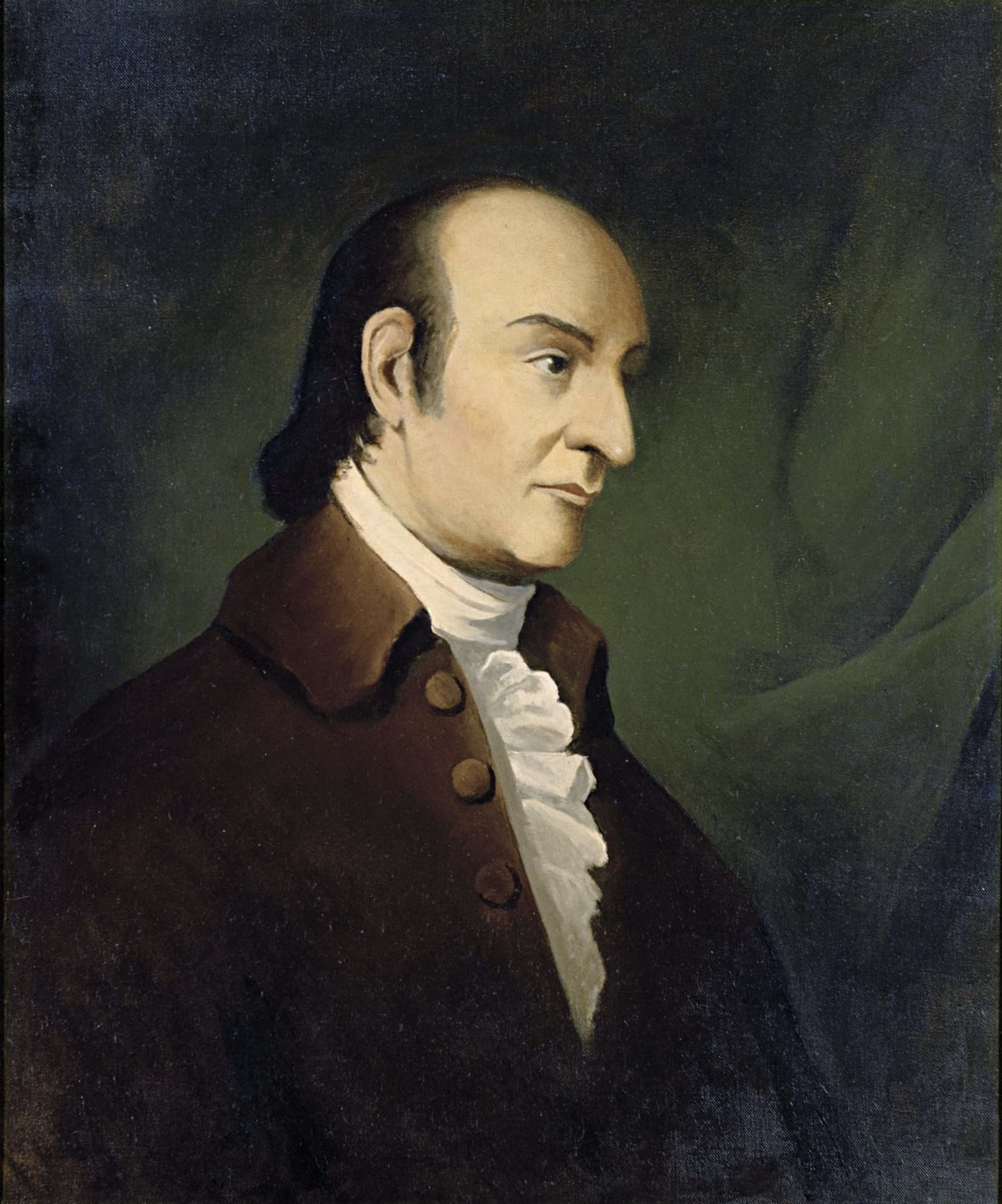
- Posthumous portrait after John Trumbull, c. 1927

Delegate from Virginia to the Continental Congress
- In office June 1775 – June 1776

Attorney General of Virginia
- In office January 29, 1754 – February 10, 1755
- Preceded by: Peyton Randolph
- Succeeded by: Peyton Randolph
- In office November 22, 1766 – June 11, 1767
- Preceded by: Peyton Randolph
- Succeeded by: John Randolph

Speaker of the Virginia House of Delegates
- In office 1777–1778
- Preceded by: Edmund Pendleton
- Succeeded by: Benjamin Harrison V

Mayor of Williamsburg, Virginia
- In office 1768–1769
- Preceded by: James Cocke
- Succeeded by: John Blair Jr.

Personal details
- Born: December 3, 1726 Chesterville, Virginia, British America
- Died: June 8, 1806 (aged 79) Richmond, Virginia, U.S.
- Resting place: St. John's Episcopal Church
- Party: Federalist
- Spouses: Ann Lewis (m. 1747; died 1748) Elizabeth Taliaferro (m. 1754; died 1787)
- Education: College of William & Mary (BA)
- Occupation: Lawyer - Academic - Politician

George Wythe (/wɪθ/; December 3, 1726 – June 8, 1806) was an American academic, scholar, and judge who was one of the Founding Fathers of the United States. The first of the seven signatories of the United States Declaration of Independence from Virginia, Wythe served as one of Virginia's representatives to the Continental Congress and the Philadelphia Convention and served on a committee that established the convention's rules and procedures. He left the convention before signing the United States Constitution to tend to his dying wife. He was elected to the Virginia Ratifying Convention and helped ensure that his home state ratified the Constitution. Wythe taught and was a mentor to Thomas Jefferson, John Marshall, Henry Clay and other men who became American leaders.

Born into a wealthy Virginia planter family on December 3, 1726, Wythe established a legal career in Williamsburg, Virginia, after studying under his uncle. He became a member of the House of Burgesses in 1754 and helped oversee defense expenditures during the French and Indian War. He opposed the Stamp Act of 1765 and other British taxes imposed on the Thirteen Colonies. He was also a delegate to Virginia's 1776 constitutional convention and helped design the Seal of Virginia. Wythe served as a judge for much of his life, first as a justice of the peace and then on the Virginia Court of Chancery. He was also a prominent law professor at the College of William & Mary and took on several notable apprentices. He remained remarkably close to Jefferson and left Jefferson his substantial book collection in his will. Wythe became increasingly troubled by slavery and emancipated all of the people he owned at the end of the American Revolution. Wythe died on June 8, 1806 at the age of 79, evidently from poisoning. His grand-nephew, George Sweeny, was tried and acquitted for his murder.

== Early life and education ==
Coat of Arms of George Wythe

Wythe was born on December 3, 1726 at Chesterville, the plantation operated by three generations of the Wythe family in what was then Elizabeth City County in the Colony of Virginia; now in present-day Hampton, Virginia. His paternal great-grandfather Thomas Wythe Sr. emigrated from England and established Chesterville, as well as served one session in the House of Burgesses representing Elizabeth City County. Although his grandfather, Thomas Wythe Jr., lived long enough to marry and sire a son, he did not hold legislative office. George's father, Thomas Wythe III, inherited the plantation and also served as a burgess for Elizabeth City County for several sessions. His maternal great-grandfather was George Keith, a Quaker minister and early opponent of slavery, who returned to the Church of England but was sent back as a missionary to the East Coast before ultimately returning to England. His mother, Margaret Walker of nearby Kecoughtan, a learned woman probably raised as a Quaker, instilled a love of learning in her son. In his later years, Wythe became known for his outdated Quaker dress and gentle manner, which could cause even a surly dog to "unbend and wag his tail." After the early death of his father, Wythe probably attended grammar school in Williamsburg before beginning legal training in the office of his uncle, Stephen Dewey, upstream in Prince George County.

== Personal life ==
George Wythe first married on December 26, 1747, when he was a 21-year-old county lawyer in what was then western Virginia, to Ann Lewis, daughter of Zachary Lewis, his law partner in Spotsylvania County. Devastated after Ann Lewis Wythe died on August 8, 1748, George Wythe returned home to Chesterville and accepted a position as clerk in the House of Burgesses in Williamsburg.

Six years later, after himself winning election to the House of Burgesses, Wythe married Elizabeth Taliaferro, daughter of colonial Williamsburg architect Richard Taliaferro. Elizabeth died after 32 years of marriage on August 18, 1787. During his marriage to Elizabeth, George Wythe showed an interest in genealogy, asking Thomas Jefferson for his help in researching the lineage of the Taliaferro first family of Virginia with origins in Italy. Jefferson heeded Wythe's request, sending him a sketch of the Tagliaferro [sic] family coat of arms learned from a friend in Florence, Italy in 1786, along with an engraved copper plate which is kept at the Wythe House, the historic landmark home built by Richard Taliaferro for George and Elizabeth.

== Career ==
Wythe was admitted to the bar in Elizabeth City County in 1746, the same year his mother died. He then moved to Spotsylvania County to begin legal practice in several Piedmont counties. In 1747, he married Ann Lewis, the daughter of his mentor Zachary Lewis. However, his wife died on August 10, 1748. The childless and bereaved widower returned to Williamsburg; there, Wythe made law and scholarship his life as he began a distinguished career in public service. His motto was "Secundis dubiisque rectus", translated as "Upright in prosperity and perils."

=== Colonial politician and mentor ===
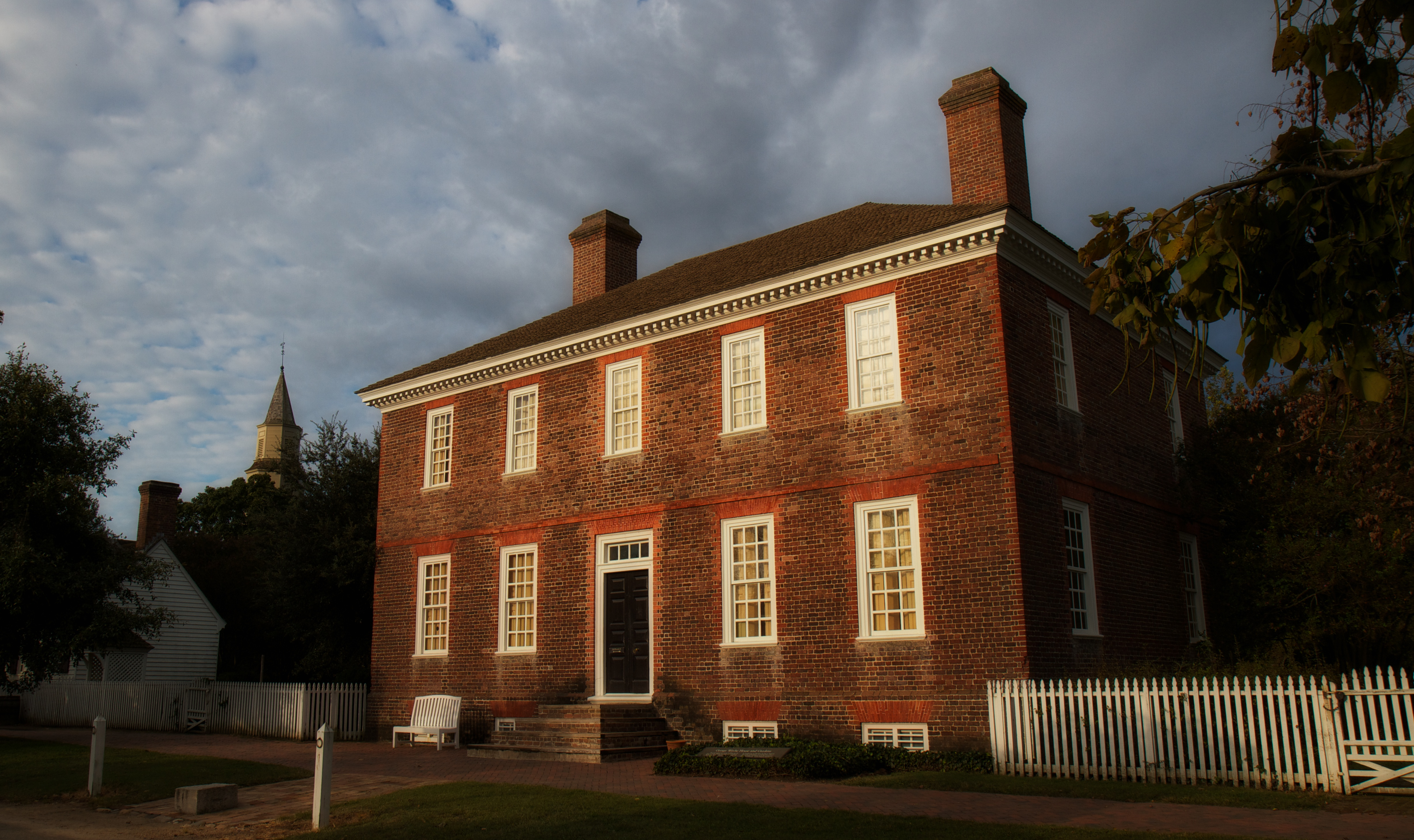
The George Wythe House in Colonial Williamsburg, Williamsburg, Virginia

In October 1748, family connections (Benjamin Waller was related to Zachary Lewis) probably helped Wythe secure his first government job as clerk to two powerful committees of the House of Burgesses, Privileges and Elections and Propositions and Grievances. Wythe also continued to practice law before those committees and the General Court in Williamsburg, as was permitted at the time. In 1750, Wythe was first elected as one of Williamsburg's aldermen. Wythe also briefly served as the king's attorney general in 1754–1755, appointed by Lieutenant Governor Robert Dinwiddie while Peyton Randolph traveled to London on the burgesses' behalf to appeal Dinwiddie's charging a one pistole fee to affix an official seal to land patents. Wythe resigned when Randolph returned from his unsuccessful mission. Dinwiddie returned to England less than three years after Randolph's return.

In the session of August 22, 1754, Wythe, then 27 years old, replaced the deceased Armistead Burwell as the burgess representing Williamsburg. In 1755, Wythe's elder brother, Thomas, died childless. Wythe inherited the family's Chesterville plantation and was appointed to his brother's (formerly his father's) place on the Elizabeth City County court. Wythe probably continued to live in Williamsburg, for his legislative work continued, and he married Elizabeth Taliaferro. Her father, planter Richard Taliaferro, built a house for them in Williamsburg which is called the Wythe House even though Wythe only had a life estate in the property after Taliaferro's death.

Wythe served as Williamsburg's delegate through the sessions of 1754 and 1755 (but not in the sessions of the Assembly of 1756–1758). During that gap, Wythe was reappointed clerk to the committees on Privileges and Elections and Propositions and Grievances, as well as to the Committee for Courts of Justice, and in 1759 to the Committee of Correspondence (with the colony's agent in England). In 1759, the College of William & Mary elected Wythe as its burgess to replace Peyton Randolph and reelected Wythe in 1760 and 1761. Wythe helped oversee defense expenditures related to the French and Indian War. For the Assemblies of 1761, 1765, and 1767, Wythe was one of the two burgesses representing Elizabeth City County.

Although known for his modesty and quiet dignity, Wythe eventually gained a radical reputation for his opposition to the Stamp Act of 1765 and later attempts by the British government to regulate the overseas colony. Meanwhile, Wythe maintained close friendships with successive Governors Francis Fauquier and Norborne Berkeley, 4th Baron Botetourt. Wythe also earned a reputation for personal integrity, which years later led Rev. Lee Massey to call Wythe "the only honest lawyer I ever knew." Fauquier, Wythe, and college professor William Small often socialized together—conversing about philosophy, natural history, languages, history, and other matters. In 1762, Small suggested Wythe supervise the legal training of a star student, Thomas Jefferson, which had a profound impact beyond their lives.

=== Law practice ===
In the summer of 1766, three events occurred that profoundly influenced Wythe, Jefferson, and several other Virginians who became Founding Fathers and insisted upon the separation of powers between three branches of the new government. When John Robinson, the powerful speaker of the House of Burgesses, died, his estate was nearly insolvent (with many debts, as well as outstanding loans), and the accounts Robinson kept as treasurer were irregular. Instead of destroying redeemed paper currency after the French and Indian War, Robinson lent it to his political supporters (fellow southern Virginia planters). Keeping the money in circulation helped these allies pay their debts but also tended to devalue the currency and defy the redemption laws the legislature had passed. Robinson's executors kept the names of the politically powerful loan beneficiaries secret for decades but did not manage to end the John Robinson estate scandal.

On June 20, 1766, Colonel John Chiswell (father of Robinson's widow and business partner of Robinson), Governor Fauquier, and William Byrd III killed merchant Robert Routledge (to whom he owed money) at the Cumberland Court House. Indicted for murder, Chiswell was brought under armed guard to Williamsburg for trial in the next session of the General Court (which included many men from distant counties who also served as Burgesses and was thus usually held at the same time). Before the group reached the Williamsburg jail, three judges (John Blair, Presley Thornton, and Byrd) stopped them on the street and allowed Chiswell to post bail until September, since the next court session began in October.

Meanwhile, the publisher of the Virginia Gazette had died. Two printers set up shops in Williamsburg when it became clear in the spring of 1766 that the Stamp Act would not be enforced. Both papers thrived in the ensuing controversies. On July 4, Judge Blair explained in a published letter that the judges had relied upon assurances of "three eminent Lawyers" that they could grant Chiswell bail, as well as two depositions that Routledge had run himself on Chiswell's sword while stressing that the high bail of 6,000 pounds sterling could be recovered should Chiswell fail to show for trial. In response, 'Dikephilos' wrote that his investigation agreed that Routledge had been drunk, but Chiswell was not, and further that neither deponent favoring Chiswell had witnessed the brawl. He predicted widespread violence if the trial unfairly favored the aristocratic defendant. More published letters followed.

On August 1, Wythe identified himself in print as one of the consulted lawyers and said his opinion had been limited to the legal bail issue. After Chiswell returned to Williamsburg in September, his attorney John Wayles published the two depositions given to the judges from Wayles himself and the Cumberland undersheriff. Judge Blair was furious when Wayles added a detail to the published copy of his deposition (which he had gotten from the court records) to track the undersheriff's deposition. On the other hand, Judge Byrd joined with Wayles to demand a libel indictment against Col. Robert Bolling, Jr., claiming Bolling wrote the anonymous criticism of the bailment published on July 11. The grand jury refused, issuing a no-bill instead. However, Wythe's sterling reputation may have been tarnished. When the assembly reconvened, Robert Carter Nicholas was appointed treasurer, Peyton Randolph became speaker, and his brother John Randolph became king's attorney general, a post to which Wythe had aspired. Chiswell died unexpectedly in his Williamsburg home on October 15 before his trial could begin. Jefferson, decades later in his Kentucky Resolution, echoed the anonymous 'Virginia Gazette' writer of September 12, 1766, who stated, "Distrust, the parent of security, is a political virtue of unspeakable utility."

Wythe continued his thriving legal practice with Jefferson's assistance. In 1767, Wythe introduced Jefferson to the bar of the General Court, and Jefferson was appointed clerk to the House of Burgesses. The following year, Wythe wrote the colony's London agent to secure copies of the burgesses' complete journals from the colony's founding until 1752, which were supposed to be transmitted annually to the king, secretary of state, and Lords of Trade, stressing "it be not made public nor attended with great expense." The secrecy may have related to continuing unrest in Massachusetts against the Townshend Acts or the administrative interregnum between Fauquier's death in March and Botetourt's arrival in October. Wythe also ordered printed journals of the House of Commons and case law books from London. Wythe's social standing remained high, for fellow aldermen elected him Williamsburg's mayor for the 1768 to 1769 term. Fellow parishioners also elected Wythe to the vestry of Bruton Parish Church in 1769.

Botetourt arrived on October 26, 1768, as Virginia's first governor to rule the colony in person in sixty years. Although Botetourt dissolved the House of Burgesses the following spring, following a royal order to all colonial governors after protests in Massachusetts against the Townshend Acts, Wythe managed to stave off the governor's clerk so the delegates could publish a resolution of protest before receiving the dissolution order. The burgesses then repaired to the Raleigh Tavern, where they passed the Virginia Nonimportation Resolutions on May 18, 1769. Some speculate that Wythe's status as clerk kept his name off that document. In any event, the burgesses held a spectacular party for Botetourt that Christmas and his funeral ceremonies the following fall were the most elaborate in Virginia's history. They also voted for a marble statue of the governor to be erected at public expense.

=== Revolution ===
The next royal governor, John Murray, 4th Earl of Dunmore, brought Wythe and Virginia to the brink of revolution. Dunmore arrived in Williamsburg from New York on September 26, 1771. Rumors of his rule as New York's governor, which included accusations of graft and companions roughing up local judges, soon followed. Although some cheered his military offensive against the Indians (later known as Lord Dunmore's War) as strengthening Virginia's land claims, Wythe, Jefferson, and many others took offense at Dunmore's haughty personality. Dunmore attempted to govern without the burgesses, but counterfeiting and other money troubles forced him to convene the assembly in early 1773. Delegates began by voicing concerns that suspects who burned the revenue vessel Gaspee in Rhode Island could be tried in England. When on March 3, 1773, they resolved to establish a Committee of Correspondence, Dunmore prorogued (postponed) the assembly. Moreover, Parliament passed the Tea Act in May 1773, and on December 16, the Sons of Liberty instigated the Boston Tea Party. Dunmore tried to reconvene the delegates the following May. On May 24, 1774, the House of Burgesses passed a resolution declaring June 1 as a day of fasting and prayer, which resolution Wythe signed and posted. Enraged, Dunmore dissolved the assembly. The delegates moved to conduct their business at the Raleigh Tavern and met again in mid-March in Richmond.

Wythe attended the Second Virginia Convention as Williamsburg's representative. The meeting was held in St. John's Episcopal Church. Patrick Henry stirred the delegates with his "Give me liberty or give me death!" speech. The delegates agreed to convene militia, and the prospect of armed resistance caused Dunmore to try to remove gunpowder stores from Williamsburg to Royal Navy ships stationed offshore. Wythe enlisted in the militia immediately upon returning home. In the Gunpowder Incident of April 20, 1775, Peyton Randolph, Robert Carter Nicholas, and Carter Braxton helped defuse Henry's attempt to force the return of the gunpowder by negotiating payment from Dunmore.

In John Trumbull's Declaration of Independence, Wythe is in profile farthest to the viewer's left. Trumbull's 1818 painting was used for the back of the U.S. $2 bill, but Wythe's image was cut out of that depiction.

On May 10, 1775, the Second Continental Congress convened in Philadelphia. When war seemed inevitable, Wythe was elected as Virginia's delegate to replace George Washington, who took command of the Continental Army. George and Elizabeth Wythe moved to Philadelphia by September and were inoculated against smallpox, as were fellow delegate Francis Lightfoot Lee and his lady and others. By October, Jefferson had rejoined the Congress to work with his former teacher and the other delegates, although personal tragedy forced him to leave for five months in the winter and spring. Wythe accepted many assignments relating to the military, currency, and other matters. He, John Dickinson and John Jay also went to New Jersey that winter and convinced that colony's assembly to maintain a united front.

When petitions and other attempts failed to resolve the crisis by the following summer while Dunmore's raiders harassed Virginia settlements from its waterways, Wythe moved and then voted in favor of the resolution for independence that Jefferson had drafted upon his return. His fellow Virginia delegates in Philadelphia held Wythe in such esteem that they left the first space open for him when they signed the Declaration of Independence. Moreover, John Adams, who did not like many Virginians, thought so highly of Wythe that he wrote "Thoughts on Government" concerning the establishment of postwar constitutions for state governments. Earlier in the session, Wythe had also exchanged humorous verses with his friend and delegate William Ellery of Rhode Island despite their political differences. Wythe thus signed the Declaration of Independence upon his return to Philadelphia in September. The signers' names were not made public until the following January, for all knew the declaration was an act of treason, punishable by death, should their rebellion fail.

During the war, Virginia became a battleground between Patriot and Loyalist forces. The farmer to whom he had leased Chesterville, Hamilton Usher St. George, was secretly a Loyalist, though he was acquitted of charges of being a British spy on April 23, 1776. St. George supported British raiding parties based in Portsmouth, which targeted local plantations as well as Williamsburg and other colonial settlements along the James River in raids such as the skirmish at Waters Creek. In January 1781, Benedict Arnold led 1,600 American Legion troops, which forced Jefferson to flee Richmond and burned the fledgling state capital, destroying many colonial records. Just weeks earlier, on New Year's Eve, Wythe had reportedly helped scare another British raiding party back to their ship. Finally, four boatloads of neighbors attacked St. George at his house on Hog Island on September 21, 1781, forcing him to flee to Chesterville, then to New York, and ultimately to England. Chesterville sustained damage before Wythe evicted Mrs. St. George to move into the house with Elizabeth while French troops occupied their Williamsburg home. During the Yorktown campaign which led to General Charles Cornwallis' surrender, American and French troops camped at Williamsburg, and Count Rochambeau occupied the George Wythe house. On December 21, 1781, a fire burned down the Governor's Palace and also destroyed a wing of the college, which included Wythe's beloved library and physics instruments.

=== Founding Father ===
Hurrying back to Virginia from Philadelphia, on June 23, 1776, Wythe began helping Virginia establish its new state government. Virginia's constitutional convention had begun months earlier (and had voted on May 15 to instruct its federal delegates to move toward a declaration of independence). Despite his late arrival, Wythe served on a committee with George Mason, which jointly designed the Seal of Virginia, inscribed with the motto Sic Semper Tyrannis, which remains in use today. The reverse side shows three Roman goddesses, Libertas surrounded by Ceres and Aeternitas.

Wythe's most noteworthy contributions in establishing the new state government began when he again returned from Philadelphia that winter. Wythe served on a committee with Jefferson and Edmund Pendleton to revise and codify its laws and helped establish the new state court system. Although few of their more than 100 proposed bills were passed, some concepts, such as religious freedom, public records access, and public education, became important in the new republic, as did the idea of intermediate appellate courts. When a fall incapacitated Pendleton, Jefferson and Wythe redrafted his portion (much to Pendleton's dismay). Wythe also replaced Pendleton as speaker of the Virginia House of Delegates the following term (1777–1778).

Wythe also continued working to establish the new nation. In 1787, Wythe became one of Virginia's delegates to the Constitutional Convention. Fellow delegate William Pierce considered Wythe "one of the most learned legal Characters of the present age" and known for his "exemplary life," but "no great politician" because he had "too favorable opinion of Men." In any event, Wythe, Alexander Hamilton, and Charles Pinckney served on the committee that established the convention's rules and procedures. However, Wythe left Philadelphia in early June to tend to his ailing wife. The following year, York County neighbors elected Wythe and John Blair to represent them at the Virginia Ratifying Convention. As Chairman of the Committee of the Whole, Wythe presided over oft-heated exchanges until the final day. Stepping down from the chair, Wythe spoke to urge ratification. Pendleton later wrote Wythe's "adherence to the Constitution" gave the margin for ratification when otherwise would have proven "grave for the Union."

=== Professorship ===
Wythe's teaching career began with his appointment in 1761 to the Board of Visitors of the College of William & Mary. It often overlapped and drew upon his legal and judicial careers. For more than twenty years, Wythe taught many legal apprentices, as well as students at the college. Among the most famous were future presidents Jefferson and James Monroe; future senators Henry Clay, Littleton Waller Tazewell and John Breckinridge; future Virginia judges St. George Tucker and Spencer Roane; future Chief Justice of the Supreme Court John Marshall; and future Associate Justice of the Supreme Court Bushrod Washington. Proficient in Latin and Greek, as well as known for his devotion to books and learning, Wythe initially taught students on a near-individual apprenticeship basis. Especially after Elizabeth died in 1787, some private pupils boarded at Wythe's home and received daily instruction in classical languages, political philosophy, and law. Of all these men, Wythe remained closest to Jefferson, with whom he worked and corresponded many times in the ensuing decades. In their friendship, the two men read all sorts of other material, from English literary works to political philosophy to the ancient sages.

In 1779, Governor Jefferson appointed Wythe to the newly created Chair of Law and Police, making Wythe the first law professor in the United States. As a law professor, Wythe introduced a lecture system based on the Commentaries published by William Blackstone, as well as Matthew Bacon's New Abridgement of the Law, and Acts of Virginia's Assembly. Wythe also developed experiential tools, including moot courts and mock legislative sessions, which are still used today. However, apprenticeship remained the main mode of learning law in that era, followed by examination before several practicing lawyers. Thus, Marshall and Monroe attended Wythe's lectures for a time and affiliated themselves with more experienced lawyers before being admitted to the bar. The college suspended classes during the later days of the Revolutionary War, after which Wythe taught in Williamsburg and performed his duties as judge (mostly in Richmond as the new capital) until the 1788–1789 term. Wythe then resigned from the college and announced that he planned to move to Richmond to concentrate on his judicial duties. Travel to the new capital for the four judicial sessions each year may have become onerous; many of Wythe's friends and colleagues had died or moved, and Williamsburg's intellectual and cultural life had also declined after the state capital moved upriver. Litigation involving professor Rev. John Bracken also distressed Wythe.

In Richmond, Wythe continued his pursuit of knowledge and even began learning Hebrew from Rabbi Seixas. One of Wythe's last pupils, William Munford, called Wythe "one of the most remarkable men I ever knew" and particularly remembered Wythe's scholarly philosophy, "Don't skim it; read deeply, and ponder what you read; they begin to make lawyers now without the 'biginti annorum lucubrationes' (twenty years of reflection) of Lord Coke; they are mere skimmers of the law, and know little else." St. George Tucker, his one-time student and fellow judge, succeeded Wythe as the college's law professor. He published an annotated edition of Blackstone's work before resigning in 1804 to succeed Edmund Pendleton on Virginia's Supreme Court of Appeals. In 1920, the college (now a university) established a law school named after Wythe and Marshall.

=== Virginia judge ===
Although Wythe served as what would now be called a justice of the peace in Elizabeth City County during colonial times, his reputation as the "American Aristides" derived from Wythe's judicial service after Virginia became a state and his scholarship discussed above. The oath Wythe drafted for its admiralty judges indicates his judicial philosophy, "You shall swear that ... you will do equal right to all manner of people, great and small, high and low, rich and poor, according to equity and good conscience, and the laws and usages of Virginia, without respect to persons. ... And, finally, in all things belonging to your said office, during your continuance therein you shall faithfully, justly and truly, according to the best of your skill and judgment, do equal and impartial justice, without fraud, favor or affection, or partiality." Wythe also designed the chancery court seal to illustrate the punishment of the Persian judge Sisamnes, killed and skinned after taking a bribe.

In 1777, Wythe became one of the three judges on the newly-formed High Court of Chancery. Administering equity and developing that branch of the law became his mission for the rest of his life. Wythe was elected to serve as a federal judge on the Court of Appeals in Cases of Capture in 1780, but he declined to serve. Wythe particularly despised lawyers who protracted litigation at great cost to the parties, though to their benefit, and even in his last days, he regretted the burden delays placed upon those seeking justice from his court. In the judicial reorganization of 1788, Wythe became sole judge of the Chancery Court of Virginia, refusing to be promoted with Edmund Pendleton to the Supreme Court of Appeals (now known as the Virginia Supreme Court). Both men refused offers from President George Washington of judgeships on the new federal courts. However, their colleague John Blair accepted an appointment to the United States Supreme Court. In 1802, the legislature created two more territorial Chancery Courts, but Wythe remained in Richmond.

In the 1782 Commonwealth v. Caton opinion, Wythe upheld judicial review of legislative actions, in what became a predecessor to Justice Marshall's decision in Marbury v. Madison. After Virginia courts had convicted Caton and two other men of treason, they appealed to the legislature for pardons. The House of Delegates approved their pardon request, but the state Senate refused. Wythe decided that the court had the right to review that pardon and that the judiciary was obliged to "say to them, here is the limit of your authority; and hither, shall you go, but no further." Pendleton and Blair agreed with this principle of judicial review, although on slightly different grounds. Nonetheless, after the decision, both legislative houses pardoned the men, sparing them execution.

However, Chancellor Wythe's decisions were often modified or overruled, particularly by the appeals court that his former student Spencer Roane joined in 1794. In 1795, Wythe published analyses of some of his cases and subsequent appellate decisions and added more pamphlets later. Although this publication offended Pendleton, he decided against replying in kind. One of Wythe's most famous decisions (unpopular at the time), Page v. Pendleton, upheld the authority of the 1783 federal peace treaty with Great Britain, which required debts to British merchants be paid under the contract terms. However, Virginia passed a law allowing payment in depreciated paper currency.

In Roane v. Innes, Wythe upheld Revolutionary War soldiers' pension claims but was reversed. Pendleton died in 1803, just before he could deliver an opinion attempting to reverse Wythe in Turpin v. Lockett, which dealt with selling the disestablished church's glebe lands, nominally at least to support the poor.

== Views on slavery ==
Wythe grew more anti-slavery as time went on and emancipated all of the people he enslaved at the end of the American Revolution. The problem of slavery preoccupied Wythe in his last years. In 1785, Jefferson assured Welsh abolitionist Richard Price that Wythe's sentiments against slavery were unequivocal. During the first two decades after the war, so many Virginians freed enslaved people that free blacks in the state had risen from less than 1 percent of the population to nearly 10 percent by 1810. However, the era also saw the development of increasingly harsh slave laws, particularly as enslavers feared rebellions similar to the Haitian Revolution, which began in 1791. Tensions increased in 1793 when 137 vessels from Haiti bearing French refugees and people they enslaved arrived in Richmond. Marshall and other prominent citizens wrote to Governor Henry Lee III about slave rebellion rumors and a white militia armed itself.

Six ships carrying between 500 and 1,000 black Catholic refugees, some free and wealthy and others enslaved, arrived in Baltimore in July 1791 and/or June 1793 after unsuccessful stops in Charleston, South Carolina and Norfolk, Virginia. Successively led by Sulpician priests who were fleeing the French Revolution and later by Redemptorists and Jesuits, the black Catholics worshipped in the basement of St. Mary's Seminary, then the basement chapel of St. Ignatius Church (renamed for St. Peter Claver) before they eventually formed America's first black parish, St. Francis Xavier Church (Baltimore, Maryland) during the Civil War era. Josephite priests became associated with the parish a decade later, and the parish moved in 1932 and 1968. The invention of the cotton gin in 1794 made cotton production using slave labor particularly profitable in the lower south, and those planters imported slaves from Maryland and Virginia, especially when importing enslaved people from Africa and the British West Indies became illegal and difficult.

In 1798, Virginian legislators forbade members of slave emancipation societies from serving on juries involving slave freedom suits. This prohibition probably affected Wythe as a judge in such cases and led the Virginia Abolition Society to all but disappear that year. In 1800 Governor James Monroe called out troops that crushed the rebellion led by Gabriel Prosser near Richmond, and 35 enslaved people were executed. Further rumors of slave insurrections led to alarms and executions, sometimes without judicial process, in 1802 and 1803. Also, in the legislative session that began in the spring of 1806, the year of Wythe's death, a law was passed requiring formerly enslaved people to leave the state within 12 months. However, a later modification allowed local courts to allow certain manumitted enslaved people to remain.

=== Manumissions ===
When Wythe's wife Elizabeth died on August 18, 1787, Wythe returned some enslaved people whom her father had bequeathed to Elizabeth to her remaining relatives. Wythe filed manumission papers for his long-time housemaid and cook Lydia Broadnax on August 20, 1787, two days after Elizabeth's death. Four years later, Lydia accompanied Wythe as he moved to Richmond, where he had previously commuted four times yearly to handle the Chancery Court business. In addition, a young mixed-race youth, Michael Brown, born free in 1790, lived in Wythe's household. By 1797 Broadnax owned her own home, where she and Brown lived and took in boarders. Wythe had taken an interest in Brown, taught him Greek, and shared his library with him. On January 29, 1797, Wythe also freed Benjamin, another enslaved adult who continued to work as his servant in Richmond; Wythe named Benjamin a beneficiary in his 1803 will, which included money for Brown's continued education.

Fawn M. Brodie, who linked Jefferson and Sally Hemings, suggests that Broadnax was Wythe's concubine and Brown was their son. Wythe's biographer Imogene Brown notes that Brown's last name and Broadnax's age made this unlikely. Philip D. Morgan notes that there had been no documented gossip about Wythe and Broadnax at the time, unlike the case of Jefferson and Hemings, covered by newspapers and in individuals' letters and diaries.

=== Judicial decisions ===
Wythe, for years, followed Virginia precedent (including the 1768 case Blackwell v. Wilkinson) as he adjudicated chancery cases treating enslaved people as property. Slavery matters often went to chancery because there were no legal remedies. Virginia slave laws also became more severe as Richmond's importance as a slave trading center for points further south continued to increase, and French planters from what became Haiti came to Virginia with thousands of enslaved people. Wythe authored two legal opinions that attempted to steer Virginia away from the slave-based legal and economic system entrenched in the early 19th century.

Wythe and Pendleton sat on the chancery court bench, which granted freedom to enslaved people in Pleasants v. Pleasants. However, that decision was appealed, and in 1799, after Virginia passed a law forbidding abolitionists from serving on juries in freedom suits, Wythe's decision was modified by the appellate court led by Pendleton and Roane, both former students of Wythe. This case concerned a Quaker's 1771 will, which purported to free enslaved people before Wythe and Jefferson drafted the 1782 law, which legalized manumission in Virginia. Robert Pleasants and some of his siblings had freed about 100 enslaved people as his late father had requested after manumission became legal and they turned 30 years old, as the will specified. Pleasants also lobbied extensively for manumission laws and founded the Virginia Abolition Society in 1790. Marshall and John Warden represented the enslaved people seeking their freedom, and Pleasants as the executor of his father's will, as they jointly sued the siblings who failed to obey the testamentary instruction. Each justice on the Court of Appeals in Pleasants v. Pleasants agreed with Wythe that the will could be enforced and called the enslaved people free. However, none of the justices (all slave owners) thought Wythe's grant of backpay proper, and they all agreed that children borne to enslaved parents would not gain their freedom until they repaid their enslavers' expenses in raising them, which in the intervening decades became quite large. Thus, although John Pleasants died owning over 530 people, fewer than a quarter received their freedom.

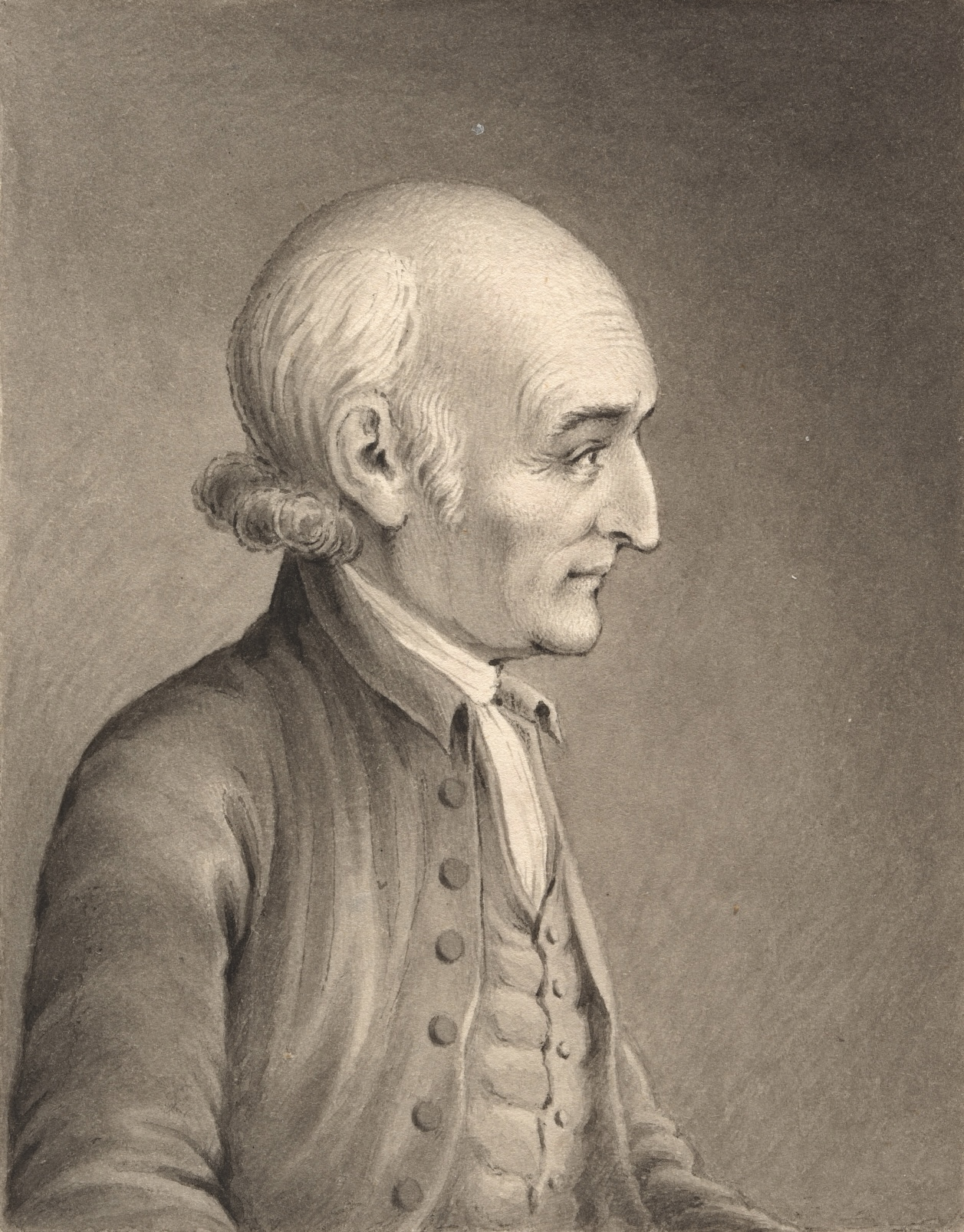
Posthumous engraving by James B. Longacre, after William Satchwell Leney, c. 1825

In one of Wythe's last cases, Hudgins v. Wright (1806), Wythe "singlehandedly tried to abolish slavery by judicial interpretation," according to Paul Finkelman. Jackey Wright, an enslaved person, sued Houlder Hudgins (who, incidentally, had purchased Chesterville from Wythe) for freedom for herself and her two children. Wright based her claim on her descent from American Indians, including a woman named Butterwood Nan. Indians were considered free in Virginia by this time. Wythe ruled in favor of Wright on two grounds. He examined the women and noted that all three generations of the family showed only Indian and white ancestry, with no evidence of African ancestry. Because Hudgins did not provide definite proof of Wright's descent from a slave mother, Wythe considered Wright and her children "presumptively free". Alternatively, Wythe held that "all men were presumptively free in Virginia in consequence of the 1776 Declaration of Rights." This was similar to a contemporary ruling in Brom and Bett v. Ashley, which held that Massachusetts' Constitution upheld freedom for all men.

When Hudgins appealed to the Virginia Supreme Court after Wythe's murder, all judges unanimously affirmed Wythe's decision, allowing Wright freedom, but only on limited grounds. Wythe's former student St. George Tucker affirmed Wythe's ruling only on the particular and limited nature of Indian enslavement in the state. The other extensive opinion in the case was by Judge Spencer Roane, another former student of Wythe, who contrasted the presumption of freedom for Indians and condemned Hudgins for failing to introduce evidence of any black ancestry of those seeking their freedom. Thus, all the appellate judges held that the two-decades-old Declaration of Rights did not apply to blacks. Although Tucker (a slave owner) rejected this judicial route to freedom, he had written in favor of emancipation. He continued to fight for emancipation in other political venues.

== Death scandal ==
By 1805, a grandson of Wythe's sister, 17-year-old George Wythe Sweeney, had come to live with his elderly namesake. The following spring, Wythe realized Sweeney had stolen some of his books, probably to repay gambling debts and support a dissolute lifestyle. Wythe also revised his will in early 1806 because Thomas Jefferson had agreed to educate the young mulatto Brown, although those new provisions would have no effect if Brown died before Sweeney, as happened.

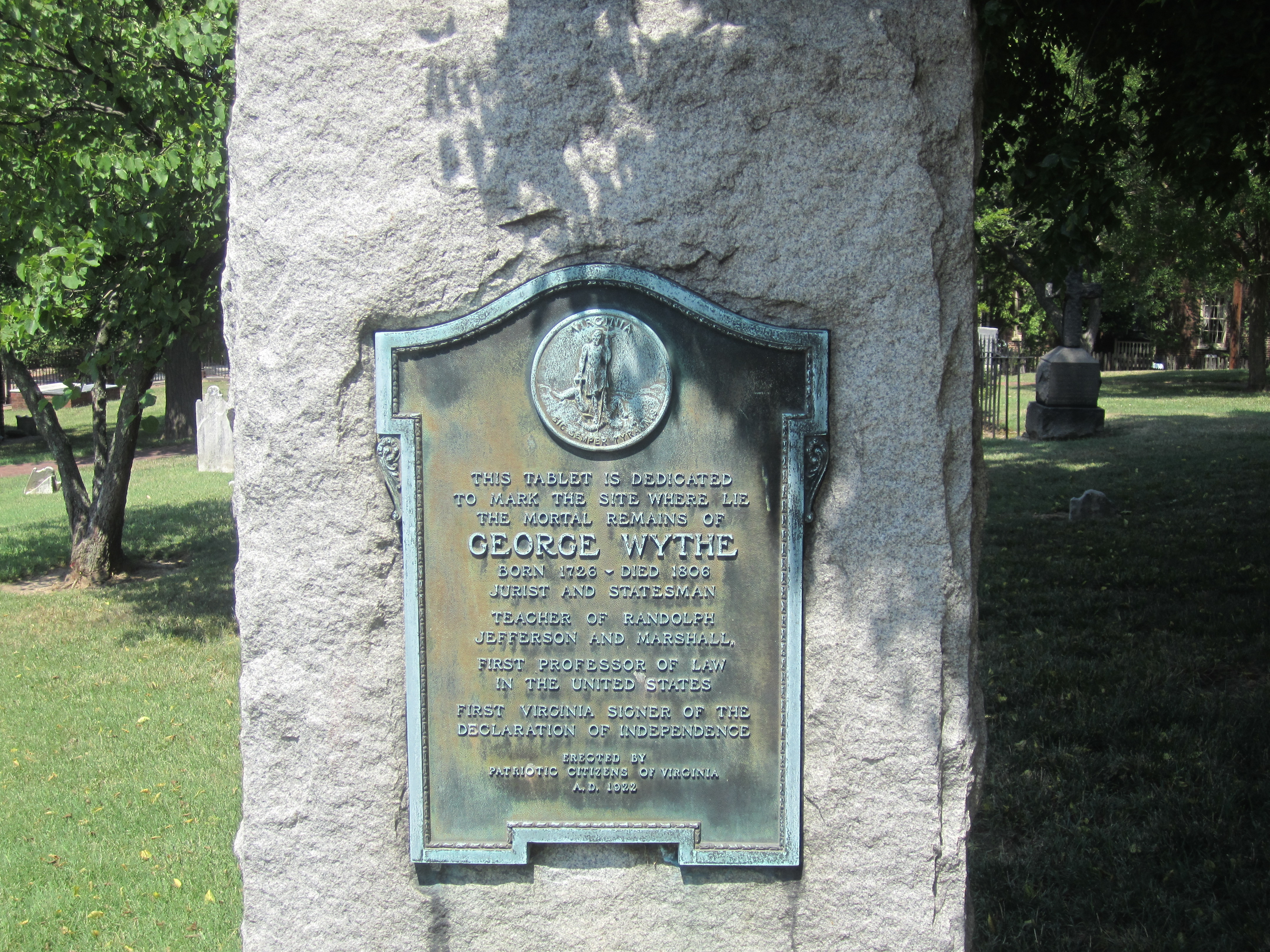
George Wythe gravestone at St. John's Episcopal Church in Richmond, Virginia

On May 25, 1806, Wythe, Broadnax, and Brown all became violently ill. Richmond's leading doctors, Wythe's old friend James McClurg, James McCaw, and his physician William Foushee at first suspected cholera, dismissing Wythe's claims of being poisoned. Two days later, Sweeney tried to cash a $100 check drawn on Wythe's account, which the bank found suspicious because Wythe's illness had become news throughout the city. The bank retrieved several earlier checks, which Wythe had previously denied signing. Gravely ill but still trying to work on legal matters, Wythe refused to post bail for Sweeney, who was jailed. Upon hearing that Brown had died on June 1, Wythe signed a codicil to his will drafted by Edmund Randolph that disinherited George Sweeney in favor of Charles, Jane, and Ann Sweeney. Wythe also told the doctors, "Cut me." Although McClurg often used bloodletting, the doctors agreed that Wythe called for an autopsy after his death. Oddly, Houlder Hudgins was an administrator for at least two siblings, who became Wythe's heirs.

Broadnax recovered (although she ultimately suffered the effects for the rest of her life and received some support from Jefferson). Broadnax told many people she had seen Sweeney put a powder in their morning coffee. Other black witnesses saw Sweeney drop paper from the jail, which appeared to contain rat poison. However, both trial judges agreed that Virginia race laws prohibited blacks from testifying at the trial.

Wythe died on June 8, 1806, and Sweeney was charged with poisoning Wythe and Brown with arsenic. Prominent attorneys William Wirt and Edmund Randolph defended Sweeney. The prosecutor was Philip Norborne Nicholas, Randolph's son-in-law. Early on, the judges quashed the murder charge relating to Brown because of his race. A jury acquitted Sweeney of Wythe's murder. Some attributed the verdict to the botched autopsy (which failed to use well-known tests for arsenic), and equivocal testimony by the physicians. Others blamed Virginia law, which since 1732 forbade testimony by black witnesses, whether free or enslaved. In a separate trial for check forgery, Sweeney was convicted. However, that conviction was overturned on appeal based on a technicality in the forgery law that Wythe and Jefferson had drafted years earlier (recognizing the crime only against individual victims, not against corporations such as the bank). Sweeney left for Tennessee. There, he reportedly was later convicted and jailed for stealing a horse. Afterward, he disappeared in history.

== Legacy and honors ==
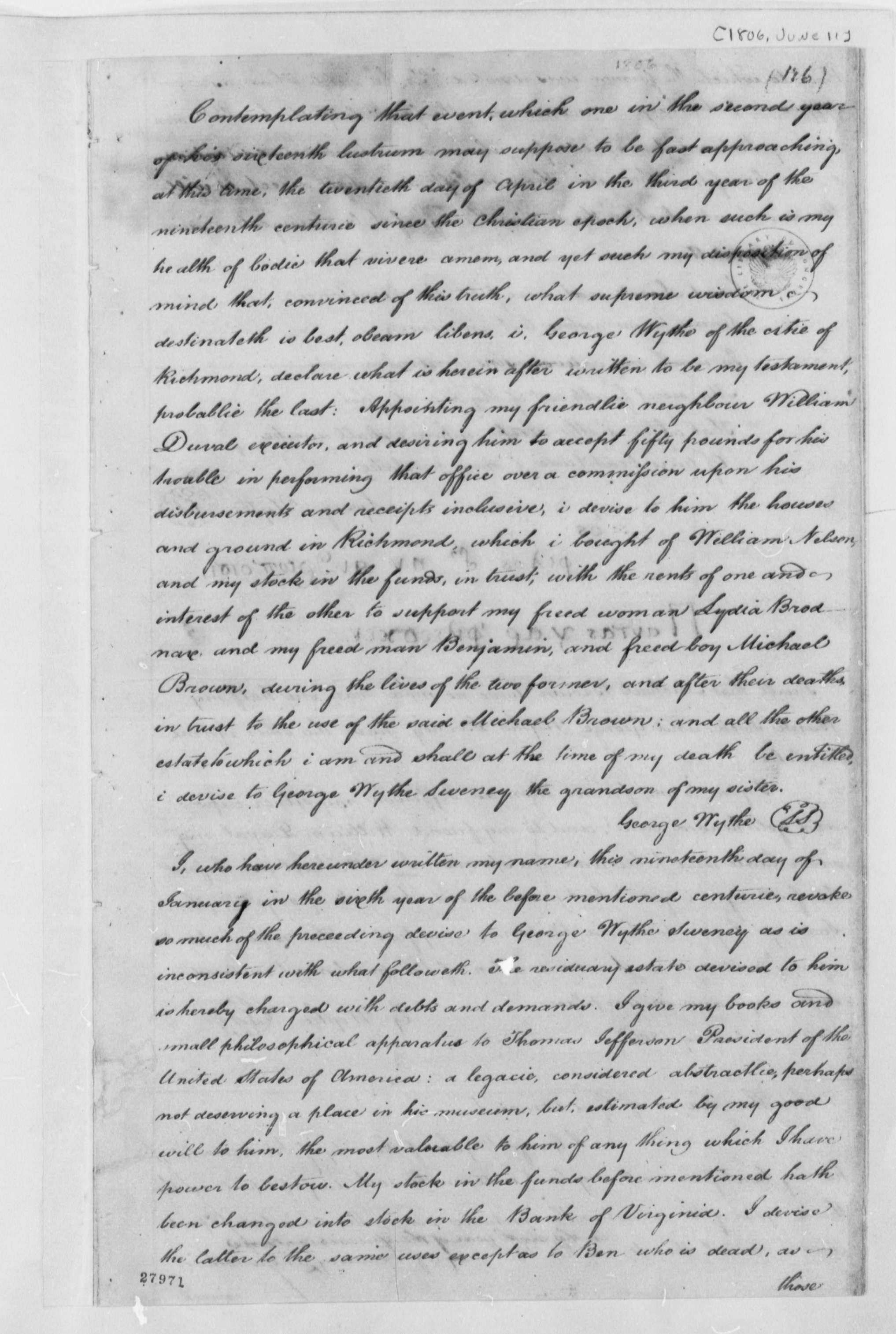
Will of George Wythe, 1806, leaving books to Thomas Jefferson

In 1790, Wythe received the honorary degree of LL.D. from the College of William & Mary. In his will, Wythe left his large book collection to Thomas Jefferson. This was part of the collection that Jefferson later sold to create the Library of Congress. Jefferson praised Wythe as "my ancient master, my earliest and best friend, and to him I am indebted for first impressions which have [been] the most salutary on the course of my life." However, Jefferson later refused an offer of Wythe's lecture notes and other legal papers, believing they should go instead to what became the Library of Virginia. Last reported either in the possession of Spencer Roane (who burned many papers before his death) or his ally Thomas Ritchie (publisher of the Richmond Enquirer), they were reported lost by the 1830s. Jefferson's grandson George Wythe Randolph, who became the secretary of war of the Confederate States of America, was named after Wythe.

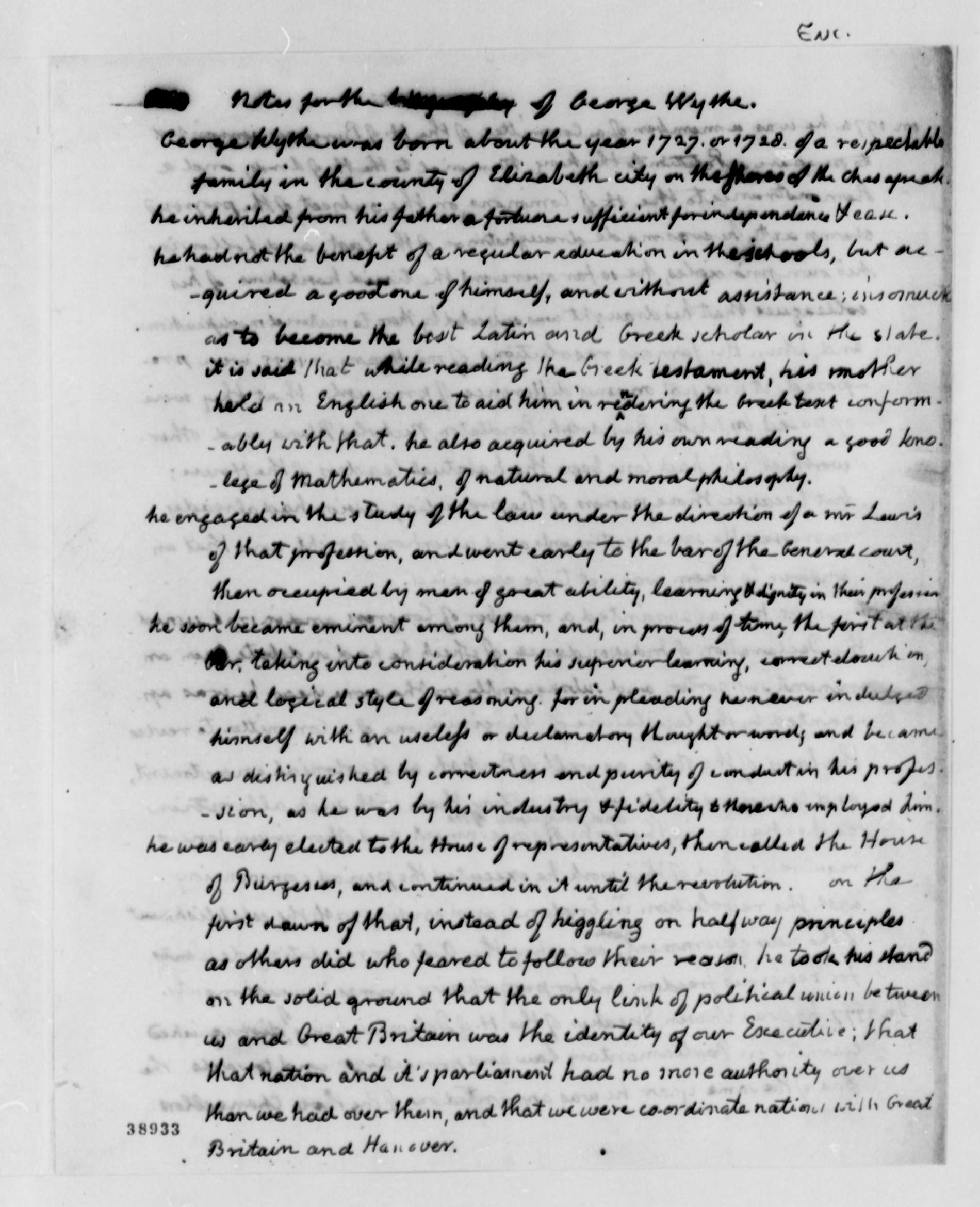
Thomas Jefferson's notes on a biography of Wythe, 1820

Places associated with Wythe remain preserved today, and over the centuries, other places have been named in his honor:

- Wythe's home in Williamsburg, Virginia, stands next to Bruton Parish Church, of which Wythe was a vestryman. His house was acquired by the Colonial Williamsburg Foundation in 1938. Today, it is operated as a museum, the Wythe House.
- Several places in Virginia were named for him: Wythe County, Virginia, its county seat Wytheville; the Wythe district and neighborhood, including the Olde Wythe Historic District in Hampton, a section of US-301 named Wythe Street in Petersburg; Wythe Avenue in Richmond.
- Several public schools in Virginia were also named for him: high schools in Wytheville and Richmond; a former junior high school and former elementary school in Hampton.
- The Marshall-Wythe School of Law at the College of William & Mary.
- George Wythe University in Salt Lake City, Utah.
- George Wythe Hotel in Wytheville.
- The World War II Liberty Ship SS George Wythe.

== See also ==
- List of members of the Virginia House of Burgesses
- Memorial to the 56 Signers of the Declaration of Independence

== Notes ==
Political offices
Preceded by James Cocke	Mayor of Williamsburg; 1768–1769	Succeeded by James Blair Jr.
