= Political party strength in Virginia =

Politics in the US state of Virginia

The following table indicates party affiliation in the Commonwealth of Virginia for the individual offices of:

- Governor
- Lieutenant Governor
- Attorney General

It also indicates the historical composition of the collective:

- Senate
- House of Delegates
- State delegation to the United States Senate (individually)
- State delegation to the United States House of Representatives

== 1776–1851 ==
Year	Executive offices		General Assembly		United States Congress			Electoral votes
Year	Governor	Attorney General	State Senate	State House	U.S. Senator (Class I)	U.S. Senator (Class II)	U.S. House	Electoral votes
1776	Patrick Henry (NP)	Edmund Randolph (NP)	[?]	[?]	began in 1789			
1777	Patrick Henry (NP)	Edmund Randolph (NP)	[?]	[?]	began in 1789			
1778	Patrick Henry (NP)	Edmund Randolph (NP)	[?]	[?]	began in 1789			
1779	Patrick Henry (NP)	Edmund Randolph (NP)	[?]	[?]	began in 1789			
1779	Thomas Jefferson (NP)	Edmund Randolph (NP)	[?]	[?]	began in 1789			
1780	Thomas Jefferson (NP)	Edmund Randolph (NP)	[?]	[?]	began in 1789			
1781	Thomas Jefferson (NP)	Edmund Randolph (NP)	[?]	[?]	began in 1789			
1781	William Fleming (NP) (Note: Member of the Council of State acting as governor.)	Edmund Randolph (NP)	[?]	[?]	began in 1789			
1781	Thomas Nelson Jr. (NP)	Edmund Randolph (NP)	[?]	[?]	began in 1789			
1781	David Jameson (NP)	Edmund Randolph (NP)	[?]	[?]	began in 1789			
1782	Benjamin Harrison V (NP)	Edmund Randolph (NP)	[?]	[?]	began in 1789			
1783	Benjamin Harrison V (NP)	Edmund Randolph (NP)	[?]	[?]	began in 1789			
1784	Benjamin Harrison V (NP)	Edmund Randolph (NP)	[?]	[?]	began in 1789			
1785	Patrick Henry (NP)	Edmund Randolph (NP)	[?]	[?]	began in 1789			
1786	Patrick Henry (NP)	James Innes (F)	[?]	[?]	began in 1789			
1787	Edmund Randolph (NP)	James Innes (F)	[?]	[?]	began in 1789			
1788	Edmund Randolph (NP)	James Innes (F)	[?]	[?]	began in 1789			
1789	Beverley Randolph (NP)	James Innes (F)	[?]	[?]	William Grayson (AA) (Note: Died in office.)	Richard Henry Lee (AA)	7AA, 3PA	George Washington (I) ✓
1790	Beverley Randolph (NP)	James Innes (F)	[?]	[?]	John Walker (PA)	Richard Henry Lee (AA)	7AA, 3PA	George Washington (I) ✓
1791	Beverley Randolph (NP)	James Innes (F)	[?]	[?]	James Monroe (AA)	Richard Henry Lee (AA)	8AA, 2PA	George Washington (I) ✓
1792	Henry Lee III (F)	James Innes (F)	[?]	[?]	James Monroe (AA)	Richard Henry Lee (AA)	8AA, 2PA	George Washington (I) ✓
1792	Henry Lee III (F)	James Innes (F)	[?]	[?]	James Monroe (AA)	John Taylor of Caroline (AA)	8AA, 2PA	George Washington (I) ✓
1793	Henry Lee III (F)	James Innes (F)	[?]	[?]	James Monroe (AA)	John Taylor of Caroline (AA)	15AA, 4PA	George Washington (I) ✓
1794	Henry Lee III (F)	James Innes (F)	[?]	F majority	James Monroe (AA)	John Taylor of Caroline (AA)	15AA, 4PA	George Washington (I) ✓
1794	Henry Lee III (F)	James Innes (F)	[?]	F majority	vacant	vacant	15AA, 4PA	George Washington (I) ✓
1795	Robert Brooke (DR)	James Innes (F)	[?]	F majority	Stevens Thomson Mason (AA)	Henry Tazewell (AA)	17DR, 2F	George Washington (I) ✓
1795	Robert Brooke (DR)	James Innes (F)	[?]	F majority	Stevens Thomson Mason (DR)	Henry Tazewell (DR)	17DR, 2F	George Washington (I) ✓
1796	Robert Brooke (DR)	James Innes (F)	[?]	F majority	Stevens Thomson Mason (DR)	Henry Tazewell (DR)	17DR, 2F	Thomas Jefferson (DR) ✗
1797	James Wood (F)	Robert Brooke (DR)	[?]	F majority	Stevens Thomson Mason (DR)	Henry Tazewell (DR)	15DR, 4F	Thomas Jefferson (DR) ✗
1798	James Wood (F)	Robert Brooke (DR)	[?]	F majority	Stevens Thomson Mason (DR)	Henry Tazewell (DR)	15DR, 4F	Thomas Jefferson (DR) ✗
1799	James Wood (F)	Robert Brooke (DR)	[?]		Stevens Thomson Mason (DR)	Henry Tazewell (DR)	15DR, 4F	Thomas Jefferson (DR) ✗
1799	Hardin Burnley (NP)	Robert Brooke (DR)	[?]	DR majority	Stevens Thomson Mason (DR)	vacant	13DR, 6F	Thomas Jefferson (DR) ✗
1799	John Pendleton Jr. (NP)	Robert Brooke (DR)	[?]	DR majority	Stevens Thomson Mason (DR)	vacant	14DR, 5F	Thomas Jefferson (DR) ✗
1800	James Monroe (DR)	Philip N. Nicholas (DR)	[?]	DR majority	Stevens Thomson Mason (DR)	Wilson Cary Nicholas (DR)	14DR, 5F	Thomas Jefferson (DR) ✓
1801	James Monroe (DR)	Philip N. Nicholas (DR)	[?]	DR majority	Stevens Thomson Mason (DR)	Wilson Cary Nicholas (DR)	18DR, 1F	Thomas Jefferson (DR) ✓
1802	James Monroe (DR)	Philip N. Nicholas (DR)	[?]	DR majority	Stevens Thomson Mason (DR)	Wilson Cary Nicholas (DR)	18DR, 1F	Thomas Jefferson (DR) ✓
1803	John Page (DR)	Philip N. Nicholas (DR)	[?]	DR majority	Stevens Thomson Mason (DR)	Wilson Cary Nicholas (DR)	18DR, 4F	Thomas Jefferson (DR) ✓
1803	John Page (DR)	Philip N. Nicholas (DR)	[?]	DR majority	John Taylor of Caroline (DR)	Wilson Cary Nicholas (DR)	18DR, 4F	Thomas Jefferson (DR) ✓
1804	John Page (DR)	Philip N. Nicholas (DR)	[?]	DR majority	Abraham B. Venable (DR)	Wilson Cary Nicholas (DR)	19DR, 3F	Thomas Jefferson/ George Clinton (DR) ✓
1804	John Page (DR)	Philip N. Nicholas (DR)	[?]	[?]	William Branch Giles (DR)	Andrew Moore (DR)	19DR, 3F	Thomas Jefferson/ George Clinton (DR) ✓
1805	John Page (DR)	Philip N. Nicholas (DR)	[?]	[?]	Andrew Moore (DR)	William Branch Giles (DR)	21DR, 1F	Thomas Jefferson/ George Clinton (DR) ✓
1806	William H. Cabell (DR)	Philip N. Nicholas (DR)	[?]	[?]	Andrew Moore (DR)	William Branch Giles (DR)	21DR, 1F	Thomas Jefferson/ George Clinton (DR) ✓
1807	William H. Cabell (DR)	Philip N. Nicholas (DR)	[?]	DR majority	Andrew Moore (DR)	William Branch Giles (DR)	20DR, 2F	Thomas Jefferson/ George Clinton (DR) ✓
1808	William H. Cabell (DR)	Philip N. Nicholas (DR)	[?]	DR majority	Andrew Moore (DR)	William Branch Giles (DR)	20DR, 2F	James Madison/ George Clinton (DR) ✓
1809	John Tyler Sr. (DR)	Philip N. Nicholas (DR)	[?]	DR majority	Richard Brent (DR)	William Branch Giles (DR)	16DR, 6F	James Madison/ George Clinton (DR) ✓
1810	John Tyler Sr. (DR)	Philip N. Nicholas (DR)	[?]	DR majority	Richard Brent (DR)	William Branch Giles (DR)	16DR, 6F	James Madison/ George Clinton (DR) ✓
1811	John Tyler Sr. (DR)	Philip N. Nicholas (DR)	[?]	DR majority	Richard Brent (DR)	William Branch Giles (DR)	16DR, 6F	James Madison/ George Clinton (DR) ✓
1811	George William Smith (DR)	Philip N. Nicholas (DR)	[?]	DR majority	Richard Brent (DR)	William Branch Giles (DR)	16DR, 6F	James Madison/ George Clinton (DR) ✓
1811	James Monroe (DR)	Philip N. Nicholas (DR)	[?]	DR majority	Richard Brent (DR)	William Branch Giles (DR)	16DR, 6F	James Madison/ George Clinton (DR) ✓
1811	George William Smith (DR) (Note: Member of the Council of State acting as governor; was later elected in his own right.)	Philip N. Nicholas (DR)	[?]	DR majority	Richard Brent (DR)	William Branch Giles (DR)	16DR, 6F	James Madison/ George Clinton (DR) ✓
1811	Peyton Randolph (DR)	Philip N. Nicholas (DR)	[?]	DR majority	Richard Brent (DR)	William Branch Giles (DR)	16DR, 6F	James Madison/ George Clinton (DR) ✓
1812	Peyton Randolph (DR)	Philip N. Nicholas (DR)	[?]	DR majority	Richard Brent (DR)	William Branch Giles (DR)	16DR, 6F	James Madison/ Elbridge Gerry (DR) ✓
1812	James Barbour (DR)	Philip N. Nicholas (DR)	[?]	DR majority	Richard Brent (DR)	William Branch Giles (DR)	16DR, 6F	James Madison/ Elbridge Gerry (DR) ✓
1813	James Barbour (DR)	Philip N. Nicholas (DR)	[?]	DR majority	Richard Brent (DR)	William Branch Giles (DR)	17DR, 6F	James Madison/ Elbridge Gerry (DR) ✓
1814	James Barbour (DR)	Philip N. Nicholas (DR)	[?]	[?]	Richard Brent (DR)	William Branch Giles (DR)	17DR, 6F	James Madison/ Elbridge Gerry (DR) ✓
1815	Wilson Cary Nicholas (DR)	Philip N. Nicholas (DR)	[?]	[?]	James Barbour (DR)	vacant	19DR, 4F	James Madison/ Elbridge Gerry (DR) ✓
1816	Wilson Cary Nicholas (DR)	Philip N. Nicholas (DR)	[?]	[?]	James Barbour (DR)	Armistead Thomson Mason (DR)	19DR, 4F	James Monroe/ Daniel D. Tompkins (DR) ✓
1817	James Patton Preston (DR)	Philip N. Nicholas (DR)	[?]	DR majority	James Barbour (DR)	John Wayles Eppes (DR)	20DR, 3F	James Monroe/ Daniel D. Tompkins (DR) ✓
1818	James Patton Preston (DR)	Philip N. Nicholas (DR)	[?]	DR majority	James Barbour (DR)	John Wayles Eppes (DR)	20DR, 3F	James Monroe/ Daniel D. Tompkins (DR) ✓
1819	James Patton Preston (DR)	Philip N. Nicholas (DR)	[?]	DR majority	James Barbour (DR)	John Wayles Eppes (DR)	20DR, 3F	James Monroe/ Daniel D. Tompkins (DR) ✓
1820	Thomas Mann Randolph Jr. (DR)	John Robertson (DR)	[?]	DR majority	James Barbour (DR)	James Pleasants (DR)	20DR, 3F	James Monroe/ Daniel D. Tompkins (DR) ✓
1820	Thomas Mann Randolph Jr. (DR)	John Robertson (DR)	[?]	DR majority	James Barbour (DR)	James Pleasants (DR)	21DR, 2F	James Monroe/ Daniel D. Tompkins (DR) ✓
1821	Thomas Mann Randolph Jr. (DR)	John Robertson (DR)	[?]	DR majority	James Barbour (DR)	James Pleasants (DR)	21DR, 2F	James Monroe/ Daniel D. Tompkins (DR) ✓
1822	Thomas Mann Randolph Jr. (DR)	John Robertson (DR)	[?]	DR majority	James Barbour (DR)	James Pleasants (DR)	21DR, 2F	James Monroe/ Daniel D. Tompkins (DR) ✓
1823	James Pleasants (DR)	John Robertson (DR)	[?]	DR majority	James Barbour (DR)	John Taylor of Caroline (DR)	21DR, 1F	James Monroe/ Daniel D. Tompkins (DR) ✓
1824	James Pleasants (DR)	John Robertson (DR)	[?]	J majority	James Barbour (DR)	John Taylor of Caroline (DR)	21DR, 1F	William H. Crawford/ John C. Calhoun (DR) ✗
1824	James Pleasants (DR)	John Robertson (DR)	[?]	J majority	James Barbour (DR)	vacant	21DR, 1F	William H. Crawford/ John C. Calhoun (DR) ✗
1825	James Pleasants (DR)	John Robertson (DR)	[?]	J majority	James Barbour (J)	Littleton Waller Tazewell (DR)	15J, 7NR	William H. Crawford/ John C. Calhoun (DR) ✗
1825	James Pleasants (DR)	John Robertson (DR)	[?]	J majority	vacant	Littleton Waller Tazewell (J)	15J, 7NR	William H. Crawford/ John C. Calhoun (DR) ✗
1826	John Tyler (DR) (Note: Resigned to take an elected seat in the U.S. Senate.)	John Robertson (DR)	[?]	J majority	John Randolph of Roanoke (J)	Littleton Waller Tazewell (J)	15J, 7NR	William H. Crawford/ John C. Calhoun (DR) ✗
1827	William Branch Giles (D)	John Robertson (DR)	[?]	J majority	John Tyler (J)	Littleton Waller Tazewell (J)	16J, 6NR	William H. Crawford/ John C. Calhoun (DR) ✗
1828	William Branch Giles (D)	John Robertson (DR)	[?]	J majority	John Tyler (J)	Littleton Waller Tazewell (J)	16J, 6NR	Andrew Jackson/ John C. Calhoun (D) ✓
1829	William Branch Giles (D)	John Robertson (DR)	[?]	J majority	John Tyler (J)	Littleton Waller Tazewell (J)	16J, 6NR	Andrew Jackson/ John C. Calhoun (D) ✓
1830	John Floyd (D)	John Robertson (DR)	[?]	J majority	John Tyler (J)	Littleton Waller Tazewell (J)	17J, 5NR	Andrew Jackson/ John C. Calhoun (D) ✓
1831	John Floyd (D)	John Robertson (DR)	32NP	134NP	John Tyler (J)	Littleton Waller Tazewell (J)	17J, 5NR	Andrew Jackson/ John C. Calhoun (D) ✓
1832	John Floyd (D)	John Robertson (DR)	32NP	134NP	John Tyler (J)	Littleton Waller Tazewell (J)	18J, 4NR	Andrew Jackson/ Martin Van Buren (D) ✓
1832	John Floyd (D)	John Robertson (DR)	32NP	134NP	John Tyler (J)	vacant	18J, 4NR	Andrew Jackson/ Martin Van Buren (D) ✓
1833	John Floyd (D)	John Robertson (DR)	32NP	134NP	John Tyler (NR)	William Cabell Rives (J)	14J, 7NR	Andrew Jackson/ Martin Van Buren (D) ✓
1834	Littleton Waller Tazewell (D)	Sidney S. Baxter (W)	32NP	134NP	John Tyler (NR)	Benjamin W. Leigh (NR)	16J, 8NR	Andrew Jackson/ Martin Van Buren (D) ✓
1835	Littleton Waller Tazewell (D)	Sidney S. Baxter (W)	20D, 12W	73W, 61D (Note: Re-elected a Democratic speaker.)	John Tyler (NR)	Benjamin W. Leigh (NR)	17J, 4NR	Andrew Jackson/ Martin Van Buren (D) ✓
1836	Wyndham Robertson (W)	Sidney S. Baxter (W)	18D, 14W	74D, 60W	William Cabell Rives (J)	Benjamin W. Leigh (NR)	17J, 4NR	Martin Van Buren/ Richard Mentor Johnson (D) ✓
1836	Wyndham Robertson (W)	Sidney S. Baxter (W)	18D, 14W	74D, 60W	William Cabell Rives (J)	vacant	17J, 4NR	Martin Van Buren/ Richard Mentor Johnson (D) ✓
1837	David Campbell (D)	Sidney S. Baxter (W)	21D, 11W	77D, 55W, 2?	William Cabell Rives (J)	Richard E. Parker (J)	15D, 6W	Martin Van Buren/ Richard Mentor Johnson (D) ✓
1837	David Campbell (D)	Sidney S. Baxter (W)	21D, 11W	77D, 55W, 2?	William Cabell Rives (D)	Richard E. Parker (D)	15D, 6W	Martin Van Buren/ Richard Mentor Johnson (D) ✓
1837	David Campbell (D)	Sidney S. Baxter (W)	21D, 11W	77D, 55W, 2?	William Cabell Rives (D)	William H. Roane (D)	15D, 6W	Martin Van Buren/ Richard Mentor Johnson (D) ✓
1838	David Campbell (D)	Sidney S. Baxter (W)	20D, 12W	85D, 47W, 2?	William Cabell Rives (D)	William H. Roane (D)	15D, 6W	Martin Van Buren/ Richard Mentor Johnson (D) ✓
1839	David Campbell (D)	Sidney S. Baxter (W)	19D, 10W, 3Con	72W, 51D, 11Con	vacant	William H. Roane (D)	12D, 7W, 2Con	Martin Van Buren/ Richard Mentor Johnson (D) ✓
1840	Thomas Walker Gilmer (W)	Sidney S. Baxter (W)	17D, 12W, 3Con	68W, 56D, 10Con	vacant	William H. Roane (D)	11D, 8W, 2Con	Martin Van Buren/ Richard Mentor Johnson (D) ✗
1841	John M. Patton (W)	Sidney S. Baxter (W)	17D, 15W	71W, 63D	William Cabell Rives (W)	William S. Archer (W)	11W, 10D	Martin Van Buren/ Richard Mentor Johnson (D) ✗
1841	John Rutherfoord (D)	Sidney S. Baxter (W)	17D, 15W	71W, 63D	William Cabell Rives (W)	William S. Archer (W)	11W, 10D	Martin Van Buren/ Richard Mentor Johnson (D) ✗
1842	John Munford Gregory (W)	Sidney S. Baxter (W)	17W, 15D	68W, 66D	William Cabell Rives (W)	William S. Archer (W)	11W, 10D	Martin Van Buren/ Richard Mentor Johnson (D) ✗
1843	James McDowell (D)	Sidney S. Baxter (W)	20D, 12W	82D, 52W	William Cabell Rives (W)	William S. Archer (W)	12D, 3W	Martin Van Buren/ Richard Mentor Johnson (D) ✗
1844	James McDowell (D)	Sidney S. Baxter (W)	20D, 12W	75D, 59W	William Cabell Rives (W)	William S. Archer (W)	11D, 4W	James K. Polk/ George M. Dallas (D) ✓
1845	James McDowell (D)	Sidney S. Baxter (W)	21D, 11W	73W, 61D	vacant	William S. Archer (W)	13D, 2W	James K. Polk/ George M. Dallas (D) ✓
1846	William Smith (D)	Sidney S. Baxter (W)	21D, 11W	79D, 55W	Isaac S. Pennybacker (D)	William S. Archer (W)	13D, 2W	James K. Polk/ George M. Dallas (D) ✓
1847	William Smith (D)	Sidney S. Baxter (W)	20D, 12W	72D, 60W, 2?	James M. Mason (D)	Robert M. T. Hunter (D)	9D, 6W	James K. Polk/ George M. Dallas (D) ✓
1848	William Smith (D)	Sidney S. Baxter (W)	21D, 11W	71D, 63W	James M. Mason (D)	Robert M. T. Hunter (D)	9D, 6W	Lewis Cass/ William O. Butler (D) ✗
1849	John B. Floyd (D)	Sidney S. Baxter (W)	D majority	75D, 60W	James M. Mason (D)	Robert M. T. Hunter (D)	14D, 1W	Lewis Cass/ William O. Butler (D) ✗
1850	John B. Floyd (D)	Sidney S. Baxter (W)	21D, 11W	80D, 55W	James M. Mason (D)	Robert M. T. Hunter (D)	13D, 2W	Lewis Cass/ William O. Butler (D) ✗
1851	John B. Floyd (D)	Sidney S. Baxter (W)	21D, 11W	76D, 59W	James M. Mason (D)	Robert M. T. Hunter (D)	13D, 2W	Lewis Cass/ William O. Butler (D) ✗

== 1852–present ==
Year	Executive offices				General Assembly		United States Congress			Electoral votes
Year	Governor	Lieutenant Governor		Attorney General	State Senate	State House	U.S. Senator (Class I)	U.S. Senator (Class II)	U.S. House	Electoral votes
1852	Joseph Johnson (D) (Note: First popularly-elected governor.)	Shelton Leake (D)		Willis Perry Bocock (D)	34D, 16W	89D, 61W, 2?	James M. Mason (D)	Robert M. T. Hunter (D)	13D, 2W	Franklin Pierce/ William R. King (D) ✓
1853	Joseph Johnson (D)	Shelton Leake (D)		Willis Perry Bocock (D)	34D, 16W	89D, 61W, 2?	James M. Mason (D)	Robert M. T. Hunter (D)	12D, 1W	Franklin Pierce/ William R. King (D) ✓
1854	Joseph Johnson (D)	Shelton Leake (D)		Willis Perry Bocock (D)	D majority	D majority	James M. Mason (D)	Robert M. T. Hunter (D)	12D, 1W	Franklin Pierce/ William R. King (D) ✓
1855	Joseph Johnson (D)	Shelton Leake (D)		Willis Perry Bocock (D)	D majority	D majority	James M. Mason (D)	Robert M. T. Hunter (D)	12D, 1U	Franklin Pierce/ William R. King (D) ✓
1856	Henry A. Wise (D)	Elisha W. McComas (D)		Willis Perry Bocock (D)	D majority	96D, 56W	James M. Mason (D)	Robert M. T. Hunter (D)	12D, 1U	James Buchanan/ John C. Breckinridge (D) ✓
1857	Henry A. Wise (D)	William Lowther Jackson (D)		J. Randolph Tucker (D)	D majority	96D, 56W	James M. Mason (D)	Robert M. T. Hunter (D)	13D	James Buchanan/ John C. Breckinridge (D) ✓
1858	Henry A. Wise (D)	William Lowther Jackson (D)		J. Randolph Tucker (D)	D majority	D majority	James M. Mason (D)	Robert M. T. Hunter (D)	13D	James Buchanan/ John C. Breckinridge (D) ✓
1859	Henry A. Wise (D)	William Lowther Jackson (D)		J. Randolph Tucker (D)	D majority	D majority	James M. Mason (D)	Robert M. T. Hunter (D)	8D, 5ID	James Buchanan/ John C. Breckinridge (D) ✓
1860	John Letcher (D)	Robert Latane Montague (D)		J. Randolph Tucker (D)	D majority	D majority	James M. Mason (D)	Robert M. T. Hunter (D)	8D, 5ID	John Bell/ Edward Everett (CU) ✗
1861	John Letcher (D)	Robert Latane; Montague (D)	Daniel; Polsley (R) (Note: Held office in the Restored Government of Virginia.)	J. Randolph Tucker (D)	D majority	D majority	James M. Mason (D)	Robert M. T. Hunter (D)	4U, 9 vac.	John Bell/ Edward Everett (CU) ✗
1861	John Letcher (D)	Robert Latane; Montague (D)	Daniel; Polsley (R)	J. Randolph Tucker (D)	D majority	D majority	Waitman T. Willey (U)	John S. Carlile (U)	4U, 9 vac.	John Bell/ Edward Everett (CU) ✗
1862	John Letcher (D)	Robert Latane; Montague (D)	Daniel; Polsley (R)	J. Randolph Tucker (D)	American Civil War		Waitman T. Willey (U)	John S. Carlile (U)	5U, 8 vac.	John Bell/ Edward Everett (CU) ✗
1863	John Letcher (D)	Robert Latane; Montague (D)	Leland C. P. Cowper (R)	J. Randolph Tucker (D)	American Civil War		Lemuel J. Bowden (U)	John S. Carlile (U)	vacant during Civil War	John Bell/ Edward Everett (CU) ✗
1864	William Smith (D)	Samuel Price (D)	Leland C. P. Cowper (R)	J. Randolph Tucker (D)	American Civil War		vacant	John S. Carlile (U)	vacant during Civil War	no Electors counted
1865	William Smith (D)	Leopold C. P. Cowper (R)		Thomas Russell Bowden (R)	American Civil War		vacant during Reconstruction			no Electors counted
1865	Francis Harrison Pierpont (R) (Note: Unelected military governor.)	Leopold C. P. Cowper (R)		Thomas Russell Bowden (R)	American Civil War		vacant during Reconstruction			no Electors counted
1866	Francis Harrison Pierpont (R)	Leopold C. P. Cowper (R)		Thomas Russell Bowden (R)	50NP	152NP (Note: Elected John Brown Baldwin, a Conservative, as Speaker.)	vacant during Reconstruction			no Electors counted
1867	Francis Harrison Pierpont (R)	Leopold C. P. Cowper (R)		Thomas Russell Bowden (R)	50NP	152NP	vacant during Reconstruction			no Electors counted
1868	Francis Harrison Pierpont (R)	Leopold C. P. Cowper (R)		Thomas Russell Bowden (R)	50NP	152NP	vacant during Reconstruction			no Electors counted
1868	Henry H. Wells (R)	Leopold C. P. Cowper (R)		Thomas Russell Bowden (R)	50NP	152NP	vacant during Reconstruction			no Electors counted
1869	Henry H. Wells (R)	John F. Lewis (R)		Thomas Russell Bowden (R)	50NP	152NP	vacant during Reconstruction		5Con, 3R	no Electors counted
1869	Gilbert C. Walker (R) (Note: Unelected military governor, then elected in his own right.)	John F. Lewis (R)		Charles Whittlesey (R)	50NP	152NP	vacant during Reconstruction		5Con, 3R	no Electors counted
1870	Gilbert C. Walker (R)	John Lawrence Marye Jr. (Con)		James Craig Taylor (Con)	30D, 13R	97D, 41R	John F. Lewis (R)	John W. Johnston (D)	5Con, 3R	no Electors counted
1871	Gilbert C. Walker (R)	John Lawrence Marye Jr. (Con)		James Craig Taylor (Con)	30D, 13R	97D, 41R	John F. Lewis (R)	John W. Johnston (D)	4D, 3R, 1Con	no Electors counted
1872	Gilbert C. Walker (R)	John Lawrence Marye Jr. (Con)		James Craig Taylor (Con)	33D, 10R	99D, 33R	John F. Lewis (R)	John W. Johnston (D)	4D, 3R, 1Con	Ulysses S. Grant/ Henry Wilson (R) ✓
1873	Gilbert C. Walker (R)	John Lawrence Marye Jr. (Con)		James Craig Taylor (Con)	33D, 10R	99D, 33R	John F. Lewis (R)	John W. Johnston (D)	5D, 4R	Ulysses S. Grant/ Henry Wilson (R) ✓
1874	James L. Kemper (D)	Robert E. Withers (D)		Raleigh T. Daniel (Con)	34D, 9R	99D, 32R, 1I	John F. Lewis (R)	John W. Johnston (D)	5R, 4D	Ulysses S. Grant/ Henry Wilson (R) ✓
1875	James L. Kemper (D)	Henry Wirtz Thomas (D)		Raleigh T. Daniel (Con)	34D, 9R	99D, 32R, 1I	Robert E. Withers (D)	John W. Johnston (D)	8D, 1R	Ulysses S. Grant/ Henry Wilson (R) ✓
1876	James L. Kemper (D)	Henry Wirtz Thomas (D)		Raleigh T. Daniel (Con)	37D, 6R	101D, 25R, 1I, 5?	Robert E. Withers (D)	John W. Johnston (D)	8D, 1R	Samuel J. Tilden/ Thomas A. Hendricks (D) ✗
1877	James L. Kemper (D)	Henry Wirtz Thomas (D)		Raleigh T. Daniel (Con)	37D, 6R	101D, 25R, 1I, 5?	Robert E. Withers (D)	John W. Johnston (D)	8D, 1R	Samuel J. Tilden/ Thomas A. Hendricks (D) ✗
1878	Frederick W. M. Holliday (Con)	James A. Walker (D)		James G. Field (Con)	38D, 4R, 1I	102D, 21I, 9R	Robert E. Withers (D)	John W. Johnston (D)	8D, 1R	Samuel J. Tilden/ Thomas A. Hendricks (D) ✗
1879	Frederick W. M. Holliday (Con)	James A. Walker (D)		James G. Field (Con)	38D, 4R, 1I	102D, 21I, 9R	Robert E. Withers (D)	John W. Johnston (D)	8D, 1R	Samuel J. Tilden/ Thomas A. Hendricks (D) ✗
1880	Frederick W. M. Holliday (Con)	James A. Walker (D)		James G. Field (Con)	31D, 9R	83D, 17R	Robert E. Withers (D)	John W. Johnston (D)	8D, 1R	Winfield Scott Hancock/ William Hayden English (D) ✗
1881	Frederick W. M. Holliday (Con)	James A. Walker (D)		James G. Field (Con)	31D, 9R	83D, 17R	William Mahone (RA)	John W. Johnston (D)	7D, 2R	Winfield Scott Hancock/ William Hayden English (D) ✗
1882	William E. Cameron (RA)	John F. Lewis (RA)		Frank S. Blair (RA)	23RA, 17D	58RA, 42D	William Mahone (RA)	John W. Johnston (D)	7D, 2R	Winfield Scott Hancock/ William Hayden English (D) ✗
1883	William E. Cameron (RA)	John F. Lewis (RA)		Frank S. Blair (RA)	23RA, 17D	58RA, 42D	William Mahone (RA)	Harrison H. Riddleberger (RA)	5D, 5RA	Winfield Scott Hancock/ William Hayden English (D) ✗
1884	William E. Cameron (RA)	John F. Lewis (RA)		Frank S. Blair (RA)	25D, 12RA	63D, 37RA	William Mahone (RA)	Harrison H. Riddleberger (RA)	6D, 4RA	Grover Cleveland/ Thomas A. Hendricks (D) ✓
1885	William E. Cameron (RA)	John F. Lewis (RA)		Frank S. Blair (RA)	25D, 12RA	63D, 37RA	William Mahone (RA)	Harrison H. Riddleberger (RA)	8D, 2R	Grover Cleveland/ Thomas A. Hendricks (D) ✓
1886	Fitzhugh Lee (D)	John E. Massey (RA)		Rufus A. Ayers (D)	30D, 10R	70D, 30R	William Mahone (RA)	Harrison H. Riddleberger (RA)	8D, 2R	Grover Cleveland/ Thomas A. Hendricks (D) ✓
1887	Fitzhugh Lee (D)	John E. Massey (RA)		Rufus A. Ayers (D)	30D, 10R	70D, 30R	John W. Daniel (D)	Harrison H. Riddleberger (RA)	6R, 3D, 1Lab	Grover Cleveland/ Thomas A. Hendricks (D) ✓
1888	Fitzhugh Lee (D)	John E. Massey (RA)		Rufus A. Ayers (D)	26D, 14R	61D, 38R, 1I	John W. Daniel (D)	Harrison H. Riddleberger (RA)	6R, 3D, 1Lab	Grover Cleveland/ Allen G. Thurman (D) ✗
1889	Fitzhugh Lee (D)	John E. Massey (RA)		Rufus A. Ayers (D)	26D, 14R	61D, 38R, 1I	John W. Daniel (D)	John S. Barbour Jr. (D)	8D, 2R	Grover Cleveland/ Allen G. Thurman (D) ✗
1890	Philip W. McKinney (D)	James Hoge Tyler (D)		R. Taylor Scott (D)	30D, 10R	86D, 14R	John W. Daniel (D)	John S. Barbour Jr. (D)	6D, 4R	Grover Cleveland/ Allen G. Thurman (D) ✗
1891	Philip W. McKinney (D)	James Hoge Tyler (D)		R. Taylor Scott (D)	30D, 10R	86D, 14R	John W. Daniel (D)	John S. Barbour Jr. (D)	10D	Grover Cleveland/ Allen G. Thurman (D) ✗
1892	Philip W. McKinney (D)	James Hoge Tyler (D)		R. Taylor Scott (D)	39D, 1R	97D, 3R	John W. Daniel (D)	Eppa Hunton (D)	10D	Grover Cleveland/ Adlai Stevenson I (D) ✓
1893	Philip W. McKinney (D)	James Hoge Tyler (D)		R. Taylor Scott (D)	39D, 1R	97D, 3R	John W. Daniel (D)	Eppa Hunton (D)	10D	Grover Cleveland/ Adlai Stevenson I (D) ✓
1894	Charles T. O'Ferrall (D)	Robert Craig Kent (D)		R. Taylor Scott (D)	38D, 2R	90D, 10R	John W. Daniel (D)	Eppa Hunton (D)	10D	Grover Cleveland/ Adlai Stevenson I (D) ✓
1895	Charles T. O'Ferrall (D)	Robert Craig Kent (D)		R. Taylor Scott (D)	38D, 2R	90D, 10R	John W. Daniel (D)	Thomas S. Martin (D)	9D, 1R	Grover Cleveland/ Adlai Stevenson I (D) ✓
1896	Charles T. O'Ferrall (D)	Robert Craig Kent (D)		R. Taylor Scott (D)	34D, 3R, 1Cit, 1Fus, 1O	68D, 17R, 12P, 3I	John W. Daniel (D)	Thomas S. Martin (D)	8D, 2R	William Jennings Bryan/ Arthur Sewall (D) ✗
1897	Charles T. O'Ferrall (D)	Robert Craig Kent (D)		R. Taylor Scott (D)	34D, 3R, 1Cit, 1Fus, 1O	68D, 17R, 12P, 3I	John W. Daniel (D)	Thomas S. Martin (D)	8D, 2R	William Jennings Bryan/ Arthur Sewall (D) ✗
1897	Charles T. O'Ferrall (D)	Robert Craig Kent (D)		vacant	34D, 3R, 1Cit, 1Fus, 1O	68D, 17R, 12P, 3I	John W. Daniel (D)	Thomas S. Martin (D)	8D, 2R	William Jennings Bryan/ Arthur Sewall (D) ✗
1898	James Hoge Tyler (D)	Edward Echols (D)		Andrew Jackson Montague (D)	35D, 4R, 1P	95D, 4R, 1I	John W. Daniel (D)	Thomas S. Martin (D)	6D, 4R	William Jennings Bryan/ Arthur Sewall (D) ✗
1899	James Hoge Tyler (D)	Edward Echols (D)		Andrew Jackson Montague (D)	35D, 4R, 1P	95D, 4R, 1I	John W. Daniel (D)	Thomas S. Martin (D)	10D	William Jennings Bryan/ Arthur Sewall (D) ✗
1900	James Hoge Tyler (D)	Edward Echols (D)		Andrew Jackson Montague (D)	38D, 2R	93D, 7R	John W. Daniel (D)	Thomas S. Martin (D)	9D, 1R	William Jennings Bryan/ Adlai Stevenson I (D) ✗
1901	James Hoge Tyler (D)	Edward Echols (D)		Andrew Jackson Montague (D)	38D, 2R	93D, 7R	John W. Daniel (D)	Thomas S. Martin (D)	10D	William Jennings Bryan/ Adlai Stevenson I (D) ✗
1902	Andrew Jackson Montague (D)	Joseph Edward Willard (D)		William Alexander Anderson (D)	38D, 2R	93D, 7R	John W. Daniel (D)	Thomas S. Martin (D)	10D	William Jennings Bryan/ Adlai Stevenson I (D) ✗
1903	Andrew Jackson Montague (D)	Joseph Edward Willard (D)		William Alexander Anderson (D)	38D, 2R	93D, 7R	John W. Daniel (D)	Thomas S. Martin (D)	9D, 1R	William Jennings Bryan/ Adlai Stevenson I (D) ✗
1904	Andrew Jackson Montague (D)	Joseph Edward Willard (D)		William Alexander Anderson (D)	35D, 5R	86D, 14R	John W. Daniel (D)	Thomas S. Martin (D)	9D, 1R	Alton B. Parker/ Henry G. Davis (D) ✗
1905	Andrew Jackson Montague (D)	Joseph Edward Willard (D)		William Alexander Anderson (D)	35D, 5R	86D, 14R	John W. Daniel (D)	Thomas S. Martin (D)	9D, 1R	Alton B. Parker/ Henry G. Davis (D) ✗
1906	Claude A. Swanson (D)	James Taylor Ellyson (D)		William Alexander Anderson (D)	35D, 5R	86D, 14R	John W. Daniel (D)	Thomas S. Martin (D)	9D, 1R	Alton B. Parker/ Henry G. Davis (D) ✗
1907	Claude A. Swanson (D)	James Taylor Ellyson (D)		William Alexander Anderson (D)	35D, 5R	86D, 14R	John W. Daniel (D)	Thomas S. Martin (D)	9D, 1R	Alton B. Parker/ Henry G. Davis (D) ✗
1908	Claude A. Swanson (D)	James Taylor Ellyson (D)		William Alexander Anderson (D)	35D, 5R	86D, 14R	John W. Daniel (D)	Thomas S. Martin (D)	9D, 1R	William Jennings Bryan/ John W. Kern (D) ✗
1909	Claude A. Swanson (D)	James Taylor Ellyson (D)		William Alexander Anderson (D)	35D, 5R	86D, 14R	John W. Daniel (D)	Thomas S. Martin (D)	9D, 1R	William Jennings Bryan/ John W. Kern (D) ✗
1910	William Hodges Mann (D)	James Taylor Ellyson (D)		Samuel Walker Williams (D)	35D, 5R	86D, 14R	John W. Daniel (D)	Thomas S. Martin (D)	9D, 1R	William Jennings Bryan/ John W. Kern (D) ✗
1910	William Hodges Mann (D)	James Taylor Ellyson (D)		Samuel Walker Williams (D)	35D, 5R	86D, 14R	Claude A. Swanson (D)	Thomas S. Martin (D)	9D, 1R	William Jennings Bryan/ John W. Kern (D) ✗
1911	William Hodges Mann (D)	James Taylor Ellyson (D)		Samuel Walker Williams (D)	35D, 5R	86D, 14R	Claude A. Swanson (D)	Thomas S. Martin (D)	9D, 1R	William Jennings Bryan/ John W. Kern (D) ✗
1912	William Hodges Mann (D)	James Taylor Ellyson (D)		Samuel Walker Williams (D)	35D, 5R	90D, 10R	Claude A. Swanson (D)	Thomas S. Martin (D)	9D, 1R	Woodrow Wilson/ Thomas R. Marshall (D) ✓
1913	William Hodges Mann (D)	James Taylor Ellyson (D)		Samuel Walker Williams (D)	35D, 5R	90D, 10R	Claude A. Swanson (D)	Thomas S. Martin (D)	9D, 1R	Woodrow Wilson/ Thomas R. Marshall (D) ✓
1914	Henry Carter Stuart (D)	James Taylor Ellyson (D)		John Garland Pollard (D)	35D, 5R	92D, 8R	Claude A. Swanson (D)	Thomas S. Martin (D)	9D, 1R	Woodrow Wilson/ Thomas R. Marshall (D) ✓
1915	Henry Carter Stuart (D)	James Taylor Ellyson (D)		John Garland Pollard (D)	35D, 5R	92D, 8R	Claude A. Swanson (D)	Thomas S. Martin (D)	9D, 1R	Woodrow Wilson/ Thomas R. Marshall (D) ✓
1916	Henry Carter Stuart (D)	James Taylor Ellyson (D)		John Garland Pollard (D)	36D, 4R	88D, 12R	Claude A. Swanson (D)	Thomas S. Martin (D)	9D, 1R	Woodrow Wilson/ Thomas R. Marshall (D) ✓
1917	Henry Carter Stuart (D)	James Taylor Ellyson (D)		John Garland Pollard (D)	36D, 4R	88D, 12R	Claude A. Swanson (D)	Thomas S. Martin (D)	9D, 1R	Woodrow Wilson/ Thomas R. Marshall (D) ✓
1918	Westmoreland Davis (D)	Benjamin Franklin Buchanan (D)		John R. Saunders (D)	36D, 4R	88D, 12R	Claude A. Swanson (D)	Thomas S. Martin (D)	9D, 1R	Woodrow Wilson/ Thomas R. Marshall (D) ✓
1919	Westmoreland Davis (D)	Benjamin Franklin Buchanan (D)		John R. Saunders (D)	36D, 4R	88D, 12R	Claude A. Swanson (D)	Thomas S. Martin (D)	9D, 1R	Woodrow Wilson/ Thomas R. Marshall (D) ✓
1920	Westmoreland Davis (D)	Benjamin Franklin Buchanan (D)		John R. Saunders (D)	34D, 6R	88D, 12R	Claude A. Swanson (D)	Carter Glass (D)	9D, 1R	James M. Cox/ Franklin D. Roosevelt (D) ✗
1921	Westmoreland Davis (D)	Benjamin Franklin Buchanan (D)		John R. Saunders (D)	34D, 6R	88D, 12R	Claude A. Swanson (D)	Carter Glass (D)	9D, 1R	James M. Cox/ Franklin D. Roosevelt (D) ✗
1922	E. Lee Trinkle (D)	Junius Edgar West (D)		John R. Saunders (D)	34D, 6R	95D, 5R	Claude A. Swanson (D)	Carter Glass (D)	8D, 2R	James M. Cox/ Franklin D. Roosevelt (D) ✗
1923	E. Lee Trinkle (D)	Junius Edgar West (D)		John R. Saunders (D)	34D, 6R	95D, 5R	Claude A. Swanson (D)	Carter Glass (D)	10D	James M. Cox/ Franklin D. Roosevelt (D) ✗
1924	E. Lee Trinkle (D)	Junius Edgar West (D)		John R. Saunders (D)	39D, 1R	97D, 3R	Claude A. Swanson (D)	Carter Glass (D)	10D	John W. Davis/ Charles W. Bryan (D) ✗
1925	E. Lee Trinkle (D)	Junius Edgar West (D)		John R. Saunders (D)	39D, 1R	97D, 3R	Claude A. Swanson (D)	Carter Glass (D)	10D	John W. Davis/ Charles W. Bryan (D) ✗
1926	Harry F. Byrd (D)	Junius Edgar West (D)		John R. Saunders (D)	39D, 1R	95D, 5R	Claude A. Swanson (D)	Carter Glass (D)	10D	John W. Davis/ Charles W. Bryan (D) ✗
1927	Harry F. Byrd (D)	Junius Edgar West (D)		John R. Saunders (D)	39D, 1R	95D, 5R	Claude A. Swanson (D)	Carter Glass (D)	10D	John W. Davis/ Charles W. Bryan (D) ✗
1928	Harry F. Byrd (D)	Junius Edgar West (D)		John R. Saunders (D)	38D, 2R	93D, 7R	Claude A. Swanson (D)	Carter Glass (D)	10D	Herbert Hoover/ Charles Curtis (R) ✓
1929	Harry F. Byrd (D)	Junius Edgar West (D)		John R. Saunders (D)	38D, 2R	93D, 7R	Claude A. Swanson (D)	Carter Glass (D)	7D, 3R	Herbert Hoover/ Charles Curtis (R) ✓
1930	John Garland Pollard (D)	James Hubert Price (D)		John R. Saunders (D)	38D, 2R	95D, 5R	Claude A. Swanson (D)	Carter Glass (D)	7D, 3R	Herbert Hoover/ Charles Curtis (R) ✓
1931	John Garland Pollard (D)	James Hubert Price (D)		John R. Saunders (D)	38D, 2R	95D, 5R	Claude A. Swanson (D)	Carter Glass (D)	9D, 1R	Herbert Hoover/ Charles Curtis (R) ✓
1932	John Garland Pollard (D)	James Hubert Price (D)		John R. Saunders (D)	38D, 2R	95D, 5R	Claude A. Swanson (D)	Carter Glass (D)	9D, 1R	Franklin D. Roosevelt/ John Nance Garner (D) ✓
1933	John Garland Pollard (D)	James Hubert Price (D)		John R. Saunders (D)	38D, 2R	95D, 5R	Harry F. Byrd (D)	Carter Glass (D)	9D	Franklin D. Roosevelt/ John Nance Garner (D) ✓
1934	George C. Peery (D)	James Hubert Price (D)		John R. Saunders (D)	38D, 2R	93D, 7R	Harry F. Byrd (D)	Carter Glass (D)	9D	Franklin D. Roosevelt/ John Nance Garner (D) ✓
1934	George C. Peery (D)	James Hubert Price (D)		Abram Penn Staples (D) (Note: Initially appointed to fill a vacancy, later elected in his own right. Resigned to become judge on the Virginia Supreme Court of Appeals.)	38D, 2R	93D, 7R	Harry F. Byrd (D)	Carter Glass (D)	9D	Franklin D. Roosevelt/ John Nance Garner (D) ✓
1935	George C. Peery (D)	James Hubert Price (D)		Abram Penn Staples (D)	38D, 2R	93D, 7R	Harry F. Byrd (D)	Carter Glass (D)	9D	Franklin D. Roosevelt/ John Nance Garner (D) ✓
1936	George C. Peery (D)	James Hubert Price (D)		Abram Penn Staples (D)	38D, 2R	93D, 7R	Harry F. Byrd (D)	Carter Glass (D)	9D	Franklin D. Roosevelt/ John Nance Garner (D) ✓
1937	George C. Peery (D)	James Hubert Price (D)		Abram Penn Staples (D)	38D, 2R	93D, 7R	Harry F. Byrd (D)	Carter Glass (D)	9D	Franklin D. Roosevelt/ John Nance Garner (D) ✓
1938	James Hubert Price (D)	Saxon W. Holt (D)		Abram Penn Staples (D)	38D, 2R	93D, 7R	Harry F. Byrd (D)	Carter Glass (D)	9D	Franklin D. Roosevelt/ John Nance Garner (D) ✓
1939	James Hubert Price (D)	Saxon W. Holt (D)		Abram Penn Staples (D)	38D, 2R	93D, 7R	Harry F. Byrd (D)	Carter Glass (D)	9D	Franklin D. Roosevelt/ John Nance Garner (D) ✓
1940	James Hubert Price (D)	Saxon W. Holt (D)		Abram Penn Staples (D)	38D, 2R	97D, 3R	Harry F. Byrd (D)	Carter Glass (D)	9D	Franklin D. Roosevelt/ Henry A. Wallace (D) ✓
1941	James Hubert Price (D)	vacant		Abram Penn Staples (D)	38D, 2R	97D, 3R	Harry F. Byrd (D)	Carter Glass (D)	9D	Franklin D. Roosevelt/ Henry A. Wallace (D) ✓
1942	Colgate Darden (D)	William M. Tuck (D)		Abram Penn Staples (D)	38D, 2R	97D, 3R	Harry F. Byrd (D)	Carter Glass (D)	9D	Franklin D. Roosevelt/ Henry A. Wallace (D) ✓
1943	Colgate Darden (D)	William M. Tuck (D)		Abram Penn Staples (D)	38D, 2R	97D, 3R	Harry F. Byrd (D)	Carter Glass (D)	9D	Franklin D. Roosevelt/ Henry A. Wallace (D) ✓
1944	Colgate Darden (D)	William M. Tuck (D)		Abram Penn Staples (D)	37D, 3R	94D, 6R	Harry F. Byrd (D)	Carter Glass (D)	9D	Franklin D. Roosevelt/ Harry S. Truman (D) ✓
1945	Colgate Darden (D)	William M. Tuck (D)		Abram Penn Staples (D)	37D, 3R	94D, 6R	Harry F. Byrd (D)	Carter Glass (D)	9D	Franklin D. Roosevelt/ Harry S. Truman (D) ✓
1946	William M. Tuck (D)	Lewis Preston Collins II (D)		Abram Penn Staples (D)	37D, 3R	93D, 7R	Harry F. Byrd (D)	Carter Glass (D)	9D	Franklin D. Roosevelt/ Harry S. Truman (D) ✓
1946	William M. Tuck (D)	Lewis Preston Collins II (D)		Abram Penn Staples (D)	37D, 3R	93D, 7R	Harry F. Byrd (D)	Thomas G. Burch (D)	9D	Franklin D. Roosevelt/ Harry S. Truman (D) ✓
1947	William M. Tuck (D)	Lewis Preston Collins II (D)		Harvey B. Apperson (D) (Note: Appointed by governor to fill vacancy.)	37D, 3R	93D, 7R	Harry F. Byrd (D)	A. Willis Robertson (D)	9D	Franklin D. Roosevelt/ Harry S. Truman (D) ✓
1948	William M. Tuck (D)	Lewis Preston Collins II (D)		J. Lindsay Almond (D) (Note: Resigned to run for governor.)	38D, 2R	93D, 7R	Harry F. Byrd (D)	A. Willis Robertson (D)	9D	Harry S. Truman/ Alben W. Barkley (D) ✓
1949	William M. Tuck (D)	Lewis Preston Collins II (D)		J. Lindsay Almond (D)	38D, 2R	93D, 7R	Harry F. Byrd (D)	A. Willis Robertson (D)	8D	Harry S. Truman/ Alben W. Barkley (D) ✓
1950	John S. Battle (D)	Lewis Preston Collins II (D)		J. Lindsay Almond (D)	38D, 2R	94D, 6R	Harry F. Byrd (D)	A. Willis Robertson (D)	9D	Harry S. Truman/ Alben W. Barkley (D) ✓
1951	John S. Battle (D)	Lewis Preston Collins II (D)		J. Lindsay Almond (D)	38D, 2R	94D, 6R	Harry F. Byrd (D)	A. Willis Robertson (D)	9D	Harry S. Truman/ Alben W. Barkley (D) ✓
1952	John S. Battle (D)	Allie Edward Stakes; Stephens (D) (Note: Initially elected in a special election to complete Collins's term.)		J. Lindsay Almond (D)	37D, 3R	94D, 6R	Harry F. Byrd (D)	A. Willis Robertson (D)	9D	Dwight D. Eisenhower/ Richard Nixon (R) ✓
1953	John S. Battle (D)	Allie Edward Stakes; Stephens (D)		J. Lindsay Almond (D)	37D, 3R	94D, 6R	Harry F. Byrd (D)	A. Willis Robertson (D)	7D, 3R	Dwight D. Eisenhower/ Richard Nixon (R) ✓
1954	Thomas B. Stanley (D)	Allie Edward Stakes; Stephens (D)		J. Lindsay Almond (D)	37D, 3R	94D, 6R	Harry F. Byrd (D)	A. Willis Robertson (D)	7D, 3R	Dwight D. Eisenhower/ Richard Nixon (R) ✓
1955	Thomas B. Stanley (D)	Allie Edward Stakes; Stephens (D)		J. Lindsay Almond (D)	37D, 3R	94D, 6R	Harry F. Byrd (D)	A. Willis Robertson (D)	8D, 2R	Dwight D. Eisenhower/ Richard Nixon (R) ✓
1956	Thomas B. Stanley (D)	Allie Edward Stakes; Stephens (D)		J. Lindsay Almond (D)	37D, 3R	94D, 6R	Harry F. Byrd (D)	A. Willis Robertson (D)	8D, 2R	Dwight D. Eisenhower/ Richard Nixon (R) ✓
1957	Thomas B. Stanley (D)	Allie Edward Stakes; Stephens (D)		Kenneth Cartwright Patty (D)	37D, 3R	94D, 6R	Harry F. Byrd (D)	A. Willis Robertson (D)	8D, 2R	Dwight D. Eisenhower/ Richard Nixon (R) ✓
1958	J. Lindsay Almond (D)	Allie Edward Stakes; Stephens (D)		Albertis Harrison (D)	37D, 3R	94D, 6R	Harry F. Byrd (D)	A. Willis Robertson (D)	8D, 2R	Dwight D. Eisenhower/ Richard Nixon (R) ✓
1959	J. Lindsay Almond (D)	Allie Edward Stakes; Stephens (D)		Albertis Harrison (D)	37D, 3R	94D, 6R	Harry F. Byrd (D)	A. Willis Robertson (D)	8D, 2R	Dwight D. Eisenhower/ Richard Nixon (R) ✓
1960	J. Lindsay Almond (D)	Allie Edward Stakes; Stephens (D)		Albertis Harrison (D)	38D, 2R	96D, 4R	Harry F. Byrd (D)	A. Willis Robertson (D)	8D, 2R	Richard Nixon/ Henry Cabot Lodge Jr. (R) ✗
1961	J. Lindsay Almond (D)	Allie Edward Stakes; Stephens (D)		Frederick Thomas Gray (D)	38D, 2R	96D, 4R	Harry F. Byrd (D)	A. Willis Robertson (D)	8D, 2R	Richard Nixon/ Henry Cabot Lodge Jr. (R) ✗
1962	Albertis Harrison (D)	Mills Godwin (D)		Robert Young Button (D)	38D, 2R	94D, 5R, 1I	Harry F. Byrd (D)	A. Willis Robertson (D)	8D, 2R	Richard Nixon/ Henry Cabot Lodge Jr. (R) ✗
1963	Albertis Harrison (D)	Mills Godwin (D)		Robert Young Button (D)	38D, 2R	94D, 5R, 1I	Harry F. Byrd (D)	A. Willis Robertson (D)	8D, 2R	Richard Nixon/ Henry Cabot Lodge Jr. (R) ✗
1964	Albertis Harrison (D)	Mills Godwin (D)		Robert Young Button (D)	37D, 3R	89D, 11R	Harry F. Byrd (D)	A. Willis Robertson (D)	8D, 2R	Lyndon B. Johnson/ Hubert Humphrey (D) ✓
1965	Albertis Harrison (D)	Mills Godwin (D)		Robert Young Button (D)	37D, 3R	89D, 11R	Harry F. Byrd (D)	A. Willis Robertson (D)	8D, 2R	Lyndon B. Johnson/ Hubert Humphrey (D) ✓
1966	Mills Godwin (D)	Fred G. Pollard (D)		Robert Young Button (D)	37D, 3R	87D, 12R, 1I	Harry F. Byrd Jr. (D)	A. Willis Robertson (D)	8D, 2R	Lyndon B. Johnson/ Hubert Humphrey (D) ✓
1967	Mills Godwin (D)	Fred G. Pollard (D)		Robert Young Button (D)	37D, 3R	87D, 12R, 1I	Harry F. Byrd Jr. (D)	William Spong Jr. (D)	6D, 4R	Lyndon B. Johnson/ Hubert Humphrey (D) ✓
1968	Mills Godwin (D)	Fred G. Pollard (D)		Robert Young Button (D)	34D, 6R	86D, 14R	Harry F. Byrd Jr. (D)	William Spong Jr. (D)	6D, 4R	Richard Nixon/ Spiro Agnew (R) ✓
1969	Mills Godwin (D)	Fred G. Pollard (D)		Robert Young Button (D)	34D, 6R	86D, 14R	Harry F. Byrd Jr. (D)	William Spong Jr. (D)	5D, 5R	Richard Nixon/ Spiro Agnew (R) ✓
1970	Linwood Holton (R)	J. Sargeant Reynolds (D)		Andrew P. Miller (D)	33D, 7R	75D, 24R, 1I	Harry F. Byrd Jr. (I)	William Spong Jr. (D)	5D, 5R	Richard Nixon/ Spiro Agnew (R) ✓
1971	Linwood Holton (R)	J. Sargeant Reynolds (D)		Andrew P. Miller (D)	33D, 7R	75D, 24R, 1I	Harry F. Byrd Jr. (I)	William Spong Jr. (D)	6R, 4D	Richard Nixon/ Spiro Agnew (R) ✓
1971	Linwood Holton (R)	Henry Howell (ID) (Note: Won special election to complete Reynolds's term.)		Andrew P. Miller (D)	33D, 7R	75D, 24R, 1I	Harry F. Byrd Jr. (I)	William Spong Jr. (D)	6R, 4D	Richard Nixon/ Spiro Agnew (R) ✓
1972	Linwood Holton (R)	Henry Howell (ID)		Andrew P. Miller (D)	33D, 7R	73D, 24R, 3I	Harry F. Byrd Jr. (I)	William Spong Jr. (D)	6R, 4D	Richard Nixon/ Spiro Agnew (R) ✓
1973	Linwood Holton (R)	Henry Howell (ID)		Andrew P. Miller (D)	33D, 7R	73D, 24R, 3I	Harry F. Byrd Jr. (I)	William L. Scott (R)	7R, 3D	Richard Nixon/ Spiro Agnew (R) ✓
1974	Mills Godwin (R)	John N. Dalton (R)		Andrew P. Miller (D)	34D, 6R	65D, 20R, 15I	Harry F. Byrd Jr. (I)	William L. Scott (R)	7R, 3D	Richard Nixon/ Spiro Agnew (R) ✓
1975	Mills Godwin (R)	John N. Dalton (R)		Andrew P. Miller (D)	34D, 6R	65D, 20R, 15I	Harry F. Byrd Jr. (I)	William L. Scott (R)	5R, 5D	Richard Nixon/ Spiro Agnew (R) ✓
1976	Mills Godwin (R)	John N. Dalton (R)		Andrew P. Miller (D)	35D, 5R	78D, 17R, 5I	Harry F. Byrd Jr. (I)	William L. Scott (R)	5R, 5D	Gerald Ford/ Bob Dole (R) ✗
1977	Mills Godwin (R)	John N. Dalton (R)		Anthony Francis Troy (D)	35D, 5R	78D, 17R, 5I	Harry F. Byrd Jr. (I)	William L. Scott (R)	6R, 4D	Gerald Ford/ Bob Dole (R) ✗
1978	John N. Dalton (R)	Chuck Robb (D)		Marshall Coleman (R)	34D, 6R	76D, 21R, 3I	Harry F. Byrd Jr. (I)	William L. Scott (R)	6R, 4D	Gerald Ford/ Bob Dole (R) ✗
1979	John N. Dalton (R)	Chuck Robb (D)		Marshall Coleman (R)	34D, 6R	76D, 21R, 3I	Harry F. Byrd Jr. (I)	John Warner (R)	6R, 4D	Gerald Ford/ Bob Dole (R) ✗
1980	John N. Dalton (R)	Chuck Robb (D)		Marshall Coleman (R)	31D, 9R	74D, 25R, 1I	Harry F. Byrd Jr. (I)	John Warner (R)	6R, 4D	Ronald Reagan/ George H. W. Bush (R) ✓
1981	John N. Dalton (R)	Chuck Robb (D)		Marshall Coleman (R)	31D, 9R	74D, 25R, 1I	Harry F. Byrd Jr. (I)	John Warner (R)	9R, 1D	Ronald Reagan/ George H. W. Bush (R) ✓
1982	Chuck Robb (D)	Dick Davis (D)		Gerald Baliles (D)	31D, 9R	66D, 32R, 2I	Harry F. Byrd Jr. (I)	John Warner (R)	9R, 1D	Ronald Reagan/ George H. W. Bush (R) ✓
1983	Chuck Robb (D)	Dick Davis (D)		Gerald Baliles (D)	31D, 9R	65D, 34R, 1I	Paul Trible (R)	John Warner (R)	6R, 4D	Ronald Reagan/ George H. W. Bush (R) ✓
1984	Chuck Robb (D)	Dick Davis (D)		Gerald Baliles (D)	32D, 8R	65D, 34R, 1I	Paul Trible (R)	John Warner (R)	6R, 4D	Ronald Reagan/ George H. W. Bush (R) ✓
1985	Chuck Robb (D)	Dick Davis (D)		William Broaddus (D)	32D, 8R	65D, 34R, 1I	Paul Trible (R)	John Warner (R)	6R, 4D	Ronald Reagan/ George H. W. Bush (R) ✓
1986	Gerald Baliles (D)	Douglas Wilder (D)		Mary Sue Terry (D)	32D, 8R	65D, 33R, 2I	Paul Trible (R)	John Warner (R)	6R, 4D	Ronald Reagan/ George H. W. Bush (R) ✓
1987	Gerald Baliles (D)	Douglas Wilder (D)		Mary Sue Terry (D)	32D, 8R	65D, 33R, 2I	Paul Trible (R)	John Warner (R)	5R, 5D	Ronald Reagan/ George H. W. Bush (R) ✓
1988	Gerald Baliles (D)	Douglas Wilder (D)		Mary Sue Terry (D)	30D, 10R	64D, 35R, 1I	Paul Trible (R)	John Warner (R)	5R, 5D	George H. W. Bush/ Dan Quayle (R) ✓
1989	Gerald Baliles (D)	Douglas Wilder (D)		Mary Sue Terry (D)	30D, 10R	64D, 35R, 1I	Chuck Robb (D)	John Warner (R)	5R, 5D	George H. W. Bush/ Dan Quayle (R) ✓
1990	Douglas Wilder (D)	Don Beyer (D)		Mary Sue Terry (D)	30D, 10R	59D, 40R, 1I	Chuck Robb (D)	John Warner (R)	5R, 5D	George H. W. Bush/ Dan Quayle (R) ✓
1991	Douglas Wilder (D)	Don Beyer (D)		Mary Sue Terry (D)	30D, 10R	59D, 40R, 1I	Chuck Robb (D)	John Warner (R)	6D, 4R	George H. W. Bush/ Dan Quayle (R) ✓
1992	Douglas Wilder (D)	Don Beyer (D)		Mary Sue Terry (D)	22D, 18R	58D, 41R, 1I	Chuck Robb (D)	John Warner (R)	6D, 4R	George H. W. Bush/ Dan Quayle (R) ✗
1993	Douglas Wilder (D)	Don Beyer (D)		Stephen D. Rosenthal (D)	22D, 18R	58D, 41R, 1I	Chuck Robb (D)	John Warner (R)	7D, 4R	George H. W. Bush/ Dan Quayle (R) ✗
1994	George Allen (R)	Don Beyer (D)		Jim Gilmore (R)	22D, 18R	52D, 47R, 1I	Chuck Robb (D)	John Warner (R)	7D, 4R	George H. W. Bush/ Dan Quayle (R) ✗
1995	George Allen (R)	Don Beyer (D)		Jim Gilmore (R)	22D, 18R	52D, 47R, 1I	Chuck Robb (D)	John Warner (R)	6D, 5R	George H. W. Bush/ Dan Quayle (R) ✗
1996	George Allen (R)	Don Beyer (D)		Jim Gilmore (R)	20R, 20D (Note: Republicans and Democrats negotiated a power-sharing agreement to split control of the chamber after the tie.)	52D, 47R, 1I	Chuck Robb (D)	John Warner (R)	6D, 5R	Bob Dole/ Jack Kemp (R) ✗
1997	George Allen (R)	Don Beyer (D)		Richard Cullen (R)	20R, 20D	52D, 47R, 1I	Chuck Robb (D)	John Warner (R)	6D, 5R	Bob Dole/ Jack Kemp (R) ✗
1998	Jim Gilmore (R)	John H. Hager (R)		Mark Earley (R)	21R, 19D (Note: Republicans won a special election to claim the majority in the chamber after Democrat Charles Waddell resigned his seat.)	50D, 49R, 1I (Note: The 1997 general election yielded a 51-48-1 Democrat majority. David Brickley resigned his seat right afterward, however, and a special election for District 51 was called. His seat flipped to the Republicans, and with Independent Lacey Putney siding with the Republicans, the chamber was tied. Democrats retained the Speakership through a power-sharing agreement.)	Chuck Robb (D)	John Warner (R)	6D, 5R	Bob Dole/ Jack Kemp (R) ✗
1999	Jim Gilmore (R)	John H. Hager (R)		Mark Earley (R)	21R, 19D	50D, 49R, 1I	Chuck Robb (D)	John Warner (R)	6D, 5R	Bob Dole/ Jack Kemp (R) ✗
2000	Jim Gilmore (R)	John H. Hager (R)		Mark Earley (R)	21R, 19D	52R, 47D, 1I	Chuck Robb (D)	John Warner (R)	6D, 5R	George W. Bush/ Dick Cheney (R) ✓
2001	Jim Gilmore (R)	John H. Hager (R)		Randolph A. Beales (R)	21R, 19D	52R, 47D, 1I	George Allen (R)	John Warner (R)	6R, 4D, 1I	George W. Bush/ Dick Cheney (R) ✓
2002	Mark Warner (D)	Tim Kaine (D)		Jerry Kilgore (R)	21R, 19D	64R, 34D, 2I	George Allen (R)	John Warner (R)	6R, 4D, 1I	George W. Bush/ Dick Cheney (R) ✓
2002	Mark Warner (D)	Tim Kaine (D)		Jerry Kilgore (R)	21R, 19D	64R, 34D, 2I	George Allen (R)	John Warner (R)	8R, 3D (Note: In August 2002, Goode switched parties and became a Republican.)	George W. Bush/ Dick Cheney (R) ✓
2003	Mark Warner (D)	Tim Kaine (D)		Jerry Kilgore (R)	21R, 19D	64R, 34D, 2I	George Allen (R)	John Warner (R)	8R, 3D	George W. Bush/ Dick Cheney (R) ✓
2004	Mark Warner (D)	Tim Kaine (D)		Jerry Kilgore (R)	24R, 16D	61R, 37D, 2I	George Allen (R)	John Warner (R)	8R, 3D	George W. Bush/ Dick Cheney (R) ✓
2005	Mark Warner (D)	Tim Kaine (D)		Jerry Kilgore (R)	24R, 16D	61R, 37D, 2I	George Allen (R)	John Warner (R)	8R, 3D	George W. Bush/ Dick Cheney (R) ✓
2005	Mark Warner (D)	Tim Kaine (D)		Judith Jagdmann (R) (Note: Chief deputy attorney general elected attorney general by the General Assembly.)	24R, 16D	61R, 37D, 2I	George Allen (R)	John Warner (R)	8R, 3D	George W. Bush/ Dick Cheney (R) ✓
2006	Tim Kaine (D)	Bill Bolling (R)		Bob McDonnell (R)	24R, 16D	57R, 40D, 3I	George Allen (R)	John Warner (R)	8R, 3D	George W. Bush/ Dick Cheney (R) ✓
2007	Tim Kaine (D)	Bill Bolling (R)		Bob McDonnell (R)	24R, 16D	57R, 40D, 3I	Jim Webb (D)	John Warner (R)	8R, 3D	George W. Bush/ Dick Cheney (R) ✓
2008	Tim Kaine (D)	Bill Bolling (R)		Bob McDonnell (R)	21D, 19R	54R, 44D, 2I	Jim Webb (D)	John Warner (R)	8R, 3D	Barack Obama/ Joe Biden (D) ✓
2009	Tim Kaine (D)	Bill Bolling (R)		William C. Mims (R)	21D, 19R	53R, 45D, 2I (Note: Independents caucused with Republicans.)	Jim Webb (D)	Mark Warner (D)	6D, 5R	Barack Obama/ Joe Biden (D) ✓
2010	Bob McDonnell (R)	Bill Bolling (R)		Ken Cuccinelli (R)	22D, 18R	59R, 39D, 2I	Jim Webb (D)	Mark Warner (D)	6D, 5R	Barack Obama/ Joe Biden (D) ✓
2011	Bob McDonnell (R)	Bill Bolling (R)		Ken Cuccinelli (R)	22D, 18R	59R, 39D, 2I	Jim Webb (D)	Mark Warner (D)	8R, 3D	Barack Obama/ Joe Biden (D) ✓
2012	Bob McDonnell (R)	Bill Bolling (R)		Ken Cuccinelli (R)	20R, 20D (Note: Control of Senate decided by Lieutenant Governor.)	67R, 32D, 1I	Jim Webb (D)	Mark Warner (D)	8R, 3D	Barack Obama/ Joe Biden (D) ✓
2013	Bob McDonnell (R)	Bill Bolling (R)		Ken Cuccinelli (R)	20R, 20D	67R, 32D, 1I	Tim Kaine (D)	Mark Warner (D)	8R, 3D	Barack Obama/ Joe Biden (D) ✓
2014	Terry McAuliffe (D)	Ralph Northam (D)		Mark Herring (D)	20D, 20R	68R, 32D	Tim Kaine (D)	Mark Warner (D)	8R, 3D	Barack Obama/ Joe Biden (D) ✓
2014	Terry McAuliffe (D)	Ralph Northam (D)		Mark Herring (D)	21R, 19D (Note: On June 9, 2014, Democrat Phillip Puckett resigned from the Virginia State Senate. He was replaced by Republican Ben Chafin in an August 19 special election.)	68R, 32D	Tim Kaine (D)	Mark Warner (D)	8R, 3D	Barack Obama/ Joe Biden (D) ✓
2015	Terry McAuliffe (D)	Ralph Northam (D)		Mark Herring (D)	21R, 19D	67R, 32D, 1I	Tim Kaine (D)	Mark Warner (D)	8R, 3D	Barack Obama/ Joe Biden (D) ✓
2016	Terry McAuliffe (D)	Ralph Northam (D)		Mark Herring (D)	21R, 19D	66R, 34D	Tim Kaine (D)	Mark Warner (D)	8R, 3D	Hillary Clinton/ Tim Kaine (D) ✗
2017	Terry McAuliffe (D)	Ralph Northam (D)		Mark Herring (D)	21R, 19D	66R, 34D	Tim Kaine (D)	Mark Warner (D)	7R, 4D	Hillary Clinton/ Tim Kaine (D) ✗
2018	Ralph Northam (D)	Justin Fairfax (D)		Mark Herring (D)	21R, 19D	51R, 49D	Tim Kaine (D)	Mark Warner (D)	7R, 4D	Hillary Clinton/ Tim Kaine (D) ✗
2019	Ralph Northam (D)	Justin Fairfax (D)		Mark Herring (D)	21R, 19D	51R, 49D	Tim Kaine (D)	Mark Warner (D)	7D, 4R	Hillary Clinton/ Tim Kaine (D) ✗
2020	Ralph Northam (D)	Justin Fairfax (D)		Mark Herring (D)	21D, 19R	55D, 45R	Tim Kaine (D)	Mark Warner (D)	7D, 4R	Joe Biden/ Kamala Harris (D) ✓
2021	Ralph Northam (D)	Justin Fairfax (D)		Mark Herring (D)	21D, 19R	55D, 45R	Tim Kaine (D)	Mark Warner (D)	7D, 4R	Joe Biden/ Kamala Harris (D) ✓
2022	Glenn Youngkin (R)	Winsome Earle-Sears (R)		Jason Miyares (R)	21D, 19R	52R, 48D	Tim Kaine (D)	Mark Warner (D)	7D, 4R	Joe Biden/ Kamala Harris (D) ✓
2023	Glenn Youngkin (R)	Winsome Earle-Sears (R)		Jason Miyares (R)	22D, 18R (Note: Republican State Senator Jennifer Kiggans vacated her seat after she was elected to the U.S. House of Representatives. Democrat Aaron Rouse won the special election to succeed her.)	52R, 48D	Tim Kaine (D)	Mark Warner (D)	6D, 5R	Joe Biden/ Kamala Harris (D) ✓
2024	Glenn Youngkin (R)	Winsome Earle-Sears (R)		Jason Miyares (R)	21D, 19R	51D, 49R	Tim Kaine (D)	Mark Warner (D)	6D, 5R	Kamala Harris/ Tim Walz (D) ✗
2025	Glenn Youngkin (R)	Winsome Earle-Sears (R)		Jason Miyares (R)	21D, 19R	51D, 49R	Tim Kaine (D)	Mark Warner (D)	6D, 5R	Kamala Harris/ Tim Walz (D) ✗
2026	Abigail Spanberger (D)	Ghazala Hashmi (D)		Jay Jones (D)	21D, 19R	64D, 36R	Tim Kaine (D)	Mark Warner (D)	6D, 5R	Kamala Harris/ Tim Walz (D) ✗
2027	Abigail Spanberger (D)	Ghazala Hashmi (D)		Jay Jones (D)	21D, 19R	64D, 36R	Tim Kaine (D)	Mark Warner (D)	8D, 3R	Kamala Harris/ Tim Walz (D) ✗

Key to party colors and abbreviations for members of the U.S. Congress and other politicians or officials
Alaskan Independence (AKIP) Know Nothing (KN) American Labor (AL) Anti-Jacksonian (Anti-J); National Republican (NR) Anti-Administration (AA) Anti-Masonic (Anti-M) Conservative (Con) Covenant (Cov)	Democratic (D) Democratic–Farmer–Labor (DFL) Democratic–NPL (D-NPL) Dixiecrat (Dix), States' Rights (SR) Democratic-Republican (DR) Farmer–Labor (FL) Federalist (F); Pro-Administration (PA)	Free Soil (FS) Fusion (Fus) Greenback (GB) Independence (IPM) Jacksonian (J) Liberal (Lib) Libertarian (L) National Union (NU)	Nonpartisan League (NPL) Nullifier (N) Opposition Northern (O); Opposition Southern (O) Populist (Pop) Progressive (Prog) Prohibition (Proh) Readjuster (Rea)	Republican (R) Silver (Sv) Silver Republican (SvR) Socialist (Soc) Union (U) Unconditional Union (UU) Vermont Progressive (VP) Whig (W)	Independent (I) Nonpartisan (NP)

== See also ==
- Politics of Virginia
