= 1997 Virginia gubernatorial election =

- November 4, 1997
- Turnout: 49.5% (voting eligible)
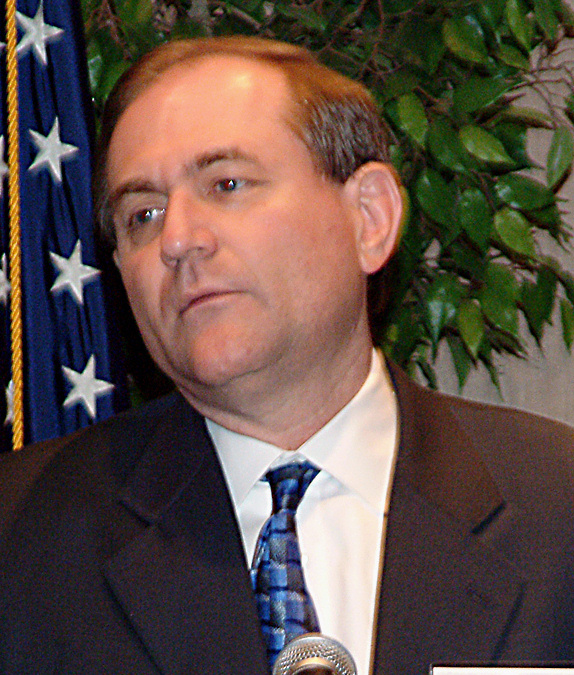

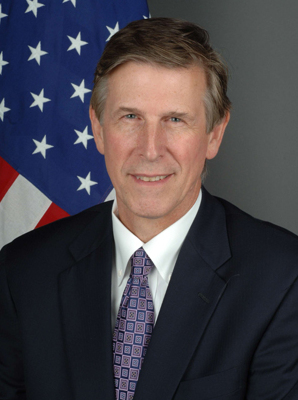
Nominee	Jim Gilmore	Don Beyer
Party	Republican	Democratic
Popular vote	969,062	738,971
Percentage	55.81%	42.56%
- Gilmore: 40–50% 50–60% 60–70% 70–80% 80–90% >90% Beyer: 40–50% 50–60% 60–70% 70–80% 80–90% >90% No data
Governor before election
George Allen
Republican
Elected Governor
Jim Gilmore
Republican

The 1997 Virginia gubernatorial election was held on November 4, 1997, to elect the next governor of Virginia. The election was held concurrently with other elections for Virginia's statewide offices, the House of Delegates, and other United States' offices. Incumbent Republican governor George Allen, was ineligible to run for re-election, as the Constitution of Virginia prohibits its governors from serving consecutive terms. The Republican candidate, Jim Gilmore, the Attorney General of Virginia defeated the Democratic nominee, Don Beyer, the incumbent Lieutenant Governor.

Coupled with Republican gains in the House of Delegates in 1999, Republicans won a trifecta in the state for the first time since 1870. As of 2026, this is the last time in which the Republicans won the governorship for two consecutive terms.

== General election ==
=== Candidates ===
- Don Beyer, Lieutenant Governor of Virginia (Democratic)
- Jim Gilmore, Attorney General of Virginia (Republican)

=== Campaign ===
Gilmore and Beyer were the two most prominent statewide officials for their parties, with Gilmore having been first elected Attorney General in 1993, and Beyer having been first elected in 1989, and re-elected in 1993, the only Democrat to win a statewide contest that year. Consequently, both candidates were seen as their respective party's heir apparent to replace term-limited Governor George Allen. The field was cleared for both candidates, allowing them time to fundraise and begin attacks on one another.

Among the earliest attacks was against Gilmore's hesitancy to resign as Attorney General to campaign for governor. Doing so was seen as tradition, and also as a way to avoid any appearance of impropriety from receiving campaign funds from companies the Attorney General's office might be involved with. Thus, Gilmore's reluctance to resign was the subject of criticism from Beyer. Ultimately, Gilmore announced his intent to resign on April 3, and his resignation became effective June 11.

Moreover, Beyer tried to attack Gilmore for his social conservatism. He attacked Gilmore for his stances and comments against abortion, in an attempt to court women voters, with whom he had an advantage. He also attacked Gilmore for his ties to Pat Robertson and the religious right, launching television ads highlighting the fact that Robertson had donated $100,000 to the Gilmore campaign.

But as the election came closer, Gilmore shifted his campaign's focus against the state's tax on personal vehicles. The tax was strongly disliked by Virginians, per polling by the Gilmore camp, and thus it became a central focus of his campaign. Beyer attacked the plan to remove the tax as a gimmick and as a fraud that would take away an estimated $1 billion from schools, but nevertheless, put forth a more moderate tax cut of his own, owing to how salient the issue had become.

=== Polling ===
Poll source	Date(s) administered	Sample size	Margin of error	Don Beyer (D)	Jim Gilmore (R)	Other	Undecided
The Washington Post	October 19–21, 1997	1,005	± 3.0%	41%	48%	4%	11%
The Washington Post	September 12–16, 1997	808	± 3.5%	44%	43%	4%	9%

=== Debates ===
1997 Virginia gubernatorial debates
No.	Date	Host	Moderator	Link	Republican	Democratic
Key: P Participant A Absent N Not invited I Invited W Withdrawn						
Key: P Participant A Absent N Not invited I Invited W Withdrawn					Jim Gilmore	Don Beyer
1	Oct. 6, 1997	Virginia Commonwealth University; Virginia Public Television	L. Douglas Wilder	C-SPAN	P	P
2	Oct. 15, 1997	Fairfax County Chamber of Commerce	Judy Woodruff	C-SPAN	P	P

== Results ==
Virginia gubernatorial election, 1997
Party	Candidate	Votes	%	±%
Republican	Jim Gilmore	969,062	55.81%	−2.46%
Democratic	Don Beyer	738,971	42.56%	+1.67%
Reform	Sue Harris DeBauche	25,955	1.49%	
Write-ins		2,326	0.13%	
Majority		230,091	13.25%	−4.13%
Turnout		1,736,314		
Republican hold		Swing		

=== Results by county and city ===
County	Gilmore	Votes	Beyer	Votes	DeBauche	Votes	Others	Votes
Accomack	62.3%	4,529	34.5%	2,511	3.2%	234	0.0%	0
Albemarle	54.4%	13,287	44.2%	10,784	1.3%	319	0.1%	26
Alexandria	37.6%	11,115	61.4%	18,144	0.8%	251	0.1%	31
Alleghany	56.8%	2,337	41.5%	1,708	1.7%	72	0.0%	0
Amelia	62.3%	1,947	35.3%	1,101	2.4%	75	0.0%	0
Amherst	56.4%	4,571	42.0%	3,400	1.6%	131	0.0%	0
Appomattox	55.0%	2,177	43.1%	1,707	1.9%	76	0.0%	0
Arlington	36.8%	18,252	62.0%	30,736	1.1%	568	0.0%	24
Augusta	71.8%	11,789	26.9%	4,416	1.3%	214	0.0%	0
Bath	54.6%	807	42.8%	632	2.6%	38	0.1%	1
Bedford County	66.2%	10,989	31.9%	5,300	1.8%	304	0.0%	0
Bedford	50.2%	833	47.2%	784	2.6%	44	0.0%	0
Bland	66.3%	1,180	31.7%	564	2.0%	35	0.0%	0
Botetourt	66.0%	6,378	32.5%	3,136	1.5%	148	0.0%	0
Bristol	58.8%	2,172	40.6%	1,499	0.6%	21	0.1%	3
Brunswick	45.5%	1,946	51.9%	2,220	2.6%	113	0.0%	0
Buchanan	47.5%	2,941	50.4%	3,120	2.1%	129	0.0%	1
Buckingham	52.4%	1,799	45.1%	1,548	2.6%	89	0.0%	0
Buena Vista	57.0%	846	42.0%	623	1.0%	15	0.0%	0
Campbell	65.0%	9,230	33.4%	4,744	1.5%	216	0.0%	2
Caroline	47.7%	2,600	50.1%	2,731	2.1%	115	0.0%	0
Carroll	66.4%	4,549	31.2%	2,136	2.4%	164	0.0%	1
Charles City	35.5%	743	62.6%	1,311	1.9%	40	0.0%	0
Charlotte	61.4%	2,184	36.1%	1,285	2.5%	88	0.0%	0
Charlottesville	37.7%	3,354	60.2%	5,352	1.6%	142	0.5%	44
Chesapeake	57.0%	25,636	41.2%	18,509	1.3%	571	0.5%	221
Chesterfield	67.2%	46,779	31.1%	21,621	1.1%	779	0.6%	394
Clarke	56.3%	1,800	42.1%	1,347	1.6%	50	0.0%	0
Clifton Forge	43.5%	589	54.9%	744	1.6%	21	0.0%	0
Colonial Heights	75.1%	4,622	23.5%	1,446	1.3%	83	0.1%	7
Covington	47.0%	857	51.3%	935	1.6%	30	0.1%	1
Craig	59.8%	1,180	37.3%	736	2.8%	56	0.0%	0
Culpeper	64.5%	5,095	34.3%	2,708	1.2%	97	0.0%	1
Cumberland	62.1%	1,549	35.9%	896	2.0%	50	0.0%	0
Danville	59.1%	7,165	39.8%	4,828	1.1%	134	0.0%	0
Dickenson	48.5%	2,326	49.6%	2,379	2.0%	94	0.0%	0
Dinwiddie	58.6%	3,554	38.3%	2,321	3.1%	190	0.0%	0
Emporia	57.5%	855	38.5%	573	4.0%	60	0.0%	0
Essex	56.8%	1,499	40.9%	1,079	2.3%	62	0.0%	0
Fairfax County	52.5%	129,038	46.7%	114,697	0.8%	1,922	0.0%	121
Fairfax	52.5%	3,451	46.4%	3,047	1.0%	66	0.1%	4
Falls Church	34.2%	1,396	65.1%	2,655	0.6%	26	0.0%	2
Fauquier	65.2%	9,293	33.6%	4,792	1.1%	160	0.1%	14
Floyd	61.0%	2,288	36.0%	1,350	3.0%	111	0.0%	0
Fluvanna	64.0%	3,337	34.3%	1,790	1.6%	84	0.0%	1
Franklin County	58.5%	7,134	39.0%	4,760	2.5%	299	0.0%	0
Franklin	47.3%	1,134	50.3%	1,207	2.5%	59	0.0%	0
Frederick	68.8%	9,672	30.2%	4,246	1.0%	146	0.0%	0
Fredericksburg	44.1%	1,952	54.0%	2,394	1.5%	66	0.4%	19
Galax	58.4%	853	40.2%	588	1.4%	20	0.0%	0
Giles	55.9%	2,582	42.3%	1,951	1.8%	83	0.0%	1
Gloucester	62.3%	5,513	34.8%	3,074	2.9%	255	0.0%	1
Goochland	60.8%	3,929	37.1%	2,395	2.1%	136	0.0%	0
Grayson	60.6%	2,803	36.7%	1,696	2.7%	125	0.0%	0
Greene	68.9%	2,233	28.7%	930	2.3%	75	0.1%	2
Greensville	44.0%	1,201	54.4%	1,483	1.6%	43	0.0%	0
Halifax	62.0%	5,756	35.8%	3,328	2.2%	206	0.0%	0
Hampton	47.1%	15,432	51.5%	16,850	1.3%	435	0.1%	28
Hanover	70.5%	19,187	28.2%	7,679	1.3%	354	0.0%	7
Harrisonburg	60.3%	3,793	38.6%	2,429	1.0%	66	0.0%	1
Henrico	59.2%	46,367	39.1%	30,661	1.2%	912	0.5%	424
Henry	54.4%	8,014	42.3%	6,233	3.2%	477	0.0%	0
Highland	64.9%	630	33.4%	324	1.6%	16	0.0%	0
Hopewell	63.0%	3,100	35.0%	1,723	2.0%	97	0.0%	1
Isle of Wight	56.9%	4,647	41.8%	3,411	1.2%	100	0.1%	9
James City	58.3%	8,984	40.4%	6,218	1.2%	180	0.1%	16
King and Queen	49.8%	1,032	47.7%	988	2.5%	51	0.0%	0
King George	56.9%	2,063	41.4%	1,502	1.5%	55	0.1%	5
King William	60.4%	2,277	38.0%	1,430	1.6%	59	0.1%	2
Lancaster	62.0%	2,523	36.0%	1,464	1.8%	74	0.1%	6
Lee	60.1%	4,460	36.1%	2,676	3.8%	282	0.0%	0
Lexington	46.0%	703	52.8%	808	1.1%	17	0.1%	1
Loudoun	59.7%	20,997	39.0%	13,697	1.2%	407	0.1%	44
Louisa	56.0%	3,832	41.0%	2,806	2.9%	200	0.0%	0
Lunenburg	58.8%	2,230	39.6%	1,502	1.5%	58	0.0%	0
Lynchburg	55.5%	9,724	43.6%	7,634	0.8%	144	0.1%	15
Madison	63.1%	2,386	34.7%	1,312	2.2%	84	0.0%	0
Manassas	61.3%	4,277	37.4%	2,611	1.2%	87	0.0%	1
Manassas Park	70.1%	754	28.1%	302	1.8%	19	0.0%	0
Martinsville	46.7%	2,206	50.4%	2,377	2.8%	133	0.1%	3
Mathews	61.9%	2,184	35.0%	1,236	3.1%	110	0.0%	1
Mecklenburg	61.7%	4,226	35.1%	2,408	3.2%	217	0.0%	0
Middlesex	59.9%	2,279	36.8%	1,401	3.2%	122	0.0%	0
Montgomery	53.5%	9,445	44.7%	7,882	1.7%	308	0.0%	3
Nelson	47.5%	2,014	49.9%	2,113	2.6%	110	0.0%	1
New Kent	62.7%	2,856	35.1%	1,599	1.7%	78	0.5%	21
Newport News	52.7%	20,033	45.4%	17,237	1.9%	732	0.0%	4
Norfolk	40.1%	17,101	57.9%	24,679	1.7%	736	0.3%	126
Northampton	48.9%	1,755	48.7%	1,747	2.3%	84	0.1%	4
Northumberland	63.1%	2,409	35.0%	1,337	1.6%	62	0.2%	7
Norton	44.3%	647	53.2%	777	2.5%	36	0.0%	0
Nottoway	54.8%	2,201	43.7%	1,754	1.5%	60	0.0%	0
Orange	61.8%	4,124	36.6%	2,443	1.7%	111	0.0%	0
Page	62.3%	3,220	36.6%	1,890	0.7%	38	0.4%	19
Patrick	60.2%	2,726	37.1%	1,679	2.7%	123	0.0%	0
Petersburg	30.3%	2,460	67.4%	5,475	2.4%	192	0.0%	1
Pittsylvania	67.8%	10,445	30.6%	4,720	1.6%	243	0.0%	2
Poquoson	70.5%	2,592	28.6%	1,053	0.8%	31	0.1%	3
Portsmouth	41.5%	10,641	57.0%	14,613	1.4%	363	0.1%	32
Powhatan	71.4%	4,186	26.7%	1,567	1.9%	109	0.0%	0
Prince Edward	52.1%	2,476	46.0%	2,186	1.8%	86	0.0%	0
Prince George	65.1%	4,461	33.6%	2,305	1.2%	79	0.1%	7
Prince William	63.1%	32,049	35.6%	18,110	1.3%	651	0.0%	10
Pulaski	58.4%	5,162	39.8%	3,522	1.8%	159	0.0%	3
Radford	49.0%	1,466	49.2%	1,471	1.7%	52	0.1%	2
Rappahannock	56.2%	1,301	42.4%	982	1.3%	30	0.1%	2
Richmond County	63.3%	1,211	34.0%	651	2.6%	50	0.0%	0
Richmond	35.7%	17,544	62.3%	30,643	2.0%	967	0.0%	17
Roanoke County	62.5%	18,384	36.0%	10,576	1.5%	439	0.0%	4
Roanoke	48.3%	11,628	49.2%	11,857	2.5%	598	0.0%	5
Rockbridge	62.4%	3,339	36.2%	1,937	1.5%	78	0.0%	1
Rockingham	73.1%	12,074	25.6%	4,224	1.3%	214	0.0%	3
Russell	49.1%	3,675	49.2%	3,687	1.7%	125	0.0%	0
Salem	59.1%	4,445	39.0%	2,934	1.8%	139	0.0%	0
Scott	64.7%	4,050	33.3%	2,087	2.0%	125	0.0%	0
Shenandoah	71.2%	7,069	27.4%	2,718	1.2%	122	0.1%	14
Smyth	59.3%	5,366	38.8%	3,510	1.9%	175	0.0%	0
Southampton	51.0%	2,345	45.8%	2,105	3.3%	151	0.0%	0
Spotsylvania	60.1%	10,747	38.4%	6,872	1.5%	276	0.0%	1
Stafford	60.2%	11,416	38.1%	7,224	1.6%	295	0.1%	18
Staunton	60.3%	3,707	38.3%	2,352	1.4%	85	0.0%	0
Suffolk	53.8%	8,398	44.6%	6,959	1.6%	257	0.0%	3
Surry	42.5%	944	55.3%	1,229	2.2%	50	0.0%	0
Sussex	46.3%	1,371	51.1%	1,512	2.6%	77	0.0%	0
Tazewell	55.4%	5,515	42.6%	4,235	2.0%	194	0.0%	3
Virginia Beach	59.1%	51,945	38.7%	34,036	1.7%	1,511	0.5%	475
Warren	60.5%	4,139	38.4%	2,628	1.0%	70	0.1%	4
Washington	60.3%	7,528	38.1%	4,761	1.6%	198	0.1%	7
Waynesboro	63.6%	3,188	35.1%	1,758	1.3%	67	0.0%	2
Westmoreland	53.4%	2,148	44.8%	1,801	1.8%	74	0.0%	0
Williamsburg	44.7%	1,206	53.8%	1,451	1.4%	39	0.0%	0
Winchester	58.7%	3,114	40.2%	2,131	1.1%	59	0.0%	0
Wise	52.2%	4,834	46.3%	4,292	1.5%	142	0.0%	0
Wythe	62.1%	4,401	35.5%	2,512	2.1%	149	0.3%	22
York	62.9%	9,628	35.7%	5,469	1.3%	200	0.1%	14

Counties and independent cities that flipped from Republican to Democratic

- Buchanan
- Caroline
- Clifton Forge (independent city)
- Covington
- Dickenson (independent city)
- Fredericksburg (independent city)
- Franklin
- Hampton (independent city)
- Lexington (independent city)
- Nelson
- Radford (Independent city)
- Norton (independent city)
- Russell

== Analysis ==
The election was hard-fought and a dead heat, with polls from the summer into September showing little movement between either candidate. It was not until the final weeks that polls showed movement towards Gilmore, who ultimately won the race. Gilmore's opposition to the car tax was a major factor in his victory, and polls showed this was a factor in his support. His win was also in part due to his strength in rural and suburban areas, while performing relatively well in more populated urban areas. His victory also helped to flip the Lieutenant Governor's race and hold the Attorney General's race for Republicans. This was the first time a sweep of the three statewide offices had occurred since Reconstruction.

Beyer also was seen by some as having run an underwhelming campaign, and struggled in many respects. As taxes grew to become a major issue, Beyer's attacks on Gilmore's abortion stance seemed to become secondary, and failed to move support away from Gilmore. Moreover, his shift on the tax issue from opposition to proposing a tax cut of his own drew criticism from Gilmore. Beyer also was unable to secure the endorsement of former Governor L. Douglas Wilder, which was seen by many as a rebuke towards his campaign, and was believed to hurt his ability to mobilize Black voters. After the election, Beyer would stay out of elected office, until making a political comeback, going on to represent Virginia's 8th Congressional District in Congress, being first elected in 2014.
