= Randolph A. Beales =

American judge

Judge of the Virginia Court of Appeals
- Incumbent
- Assumed office April 26, 2006
- Appointed by: Virginia General Assembly
- Preceded by: Johanna Fitzpatrick

41st Attorney General of Virginia
- In office June 4, 2001 – January 12, 2002
- Governor: Jim Gilmore
- Preceded by: Mark Earley
- Succeeded by: Jerry Kilgore

Personal details
- Born: Randolph Allen Beales; February 10, 1960 (age 66) Richmond, Virginia, U.S.
- Party: Republican
- Spouse: Julie Leftwich
- Education: College of William & Mary (BA); University of Virginia (JD)

Randolph Allen "Randy" Beales (born February 10, 1960) is a judge on the Virginia Court of Appeals. He previously served as Chief Deputy Attorney General and succeeded to the position of Attorney General of Virginia in 2001.

== Early life and education ==
Beales is from Boydton, Virginia and graduated from the College of William and Mary and received his Juris Doctor degree from the University of Virginia in 1986.

== Career ==
Beales served in the federal government as a Republican appointee in the administrations of Ronald Reagan and George H. W. Bush. In 1994, he was tapped by Virginia Governor George Allen to serve in the Office of the Secretary of Education leading the Governor's Champion Schools initiative. In 1998, Beales was appointed Chief Deputy Attorney General by Virginia Attorney General Mark Earley.

On June 4, 2001, Earley resigned as Attorney General to seek the Republican nomination for Governor and Beales succeeded to the position of Attorney General. He was later confirmed in that position by the Virginia General Assembly.

He was elected a judge of the Virginia Court of Appeals by the Virginia General Assembly on March 10, 2006, to a term ending on April 15, 2014. He was elected to an additional eight years on the Court on January 14, 2014, taking the expiration of his term to April 15, 2022.

Legal offices
Preceded by Mark Earley	Attorney General of Virginia; June 4, 2001–January 12, 2002	Succeeded by Jerry W. Kilgore
Preceded by Rudolph Bumgardner, III	Judge, Virginia Court of Appeals; March 10, 2006–Present	Succeeded by incumbent
