= William Broaddus =

American politician

Attorney General of Virginia
- In office July 1, 1985 – January 11, 1986
- Governor: Chuck Robb
- Preceded by: Gerald Baliles
- Succeeded by: Mary Sue Terry

Personal details
- Born: 1942 (age 83–84)
- Party: Democratic
- Education: Washington and Lee University, University of Virginia School of Law

William Gray Broaddus (born 1942), is an American politician and lawyer who served as attorney general of Virginia from 1985 to 1986. Having been Deputy Attorney General under Gerald Baliles, Broaddus became Attorney General on July 1, 1985, when Baliles resigned to campaign for the office of Governor of Virginia. Broaddus previously served as County Attorney of Henrico County, Virginia.
