= Mary Sue Terry =

American politician

36th Attorney General of Virginia
- In office January 11, 1986 – January 28, 1993
- Governor: Gerald Baliles; Douglas Wilder
- Preceded by: William Broaddus
- Succeeded by: Stephen D. Rosenthal

Member of the Virginia House of Delegates
- In office January 11, 1978 – January 11, 1986 Serving with A. L. Philpott until 1983
- Preceded by: Garry DeBruhl
- Succeeded by: Roscoe Reynolds
- Constituency: 13th district (1978‍–‍1982); 12th district (1982‍–‍1983); 10th district (1983‍–‍1986)

Personal details
- Born: September 28, 1947 (age 78) Martinsville, Virginia, U.S.
- Party: Democratic
- Education: University of Richmond (BA); University of Virginia (MA, JD)

Mary Sue Terry (born September 28, 1947) is an American Democratic politician from the Commonwealth of Virginia.

== Early life ==
Terry was born the daughter of Nathaniel Chatham Terry and Nannie Ruth Terry in Martinsville, Virginia. She was an active and enthusiastic Democrat as a child.

She graduated from Hardin-Reynolds Memorial School in Critz, Virginia in 1965. She earned a BA in political science from the University of Richmond's Westhampton College in 1969, master's in government (1970) and law (1973) degrees from the University of Virginia and its law school.

== Early career ==
Terry was a member of the Virginia House of Delegates (1978–1986) and assistant commonwealth's attorney in Patrick County, Virginia 1973–1977.

She successfully argued eight cases before the Supreme Court of the United States. She negotiated a nationwide recall of 13,000 defective Ford ambulances, and led a successful investigation and prosecution of individuals and corporations associated with Lyndon LaRouche.

From 1990 to 1991, Terry was president of the National Association of Attorneys General. In 1992 she received the Wyman Award, the association's highest honor.

The Commonwealth of Virginia's courts did not allow prisoners to bring new exculpatory evidence more than three weeks after sentencing. Terry once said that "Evidence of innocence is irrelevant."

== Attorney general ==
Terry was elected attorney general in 1985 and reelected in 1989, becoming the first woman elected to statewide office in Virginia, the second woman to serve as attorney general of any U.S. state, and the first non-federal elected official in Virginia to garner more than one million votes in a single election. In 1989, she considered running for governor, but deferred to her fellow Democrat, then-Lieutenant Governor of Virginia Douglas Wilder, who became the first elected African-American governor of any U.S. state.

== Candidate for governor ==
Terry was attorney general of Virginia from 1986 until 1993, when she resigned to run for governor of Virginia against Republican George Allen. Allen won the November 1993 election despite Terry's early and significant lead. Her unpopular gun-control stance alienated her rural base voters. Her campaign was "lackluster", and the religious right was a factor even though Michael Farris lost his bid to be lieutenant governor of Virginia. Her opponents also pointed out that she was unmarried, and alleged that she was less empathetic on family issues.

== Life after candidacy ==
Following her defeat, Terry was a visiting professor at the University of Richmond's Jepson School of Leadership Studies. She served on the board of trustees at the University of Richmond from 1983 to 1991.

In 2007, Terry was consulting for Microsoft and nearby Ferrum College while living on her family farm in Patrick County, Virginia.

Since 1978, she has been a partner in Terry & Rogers, and a partner in the B.H. Cooper Farm, Inc., both in Stuart.

In 2008, with activist Susan Platt and others, Terry formed "The Farm Team", a PAC to "help Democratic women seek elected office." In the last quarter of 2008 they raised $6696 and contributed $4000, including $1000 to Sharon Bulova's 2009 election campaign for chairman of the board of supervisors in Fairfax County, Virginia. Terry was featured speaker at a breakfast fundraiser planned in Richmond February 7, 2009, in connection with Jefferson-Jackson Day. That event was connected to a reception at the governor's mansion, later canceled because Virginia law prohibits political fundraising by state officials while the Virginia General Assembly is in session. Democratic party officials argued the event did not violate that ban, because money had been collected before the session.

== Awards and memberships ==
- Service to Youth award, Virginia YMCA, 1981
- Distinguished Alumna award University of Richmond, 1984
- Patrick County-Stuart Chamber of Commerce (charter president and president, 1974–76)
- West Piedmont Planning District Crime Commission (1974–77)
- Ferrum College (president's board of advisors, 1978–83)
- West Piedmont Health Planning Council (1975–77)
- American Bar Association
- Virginia State Bar
- Virginia Trial Lawyers Association
- Omicron Delta Kappa (1980)
- University of Richmond (board of trustees)
- Patrick Henry Mental Health Center (board of directors, 1975–77)
- Virginia YMCA (board of directors)
- First National Bank of Stuart (board of directors, chairman)
- Library of Virginia, Virginia Women in History (2009)

== See also ==
- List of female state attorneys general in the United States

Virginia House of Delegates
Preceded by Garry DeBruhl	Member from the 13th district 1978–1982	Succeeded by Charles R. Hawkins
Preceded by Joseph P. Crouch	Member from the 12th district 1982–1983; Served alongside: A. L. Philpott	Succeeded by Bob Dobyns
Preceded by Pete Giesen; Allie Ray Hull	Member from the 10th district 1983–1986	Succeeded by Roscoe Reynolds
Legal offices
Preceded by William Broaddus	Attorney General of Virginia; 1986–1993	Succeeded by Stephen Rosenthal
Party political offices
Preceded by Douglas Wilder	Democratic nominee for Governor of Virginia; 1993	Succeeded by Don Beyer
