= Stephen D. Rosenthal =

American lawyer

37th Attorney General of Virginia
- In office January 29, 1993 – January 15, 1994
- Governor: Douglas Wilder
- Preceded by: Mary Sue Terry
- Succeeded by: Jim Gilmore

Personal details
- Born: Stephen Douglas Rosenthal; October 24, 1949 (age 76) Richmond, Virginia, U.S.
- Party: Democratic
- Spouse: Cynthia Huffstetler
- Education: Washington & Lee University

Stephen Douglas Rosenthal (born October 24, 1949) is an American attorney who served as the 37th Attorney General of Virginia. Elected by the Virginia General Assembly to fill the vacancy of Mary Sue Terry, he remained in office until the election of Jim Gilmore.

Legal offices
| Preceded by Mary Sue Terry | Attorney General of Virginia; 1993–1994 | Succeeded by Jim Gilmore |
