= Richard Cullen (attorney) =

American lawyer

Counselor to the Governor of Virginia
- In office January 15, 2022 – January 17, 2026
- Governor: Glenn Youngkin
- Preceded by: Cynthia Bailey

39th Attorney General of Virginia
- In office June 12, 1997 – January 17, 1998
- Governor: George Allen
- Preceded by: Jim Gilmore
- Succeeded by: Mark Earley

United States Attorney for the Eastern District of Virginia
- In office October 1991 – March 23, 1993
- President: George H. W. Bush; Bill Clinton
- Preceded by: Kenneth E. Melson
- Succeeded by: Kenneth E. Melson

Personal details
- Born: March 10, 1948 (age 78) Brooklyn, New York, U.S.
- Party: Republican
- Spouse: Agnes Tullidge
- Children: 4 including Thomas
- Education: Furman University (BA); University of South Carolina, Columbia; University of Richmond (JD)

Richard Cullen (born March 10, 1948) is an American attorney who served as counselor to Virginia governor Glenn Youngkin. He is a former attorney general of Virginia, United States Attorney for the Eastern District of Virginia, and partner and chairman of McGuireWoods LLP.

As a partner with McGuireWoods, he represented high-profile clients such as U.S. vice president Mike Pence; Sepp Blatter, the eighth president of the Fédération Internationale de Football Association (FIFA); Dwight Clinton Jones, the then-mayor of Richmond, Virginia; former U.S. Congressman Tom DeLay and Elin Nordegren, the ex-wife of professional golfer Tiger Woods.

== Early life and education ==
Born in Brooklyn, New York, Cullen was raised in Staunton, Virginia. He majored in political science and played varsity football at Furman University in Greenville, South Carolina, earning a Bachelor of Arts degree in 1971. He attended the University of South Carolina School of Law in Columbia, South Carolina, from 1971 to 1972, and then worked in Washington, D.C. for U.S. Representative M. Caldwell Butler. Cullen then returned to Virginia and earned a J.D. degree in 1977 from the University of Richmond T.C. Williams School of Law. He served as editor in chief of the school's law review.

== Career ==
Cullen has been with McGuireWoods LLP since entering practice in 1977. He was named chairman in December 2006, succeeding Robert L. Burrus Jr., and led the firm for 11 years. He was succeeded by Jonathan Harmon. As a partner in the firm, Cullen focuses on complex commercial litigation; government, regulatory and criminal investigations; white collar defense; and accountant defense.

Cullen represented Mike Pence, the 48th vice president of the United States, in relation to Special Counsel Robert Mueller’s Russia investigation. He also advised Fred and Cindy Warmbier, the parents of University of Virginia student Otto Warmbier, in a wrongful death suit against the North Korean government.

He represented then-FIFA president Joseph “Sepp” Blatter in relation to the investigation of FIFA by the Department of Justice and the Eastern District of New York.

Cullen, along with former federal prosecutor and fellow McGuireWoods partner Toby Vick, negotiated an immunity deal with the U.S. Justice Department on behalf of businessman Jonnie Williams amid a federal investigation involving then-Virginia Governor Bob McDonnell.

He led a successful bipartisan effort in 2013 to have Tracy Thorne-Begland seated on the Richmond General District Court Bench, making him the first openly gay judge in Virginia history.

Cullen was the lead attorney for former U.S. Rep. Tom DeLay, R-Texas, during a six-year Justice Department investigation into alleged links between the congressman and former lobbyist Jack Abramoff. No criminal charges were filed against the former House majority leader.

Cullen and fellow McGuireWoods partner Dennis I. Belcher represented Elin Nordegren in her August 2010 settlement with professional golfer Tiger Woods.

In 2010, it was reported that Cullen was among the lawyers representing Bank of America in a multi-state investigation into the bank's foreclosure practices.

Since joining the firm, Cullen has taken leave three times for public service assignments. In 1987, he served as special counsel to U.S. Sen. Paul S. Trible Jr., R-Va., during the Iran-Contra investigation. He was appointed by President George H. W. Bush in 1991 as U.S. Attorney for the Eastern District of Virginia, serving until 1993. In 1997, Virginia Governor George Allen appointed Cullen Attorney General of Virginia to fill the unexpired term of Jim Gilmore, who resigned to conduct a successful campaign for governor. In addition, Cullen was on President George W. Bush's legal team during the recount of the 2000 election in Florida.

Cullen was part of the defense team hired to represent Boeing in a federal criminal investigation related to the 737 MAX aircraft. In January 2021, Boeing entered into a deferred prosecution agreement with the U.S. Department of Justice.

== Personal life ==
Cullen is married to Agnes Tullidge Cullen and has four grown children. His son, Thomas T. Cullen, was confirmed in the U.S. Senate on September 10, 2020 to serve as a U.S. district judge for the Western District of Virginia.

Legal offices
Preceded by Jim Gilmore	Attorney General of Virginia; 1997–1998	Succeeded by Mark Earley
Business positions
Preceded by Robert L. Burrus Jr.	Chair of the executive committee of McGuireWoods; 2006–2017	Succeeded by Jonathan Harmon
