= Mark Earley =

American attorney and former politician

40th Attorney General of Virginia
- In office January 17, 1998 – June 3, 2001
- Governor: Jim Gilmore
- Preceded by: Richard Cullen
- Succeeded by: Randy Beales

Member of the Virginia Senate from the 14th district
- In office January 13, 1988 – November 24, 1997
- Preceded by: William Parker
- Succeeded by: Randy Forbes

Personal details
- Born: Mark Lawrence Earley; July 26, 1954 (age 71) Norfolk, Virginia, U.S.
- Party: Republican
- Spouse: Cynthia Breithaupt
- Children: 6, including Mark Jr.
- Education: College of William & Mary (BA, JD)
- Website: Official website

Mark Lawrence Earley (born July 26, 1954) is an American attorney and former politician. A Republican, he was elected to the Virginia State Senate (1988–1997), and then elected Attorney General of Virginia (1998 to 2001). In 2001, he resigned as Attorney General to focus his time on the 2001 campaign for Governor of Virginia. He ran to succeed James Gilmore, but lost to Democrat Mark Warner.

== Biography ==
Earley was born in Norfolk and graduated from the College of William and Mary, receiving first an undergraduate degree in religion and later a J.D. degree. He is married to the former Cynthia Breithaupt and a father of six children.

After admission to the Virginia bar, Earley had a private legal practice in Norfolk for fifteen years.

Beginning in 1987, Earley represented the 14th Senatorial District in southeast Virginia for a decade. He was succeeded by Randy Forbes, who later won election to the U.S. House of Representatives from Virginia's 4th congressional district.

He attributes his interest in politics to his two years as a missionary in Manila, the Philippines.

In 1997, Virginia voters elected Earley Attorney General. He polled 57.5% of the vote compared to Democratic Party candidate Bill Dolan of McLean who garnered 42% of the votes cast.

As Attorney General, Earley worked with his predecessor, James S. Gilmore, who had won election as Governor of Virginia during the same election. He had a mixed record on consumer issues, and also had initiatives against abortion and for youth mentoring during his years in office.

In the 2001 gubernatorial election to succeed Gilmore (limited to one term by the state constitution), Earley garnered 47% of the vote, compared to Democrat Mark Warner's 52% of the vote and libertarian W.B. Redpath who received less than 1% of the votes cast.

Earley then returned to his general legal practice in Norfolk. From 2002 to 2011, Earley was president of Prison Fellowship, a prominent Christian organization founded by former Watergate figure Charles Colson dedicated to ministry to prison inmates and their families. He garnered media attention in 2015 because of his changed attitudes towards criminal justice issues, now focusing on rehabilitation rather than incarceration, and coming out against the death penalty although he had defended executions as Attorney General.

Legal offices
Preceded by Richard Cullen	Attorney General of Virginia; 1998–2001	Succeeded by Randy Beales
Party political offices
Preceded by Jim Gilmore	Republican nominee for Governor of Virginia; 2001	Succeeded by Jerry Kilgore
