= Virginia Attorney General =

Attorney general for the U.S. state of Virginia

Attorney General of Virginia
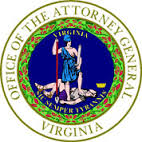
- Seal of the attorney general of Virginia

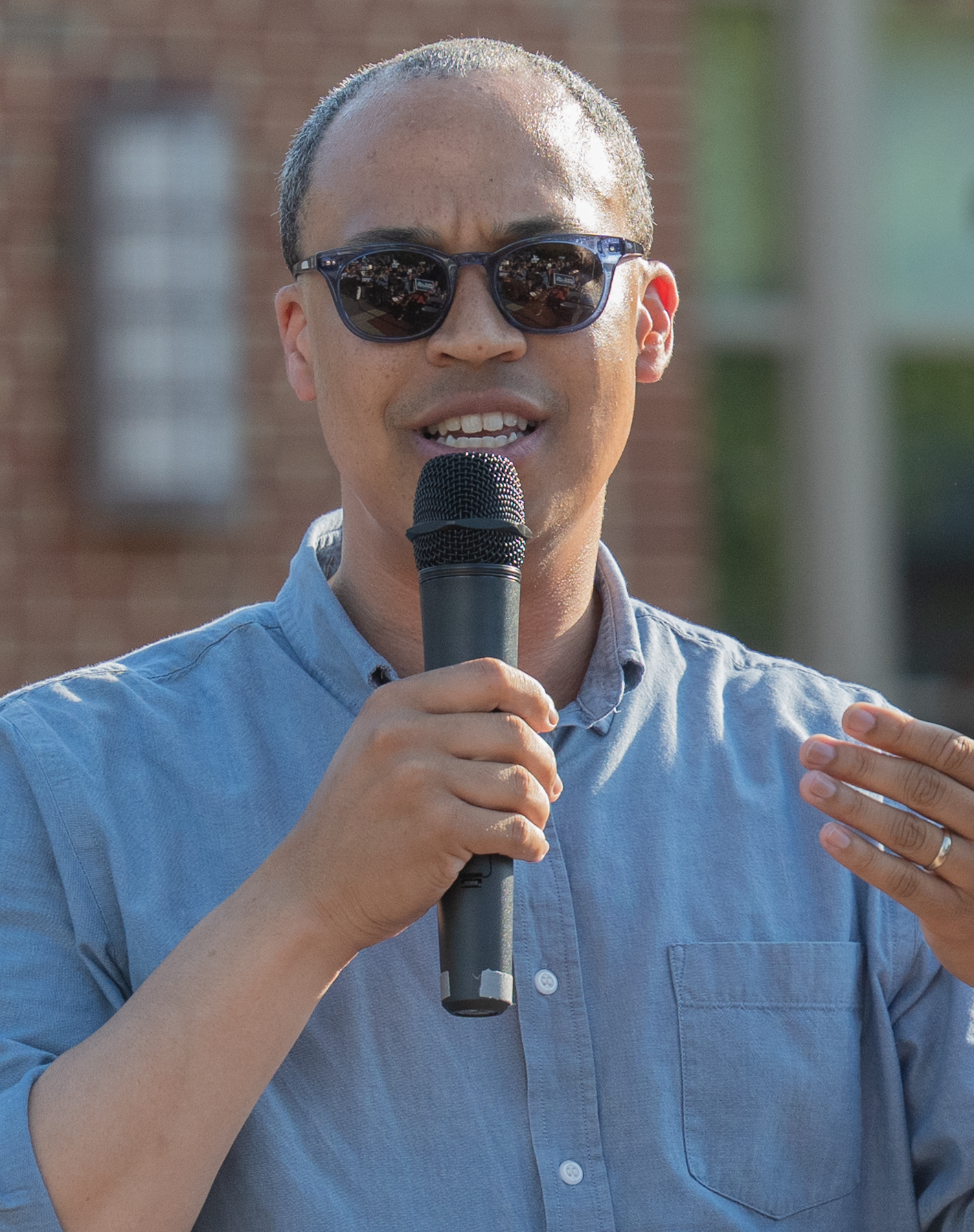
- Incumbent; Jay Jones since January 17, 2026
- Style: The Honorable
- Type: Elected constitutional position
- Term length: Four years; no term limits
- Formation: 1776
- First holder: Edmund Randolph
- Website: www.oag.state.va.us

The attorney general of Virginia is an elected constitutional position that holds an executive office in the government of Virginia. Attorneys general are elected for a four-year term in the year following a presidential election. There are no term limits restricting the number of terms someone can serve as attorney general.

== History ==
In the Colony of Virginia, attorneys general were typically appointed by the king of England, with vacancies in the office filled by the appointment of the colonial governor or lieutenant governor, sometimes in consultation with the governor's council. The Virginia Constitution of 1851 provided for the popular election of the attorney general.

Mary Sue Terry, sworn in during 1986, was Virginia's first female attorney general. Jason Miyares, sworn in on January 15, 2022, became the state's first Latino attorney general. Jay Jones, sworn in on January 17, 2026, became the state's first Black attorney general.

== Qualifications ==
The position of attorney general is established by Article V, Section 15 of the Constitution of Virginia, and they are elected for four years and serve concurrently with the governor. All candidates for attorney general must be at least thirty years old, a citizen of the United States, and have the same qualifications required of a Virginia Circuit Court judge.

== Responsibilities ==
The attorney general represents the legal interests of the people of Virginia and agencies and boards of the state's government. By law, the attorney general must represent the state and its constituent agencies unless it is impractical to do so, in which case private legal representation may be contracted to serve in their place. They are responsible for aiding investigative activities into certain criminal activities, enforcing certain laws, and providing official advice on questions of law to members of the Virginia General Assembly and other state officials. The attorney general can be impeached and removed from office by the Virginia General Assembly.

The office of attorney general is led by the attorney general. Under them serve a chief deputy attorney general, four deputy attorneys general, and various other legal and support staff.

== List of attorneys general ==
=== Colonial Virginia ===
Records of this period are sparse. The attorney general was appointed by the King, a combination of the governor and council, or the governor or acting governor. There was no term of office, and the office may have been vacant for extended periods.

Name	Term	Notes
Richard Lee	October 12, 1643 – c. 1651	Appointed by Governor William Berkeley and Council
(Office not in use?)	1652–1660	Office apparently vacant during the Interregnum
Peter Jenings	Before June 25, 1670 – c. October 12, 1670	Reappointed by Charles II of England on September 15, 1670
George Jordan	October 12, 1670 – at least October 3, 1672	Appointed by Governor William Berkeley and Council
Robert Beverley	March 10, 1676 (appointed)	Appointed by Governor William Berkeley and Council
George Jordan	Acting on May 20, 1677	
William Sherwood	Early March 1677 – at least until November 25, 1678	
Edward Hill	appointed by Deputy Governor Henry Chicheley on September 27, 1679.	
Edmund Jenings	1680 – before November 16, 1686	
George Brent	Before November 16, 1686 – before May 1, 1688	Acting
Edmund Jenings	c. May 1, 1688 – June 10, 1691	
Edward Chilton	October 20, 1691 (sworn) – April 1694	Appointed by Governor Francis Nicholson. Resigned.
William Randolph	April 1694 (sworn) – October 29, 1698	Appointed by Governor Francis Nicholson. Resigned.
Bartholomew Fowler	October 29, 1698 – September 4, 1700	Appointed by Governor Francis Nicholson. Resigned.
Benjamin Harrison III	October 17, 1700 – c. 1702	Appointed by Governor Francis Nicholson and Council.
Stevens Thomson	March 2, 1704 (sworn) – February 1714	Privy Council approved appointment July 30, 1703. Died in office.
John Clayton	1714 – November 18, 1737	Appointed by Lieutenant Governor Alexander Spotswood, given leave to England
Sir John Randolph	April 22, 1726 – late 1727 or early 1728	Appointed acting by Lieutenant Governor William Gooch in Clayton's absence
John Clayton	late 1727 or early 1728 – November 18, 1737	Reappointed by royal warrant after February 29, 1728. Died in office
Edward Barradall	Acting between November 17 and 25, 1737 – June 19, 1743	Appointed acting by Lieutenant Governor William Gooch, followed by warrant March 7, 1738, died in office
Thomas Nelson	Between June 19 and 27, 1743 – summer 1744	Appointed acting by Lieutenant Governor William Gooch
Peyton Randolph	May 7, 1744 (warrant) – sometime before January 29, 1754	Office declared forfeit on June 20, 1754
Peyton Randolph	May 13, 1755 (warrant) – sometime soon after November 22, 1766	Resigned
George Wythe	c. January 29, 1754 – between January 20 and February 10, 1755	Appointed acting by Lieutenant Governor Robert Dinwiddie
George Wythe	c. after November 22, 1766 – between June 4 and 11, 1767	Appointed acting by Lieutenant Governor Francis Fauquier
John Randolph	Between June 4 and 11, 1767 – early September 1775 (fled)	Fled Virginia in September 1775

=== Virginia (1776–1857) ===
From 1776 to 1851, the attorney general was elected by the General Assembly, or, in case of vacancy, appointed by the governor for an undefined term. The Virginia Constitution of 1851 introduced popular election and four-year terms. After the 1851 constitution, vacancies would be filled by the General Assembly, if they were in session, or by the governor.

Image	Name	Term	Party	Notes
	Edmund Randolph	early July 1776 – November 30, 1786		Elected by convention
	James Innes	November 30, 1786 – November 13, 1796		Resigned
	John Marshall	mid-October 1794 – late March 1795		Acting
	Robert Brooke	mid-November 1796 – February 27, 1800	Democratic-Republican	Died in office
	Philip Norborne Nicholas	March 15, 1800 – January 7, 1819	Democratic-Republican	Appointed by Governor James Monroe, elected by General Assembly, resigned
	John Robertson	January 21, 1819 – mid-October 1834	Democratic	Resigned
	Sidney Smith Baxter	December 11, 1834 – January 1, 1852	Democratic	
	Willis Perry Bocock	January 1, 1852 – May 15, 1857	Democratic	Resigned

=== Civil War and Reconstruction ===
Tucker served as the attorney general of Confederate Virginia throughout the Civil War. Wheat and Bowden served as the attorneys general for Restored Government of Virginia. From 1865 to 1870, the commanding general of the military district of Virginia appointed the office.

Image	Name	Term	Party	Notes
	John Randolph Tucker	June 13, 1857 – May 9, 1865	Democratic	Confederate attorney general throughout war. Left office when government abandoned Richmond.
	James S. Wheat	June 21, 1861 – December 7, 1863	Republican	Elected at the Wheeling Convention and then in a May 1862 election for the Restored Government of Virginia in Wheeling.
	Thomas Russell Bowden	December 7, 1863 – August 1, 1869	Union	Attorney general for the Restored Government of Virginia in Wheeling, then Alexandria, after West Virginia separated, and in post-war Reconstruction Virginia.
	Charles Whittlesey	September 10, 1869 – January 19, 1870	Republican	Appointed and removed by Brigadier General Edward Richard Sprigg Canby
	James Craig Taylor	January 19, 1870 – January 1, 1874	Conservative Party of Virginia	Appointed by Brigadier General Canby after winning election (moving forward swearing-in date)

=== Virginia (1874–present) ===
Image	Name	Term	Party	Notes
	Raleigh Travers Daniel	January 1, 1874 – August 16, 1877	Conservative Party of Virginia	Died in office
	James Gavin Field	August 29, 1877 – January 1, 1882	Conservative Party of Virginia	Appointed and then elected
	Francis Simpson Blair	January 1, 1882 – January 1, 1886	Readjuster Party	
	Rufus A. Ayers	January 1, 1886 – January 1, 1890	Democratic	
	R. Taylor Scott	January 1, 1890 – August 5, 1897	Democratic	Died in office
	Richard Carter Scott	August 11, 1897 – January 1, 1898	Democratic	appointed by Governor Charles T. O'Ferrall
	Andrew Jackson Montague	January 1, 1898 – January 1, 1902	Democratic	Became governor January 1, 1902
	William Alexander Anderson	January 1, 1902 – February 1, 1910	Democratic	
	Samuel Walker Williams	February 1, 1910 – February 2, 1914	Democratic	
	John Garland Pollard	February 2, 1914 – January 5, 1918	Democratic	Resigned.
	Josiah D. Hank Jr.	January 5, 1918 - February 1, 1918	Democratic	Appointed by Governor Henry C. Stuart
	John R. Saunders	February 1, 1918 – March 17, 1934	Democratic	Died in office
	Abram Penn Staples	March 22, 1934 – October 6, 1947	Democratic	Resigned to become judge of the Virginia Supreme Court of Appeals
	Harvey Black Apperson	October 7, 1947 – February 2, 1948	Democratic	Appointed by Governor; Died in office
	J. Lindsay Almond	February 11, 1948 – September 16, 1957	Democratic	Resigned to run for Governor
	Kenneth Cartwright Patty	September 1957 – January 1958	Democratic	Appointed by Governor
	Albertis Sydney Harrison	January 1958 – April 1961	Democratic	Resigned to run for Governor
	Frederick Thomas Gray	May 1961 – January 1962	Democratic	Appointed by Governor
	Robert Young Button	January 1962 – January 1970	Democratic	
	Andrew Pickens Miller	January 1970 – January 1977	Democratic	Resigned to run for Governor
	Anthony Francis Troy	January 1977 – January 1978	Democratic	
	J. Marshall Coleman	January 14, 1978 – January 16, 1982	Republican	
	Gerald Baliles	January 16, 1982 – June 30, 1985	Democratic	Resigned to run for Governor
	William Broaddus	July 1, 1985 – January 11, 1986	Democratic	
	Mary Sue Terry	January 11, 1986 – January 28, 1993	Democratic	First Female Attorney General Resigned to run for Governor
	Stephen D. Rosenthal	January 29, 1993 – January 15, 1994	Democratic	
	Jim Gilmore	January 15, 1994 – June 11, 1997	Republican	Resigned to run for Governor
	Richard Cullen	June 11, 1997 – January 17, 1998	Republican	
	Mark Earley	January 17, 1998 – June 4, 2001	Republican	Resigned to run for Governor
	Randolph A. Beales	July 11, 2001 – January 12, 2002	Republican	
	Jerry Kilgore	January 12, 2002 – February 1, 2005	Republican	Resigned to run for Governor
	Judith Jagdmann	February 1, 2005 – January 14, 2006	Republican	
	Bob McDonnell	January 14, 2006 – February 20, 2009	Republican	Resigned to run for Governor
	Bill Mims	February 20, 2009 – January 16, 2010	Republican	
	Ken Cuccinelli	January 16, 2010 – January 11, 2014	Republican	
	Mark Herring	January 11, 2014 – January 15, 2022	Democratic	
	Jason Miyares	January 15, 2022 – January 17, 2026	Republican	First Hispanic and Latino American attorney general.
	Jay Jones	January 17, 2026 – present	Democratic	First African-American attorney general.

== Works cited ==
- Dinan, John J. (2014). The Virginia State Constitution. Oxford University Press. ISBN 9780199355723.
