= Jim Gilmore =

American politician and diplomat (born 1949)

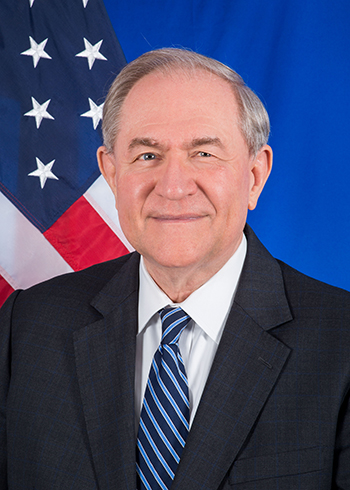
- Official portrait, 2019

United States Ambassador to the Organization for Security and Cooperation in Europe
- In office July 2, 2019 – January 20, 2021
- President: Donald Trump
- Preceded by: Dan Baer
- Succeeded by: Michael R. Carpenter

Chair of the Republican National Committee
- In office January 18, 2001 – December 5, 2001
- Preceded by: Jim Nicholson
- Succeeded by: Marc Racicot

68th Governor of Virginia
- In office January 17, 1998 – January 12, 2002
- Lieutenant: John Hager
- Preceded by: George Allen
- Succeeded by: Mark Warner

38th Attorney General of Virginia
- In office January 15, 1994 – June 11, 1997
- Governor: George Allen
- Preceded by: Stephen Rosenthal
- Succeeded by: Richard Cullen

Commonwealth's Attorney for Henrico County
- In office January 1, 1988 – January 15, 1994
- Preceded by: L. A. Harris
- Succeeded by: Toby Vick

Personal details
- Born: James Stuart Gilmore III; October 6, 1949 (age 77) Richmond, Virginia, U.S.
- Party: Republican
- Spouse: Roxane Gatling (m. 1977; died 2024)
- Children: 2
- Education: University of Virginia (BA, JD)

Military service
- Branch/service: United States Army
- Years of service: 1971–1974
- Unit: 650th Group, Military Intelligence Corps
- Awards: Joint Service Commendation Medal

James Stuart Gilmore III (born October 6, 1949) is an American politician, diplomat and former attorney who served as the 68th governor of Virginia from 1998 to 2002. A member of the Republican Party, Gilmore also chaired the Republican National Committee in 2001 and served as the U.S. ambassador to the Organization for Security and Cooperation in Europe during the first Trump administration.

A native Virginian, Gilmore graduated with a Bachelor of Arts and a Juris Doctor from the University of Virginia, and then served in the U.S. Army as a counterintelligence agent. He was later elected to public office as a county prosecutor and the Attorney General of Virginia before being elected Governor of Virginia in 1997. After his gubernatorial tenure ended in 2002, Gilmore unsuccessfully ran for the U.S. Senate in 2008 and for the Republican nomination for President of the United States in the 2008 and 2016 elections.

In November 2018, Gilmore was nominated by President Donald Trump to serve as the U.S. representative to United States Mission to the Organization for Security and Cooperation in Europe, a position which carries the rank of ambassador. His nomination was confirmed by a voice vote of the U.S. Senate on May 23, 2019. Gilmore was sworn in on June 25, 2019 and presented his credentials to OSCE Secretary General Thomas Greminger on July 2, 2019.

== Early life and education ==
Gilmore was born in Richmond, Virginia, the son of Margaret Evelyn (née Kandle), a church secretary, and James Stuart Gilmore Jr., a grocery store meat cutter. He graduated from John Randolph Tucker High School in 1967, and received a Bachelor of Arts degree from the University of Virginia in 1971, where he was classmates with George Allen, who would later precede Gilmore as Governor of Virginia.

Gilmore met his future wife, Roxane Gatling, at a Jefferson Literary and Debating Society club meeting in the Fall of 1974 while he was a law student and she was an undergraduate. During her senior year, Gatling became ill with a serious recurrence of Hodgkin's disease. Jim Gilmore accompanied her to her chemotherapy treatments and hospitalizations. The couple married in on August 6, 1977, and had two sons, Jay and Ashton Gilmore.

== Military service ==
In 1971, Gilmore volunteered to serve in the United States Army after attending college, receiving training and preparation for service in the Military Intelligence Corps at the newly created United States Army Intelligence Center at Fort Huachuca in Arizona. Gilmore also received rigorous foreign language education at the United States Defense Language Institute in Monterey, California. Gilmore then worked for three years in the early 1970s, in the 650th Military Intelligence Group. Serving in West Germany during the Vietnam War and fluent in German, he served as a U.S. Army Counterintelligence Agent.

== Legal career ==
Gilmore attended the University of Virginia School of Law, once again classmates with future fellow Virginia governor George Allen, graduating with his J.D. degree in 1977. A decade later, he was elected Commonwealth's Attorney in Henrico County and went on to be re-elected in 1991. In 1981, Gilmore ran for the Virginia House of Delegates in the 32nd district, however he lost the general election. In 1993, he was elected Virginia's attorney general, defeating Democratic nominee William D. Dolan III by more than 10 percentage points (958,982 to 749,565 votes). Gilmore resigned in 1997 to run for governor.

== Governor of Virginia ==
In 1997, Gilmore faced then-Lieutenant Governor Don Beyer and Reform Party candidate Sue Harris Debauche in a bid to succeed George Allen as governor. Gilmore campaigned heavily on the twin promises of hiring 4,000 new teachers in public schools and phasing out Virginia's personal property tax on automobiles. Gilmore was elected, winning 56% of the vote to Beyer's 43%.

In his first year as governor, Gilmore pushed for car tax reduction legislation that was eventually passed by the Democratic-controlled General Assembly. The legislation reduced car taxes on all cars valued less than $1,000, and phased out the tax on auto values over $1,000 as follows: 12.5% reduction in 1998; 25% reduction in 1999; 47.5% reduction in 2000; 70% reduction in 2001; 100% reduction in 2002. Beginning in 2001, Virginia's economy slowed and tax revenues flattened. In addition to a downturn in the national economy in 2001, Northern Virginia's economy was severely impacted after terrorists flew a hijacked airplane into the Pentagon in Arlington, Virginia, on September 11, 2001, resulting in the closure of Ronald Reagan Washington National Airport for 23 days. Despite the economic downturn, Gilmore insisted on advancing the car tax phase out from a 47.5% reduction of each taxpayer's bill in 2000 to the scheduled 70% reduction in 2001. Gilmore signed an executive order, which was passed by the General Assembly, reducing state spending by all agencies, except for education, to keep the state's budget balanced during the economic downturn. Democrats criticized the spending reductions and car tax cut. According to The Washington Post, "Virginia's politicians struggled to balance car-tax relief against demands for public services." When Gilmore left office in January 2002, the state's "rainy day fund," or revenue stabilization fund, had fallen to $900 million.

In April 1998, Gilmore's first trip abroad as governor was to Germany with his Secretary of Commerce, Barry Duval. They sought to expand jobs and investment with German companies who at the time had invested more than $2 billion and 10,000 jobs in the Commonwealth. During his tenure, Gilmore was focused on creating jobs by leading several trade missions to: South America in 1999 (Argentina, Brazil, Chile); Asia in 2000 (Japan, South Korea, Taiwan); Europe again in 2001 (Germany, United Kingdom, Ireland). Since leaving office, Gilmore has also traveled to Pakistan, Australia, and Peru. He also traveled to Israel when he was Attorney General of Virginia in the early 1990s.

The Gilmore Administration implemented new Standards of Learning reforms in Virginia's public schools. The Standards of Learning prescribed a uniform curriculum in mathematics, science, English and social studies and instituted new tests at the end of the third, fifth and eighth grades, as well as end-of-course tests in high school, to measure student achievement. During Gilmore's term, Virginia's public school students' scores increased on these state tests as well as when compared to national norms.

In 1999, Gilmore proposed and signed into law legislation that reduced tuition at public colleges and universities by 20%. Gilmore also commissioned a Blue Ribbon Commission on Higher Education that studied accountability and governance of public colleges and universities. Gilmore's Commission authored the first blueprint for decentralized regulatory and administrative authority to some universities in return for agreements to meet agreed upon performance objectives.

Gilmore also proposed and signed into law Virginia's first stand-alone Martin Luther King Holiday. Prior to this proposal, Virginia had observed a combined Lee–Jackson–King Day that recognized Robert E. Lee, Stonewall Jackson and Martin Luther King on the same day each year. Gilmore and his wife hosted a historic reception in the Governor's Mansion for Coretta Scott King and announced a technology partnership between Virginia and the King Center for Nonviolence. Gilmore also proposed and funded a new African-American History Trail in Virginia and called upon the State Board of Education to include a more diverse range of historical figures in Virginia's Social Studies curriculum. Test scores during Gilmore's term showed a narrowing of the "achievement gap" between minority and white students. Gilmore significantly increased funding for two of Virginia's historically black universities, Norfolk State University and Virginia State University.

Gilmore created the nation's first state Secretary of Technology, a position first held by Donald Upson. Together they established a statewide technology commission, and signed into law the nation's first comprehensive state Internet policy.

During his term, 37 people were executed in Virginia. Gilmore granted executive clemency to one death row inmate on the basis of mental illness. In another well publicized case, he pardoned Earl Washington Jr., a former death row inmate, after DNA tests, ordered by Gilmore, implicated another person. Gilmore also ordered DNA tests in the case of Derek Rocco Barnabei; the tests confirmed Barnabei's guilt and he was executed.

As governor, Gilmore signed into law legislation establishing a 24-hour waiting period and informed consent for women seeking an abortion, as well as a ban against partial birth abortion. Gilmore increased funding for adoption services. He also signed into law a bill that banned human cloning. In 1998, Gilmore went to court to try to prevent the removal of a feeding tube of a car crash victim, the former Kentucky news anchor Hugh Finn, who had suffered from a persistent vegetative state for several years. Gilmore lost his petition that removal of a feeding tube was not removal of artificial life support because it amounted to starvation of an infirm person who could not feed himself and Finn was allowed to die, upholding his wishes as he had expressed them to his family while he was working on developing a living will when still in good health that he wished not to be kept alive in such a state. As Attorney General of Virginia, Gilmore had defended a legal challenge to Virginia's first parental notification law for minors seeking abortions.

The Virginia Constitution forbids any governor from serving consecutive terms, so Gilmore could not run for a second term in 2001. He was succeeded by Democrat Mark Warner, who took office in early 2002.

== Subsequent runs for office ==
=== 2008 presidential candidacy ===
A "Draft Gilmore for President" group was formed in August 2006 encouraging Gilmore to run for President of the United States. On December 19, 2006, Gilmore announced he would form an exploratory committee to "fill the conservative void" in the race. On January 9, 2007, Gilmore officially filed papers with the Federal Election Commission to form the Jim Gilmore for President Exploratory Committee.

Gilmore said he represented "the Republican wing of the Republican Party" in the race for the 2008 Presidential nomination; the comment mirrored the slogan used by Howard Dean when seeking the Democratic nomination in the 2004 election, who lifted the slogan from Senator Paul Wellstone. Gilmore officially announced his candidacy on April 26, 2007.

In the first quarter of 2007 Gilmore raised $174,790, the second lowest of any of the major-party candidates. Gilmore hosted only one fundraiser in the first quarter due to a late exploratory announcement.

On July 14, 2007, Gilmore announced that he was ending his campaign. Gilmore said that it would be "impractical" to run, citing the difficulty of raising enough money to be competitive in early-voting states Iowa, New Hampshire, and South Carolina.

=== 2008 Senate campaign ===
In an interview with Politico, Gilmore said that he had been approached to run for the Senate seat of John Warner, who had announced that he would retire at the end of his term in 2009. By the end of the summer, many media outlets, most notably The Washington Post, thought it would be a foregone conclusion that Gilmore would jump into the Senate race. Gilmore's successor as governor, Mark Warner, had already announced in September, and 11th District Congressman Tom Davis had informally announced his candidacy a few days after Mark Warner's announcement.

Gilmore lobbied strongly for choosing the party's nominee at a statewide convention rather than a primary, claiming that a convention would cost only $1 million versus the $4 million required to run a primary campaign. This was no small consideration, as the race for the Democratic nomination essentially ended with Mark Warner's entry into the race. It was understood that Warner would use his considerable wealth to self-finance his campaign. It was thought that a convention would favor Gilmore, since most of the delegates would come from the party's activist base, which is tilted strongly to the right. A primary was thought to favor Davis due to his popularity in voter-rich Northern Virginia; Davis is a moderate Republican, and most Republicans in Northern Virginia tend to be more moderate than their counterparts elsewhere in the state. On October 13, 2007, the state party's central committee voted 47–37 to hold a convention rather than a primary. With this decision, Gilmore said he was seriously considering a run for the Senate.

Gilmore formally announced his candidacy via a YouTube video on November 19, 2007. He said that he was running to give Virginia "a strong and steady hand" in the Senate.

Gilmore faced a challenge from his right in State Delegate Bob Marshall of Prince William County. Marshall charged Gilmore with being too soft on abortion. However, at the convention Gilmore won the nomination by a margin of only 65 votes out of 3,000 cast.

In the November election, Gilmore was heavily defeated, winning only 34 percent of the vote to Warner's 65 percent. Gilmore only carried four counties in the state – Rockingham, Augusta, Powhatan and Hanover. In many cases, he lost in many areas of the state that are normally reliably Republican. This was the worst showing for a Republican Senate candidate in Virginia since Chuck Robb defeated Maurice Dawkins with 71 percent of the vote in 1988.

=== 2016 presidential candidacy ===
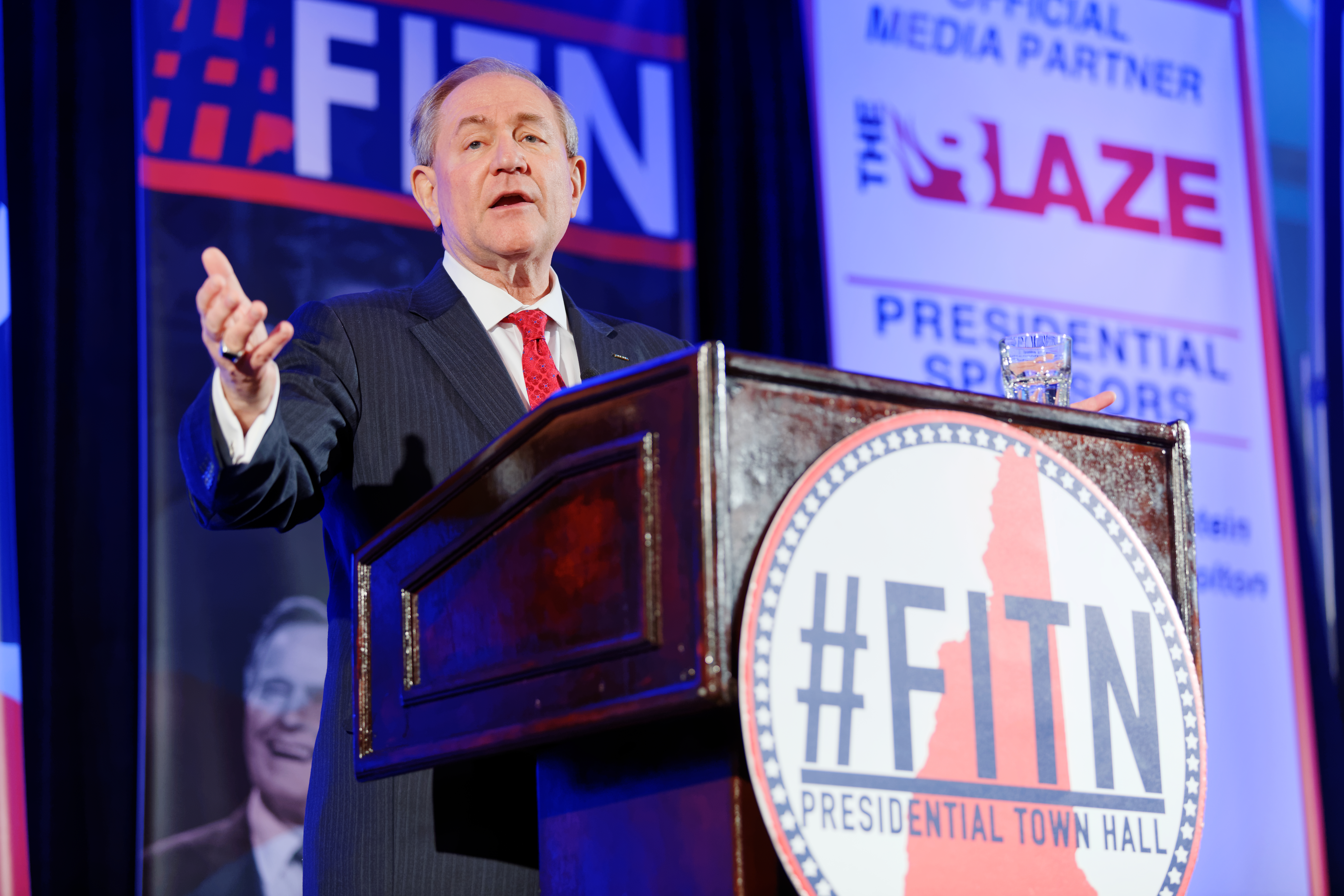
Gilmore campaigning in New Hampshire

On July 7, 2015, Gilmore told the Associated Press that he planned to announce his candidacy for the 2016 Republican presidential nomination in the first week of August 2015. On July 29, Gilmore filed his candidacy for President of the United States with the Federal Election Commission. He announced his candidacy via an internet video clip the next day. The same evening, he appeared on Special Report with Bret Baier as the "center seat" where panelists Charles Krauthammer, Julie Pace, and Steve Hayes questioned him on a variety of issues.

According to his campaign website, Gilmore's main issues that he would address if elected president include preserving the 2nd Amendment right to bear arms, immigration and border re-enforcement, healthcare reform, and restoring America's economy.

Gilmore was consistently one of the lowest-polling candidate in the 2016 GOP field. He rarely registered more than 1% in a national poll, often polling at 0%, and sometimes was not offered as a choice. This resulted in his polling at 0.0% in The Huffington Post aggregate poll, and lack of showings in the earlier Real Clear Politics aggregate poll. Gilmore failed to qualify for all but two of the "undercard" lower-tier debates. He was the only commonly polled candidate to be left out of more than one undercard debate. Gilmore insisted that he was "not going anywhere" and would continue to run.

On January 26, 2016, after being denied participation in five consecutive debates, Gilmore was invited back for the "undercard" debate on January 28, his first debate since August. This was the last debate before the Iowa caucuses. The "undercard" debates were discontinued after the Iowa Caucuses.

In the 2016 Iowa Republican caucuses, Gilmore received 12 votes, not earning him any delegates. He then received 133 votes in the New Hampshire primary. Gilmore indicated he intended to continue his campaign into South Carolina. However, he suspended his campaign a week before that primary, on February 12, 2016.

== Appointments and other positions ==
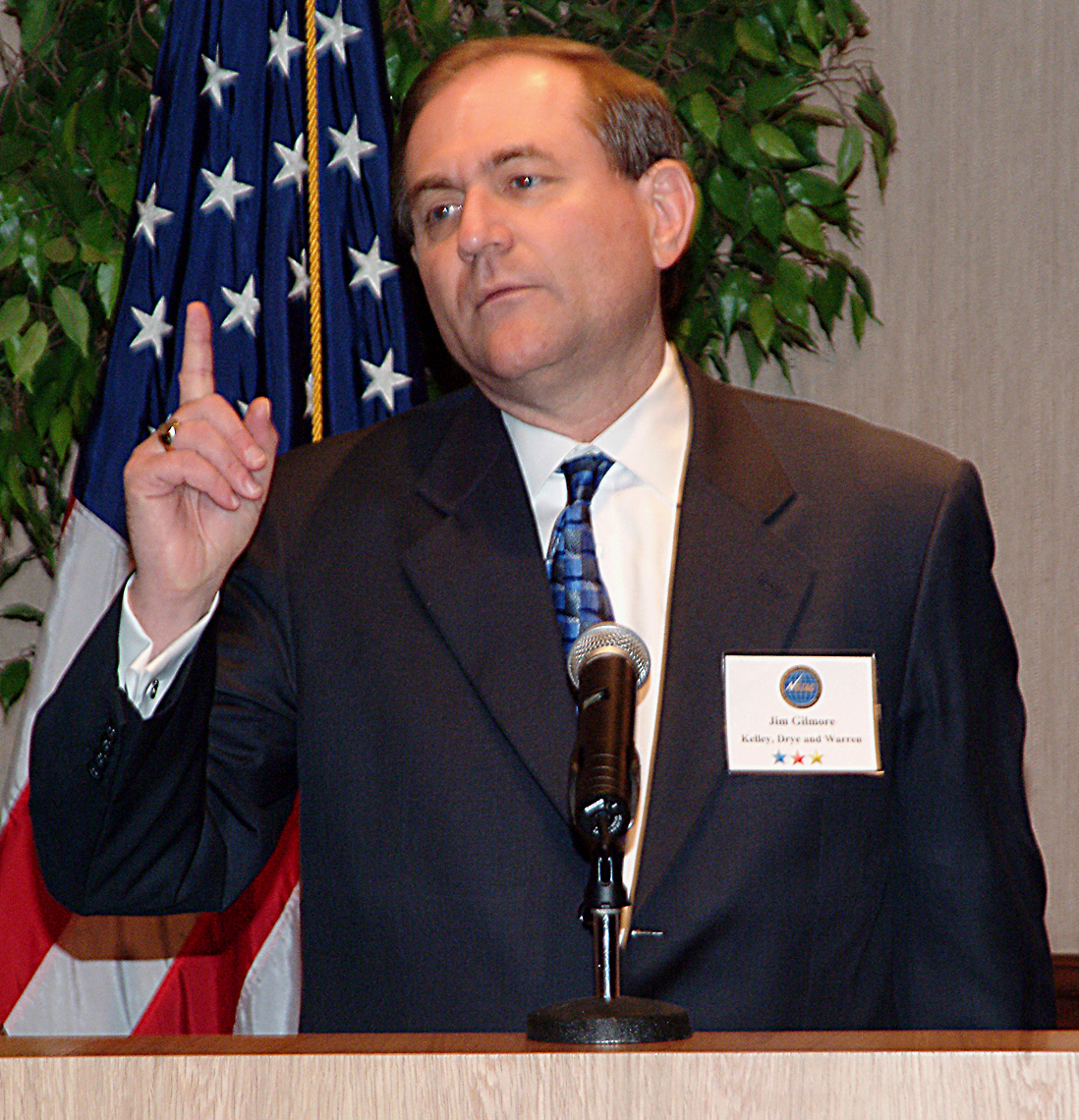
Gilmore taking questions during a 2004 National Security Telecommunications Advisory Committee meeting.

During his term as governor, Gilmore chaired the Congressional Advisory Commission on Electronic Commerce. The commission was charged with the task of making recommendations to the United States Congress on Internet taxation. The commission's Report to Congress opposed taxation of the Internet.

Gilmore served on the board of Windmill International, a government contractor previously accused of trying to secure fraudulent contracts in Iraq. His service on the board was not mentioned in his campaign filings, as required. Gilmore was never accused of wrongdoing regarding fraud committed in Windmill International's name.

From 1999 to 2003, Gilmore chaired the Congressional Advisory Panel to Assess Domestic Capabilities for Terrorism Involving Weapons of Mass Destruction, nicknamed the Gilmore Commission. It presented five reports to Presidents Bill Clinton and George W. Bush, and to Congress each December 15 from 1999 through 2003.

From January 2001 to January 2002, Gilmore was the Chairman of the Republican National Committee.

Gilmore is the President & CEO of the Free Congress Foundation, a conservative think tank which was founded by Paul Weyrich. Gilmore has re-branded the Free Congress Foundation into the American Opportunity Foundation.

Gilmore has also served as Chairman of the National Council on Readiness & Preparedness, a homeland security program focused on community involvement and public/private partnerships. He is also President of USA Secure, a non-profit homeland security think tank based in Washington, D.C.

From 2005 to 2017 he served on the board of directors of the National Rifle Association.

In 2021, Gilmore was interviewed, by contributors Christopher Lim and Kendall O'Donnell from the UK-based think-tank The Bruges Group on his time as United States Ambassador to the Organization for Security and Co-operation in Europe, the European Union, US - China relations, and the Biden Administration's foreign policy. Gilmore criticised the G7's B3W programme, saying there was "zero discussion of [B3W] in the United States", and described President Biden's relationship with European allies as "a lot of public messaging, to be polite, and a lot of talk, to be not so polite". Gilmore was praised for "asking hard-hitting, pertinent questions that need to be asked of the Biden Administration", and "reaffirming [his] place as one of the GOP's premier foreign policy minds"

=== Ambassador to the OSCE ===
Gilmore was considered for the position of United States Ambassador to Germany by the first Trump administration, but ultimately not chosen. In November 2018, Gilmore was nominated as the next U.S. Representative to the Organization for Security and Co-operation in Europe with the rank of ambassador. He was confirmed by the U.S. Senate on May 23, 2019. Gilmore took his oath of office on June 25, 2019 and presented his credentials to OSCE Secretary General Thomas Greminger on July 2, 2019.

== See also ==
- 2016 Republican Party presidential candidates

Legal offices
Preceded by Stephen Rosenthal	Attorney General of Virginia; 1994–1997	Succeeded by Richard Cullen
Party political offices
Preceded by George Allen	Republican nominee for Governor of Virginia; 1997	Succeeded by Mark Earley
Preceded by Ed Schafer	Chair of the Republican Governors Association; 2000–2001	Succeeded by Tom Ridge
Preceded by Jim Nicholson	Chair of the Republican National Committee; 2001	Succeeded by Marc Racicot
Political offices
Preceded by George Allen	Governor of Virginia; 1998–2002	Succeeded by Mark Warner
Diplomatic posts
Preceded by Kate Byrnes; Acting	United States Ambassador to the Organization for Security and Cooperation in Europe; 2019–2021	Succeeded by Courtney Austrian; Acting
U.S. order of precedence (ceremonial)
Preceded by Douglas Wilder as Former Governor	Order of precedence of the United States	Succeeded by Bob McDonnell as Former Governor
