= 2017 Virginia Attorney General election =

- November 7, 2017
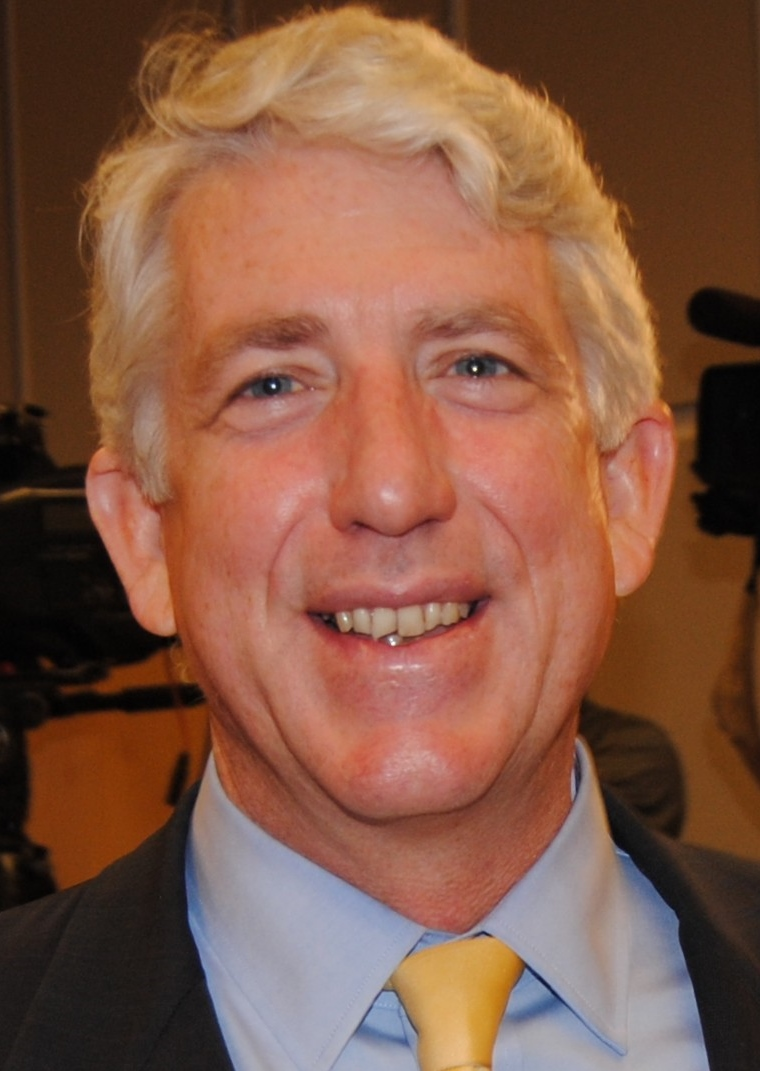

Nominee	Mark Herring	John Adams
Party	Democratic	Republican
Popular vote	1,385,390	1,209,540
Percentage	53.33%	46.56%
- Herring: 50–60% 60–70% 70–80% 80–90% >90% Adams: 40–50% 50–60% 60–70% 70–80% 80–90% >90% Tie: 40–50% 50% No votes
Attorney General before election
Mark Herring
Democratic
Elected Attorney General
Mark Herring
Democratic

The 2017 Virginia Attorney General election was held on November 7, 2017. The incumbent attorney general, Democrat Mark Herring, was expected to run for governor, but announced he would run for re-election instead. As only Herring and Republican John Adams qualified for their respective party primaries, the two automatically became their parties' nominees. In the general election, Herring defeated Adams to win a second term as Attorney General of Virginia.

== Democratic primary ==
=== Candidates ===
==== Nominee ====
- Mark Herring, incumbent Attorney General

== Republican primary ==
=== Candidates ===
==== Nominee ====
- John Adams, Navy veteran, McGuire Woods partner, former law clerk for Clarence Thomas, former Assistant United States Attorney and White House aide

==== Failed to qualify ====
- Chuck Smith, former chair of the Republican Party of Virginia Beach, candidate for VA-03 and candidate for Virginia Beach City Council

==== Withdrawn ====
- Rob Bell, state delegate and candidate in 2013

==== Declined ====
- Bill Stanley, state senator

=== Polling ===
Poll source	Date(s) administered	Sample size	Margin of error	John Adams	Rob Bell	Chuck Smith	Undecided
Public Opinion Strategies	September 18–21, 2016	800	± 3.46%	11%	16%	3%	69%

== General election ==
=== Predictions ===
Source	Ranking	As of
Sabato's Crystal Ball	Lean D	November 2, 2017

=== Candidates ===
- John Adams, Republican nominee
- Mark Herring, incumbent attorney general, Democratic nominee

=== Endorsements ===
John Adams (R)

Federal officials

- Tom Cotton, U.S. senator from Arkansas
- Mike Lee, U.S. senator from Utah
- Tim Scott, U.S. senator from South Carolina
- Sean Spicer, former White House Press Secretary
- John Warner, former U.S. senator from Virginia

Individuals

- Morton Blackwell, RNC national committeeman
- Kathy Hayden, former RNC national committeewoman

State officials

- Terry Austin, state delegate
- Dickey Bell, state delegate
- Dick Black, state senator
- Ken Blackwell, former mayor of Cincinnati, Ohio, 43rd Ohio State Treasurer, 51st Ohio Secretary of State
- Amanda Chase, state senator
- Ben Cline, state delegate, 24th district
- Vince Donoghue, Commonwealth's Attorney for Essex County
- Siobhan Dunnavant, state senator
- Nick Freitas, state delegate, 30th district
- Chris Head, state delegate
- William Howell, Speaker of the House of Delegates
- Terry Kilgore, state delegate
- Dave Larock, state delegate, 33rd district
- Scott Lingamfelter, state delegate
- Manoli Loupassi, state delegate
- Tim Martin, Commonwealth's Attorney for Augusta County
- Jason Miyares, state delegate
- Tommy Norment, State Senate Majority Leader
- Mark Obenshain, state senator, and candidate for attorney general in 2013
- Chris Peace, state delegate
- Nicole Price, former Commonwealth's Attorney for Washington County
- Roxann Robinson, state delegate, 27th district
- Javaid Siddiqi, former Virginia Secretary of Education
- Chris Stolle, state delegate
- Glen Sturtevant, state senator
- Lee Ware, state delegate

Local officials

- Rick Boyer, former member of the Board of Supervisors for Campbell County, Virginia
- Bill Campbell, Madison County Supervisor
- John Erbach, Chesterfield County School Board member
- Cindy Hall, Appomattox County School Board member
- Wayne Hazzard, Hanover County Supervisor
- Bob Martin, Carroll County Supervisor

Sheriffs

- Sheriff Mark R. Armentrout, Radford City
- Sheriff L. Mark Barrick, Mathews County
- Sheriff Michael J. Brown, Bedford County
- Sheriff David P. Bushey, Middlesex County
- Sheriff Timothy C. Carter, Shenandoah County
- Sheriff Michael L. Chapman, Loudoun County
- Sheriff Brian J. Craig, Floyd County
- Sheriff David P. "DP" Decatur, Jr., Stafford County
- Sheriff Robert J. Deeds, James City County/Williamsburg City
- Sheriff Steve F. Dempsey, King George County (I)
- Sheriff J.D. "Danny" Diggs, York County/Poquoson City
- Sheriff W. Keith Dunagan, Wythe County
- Sheriff C. Ray Foster, Buchanan County
- Sheriff John B. "J.B." Gardner, Carroll County
- Sheriff Bobby G. Hammons, Dickenson County
- Sheriff J.E. "Chip" Harding, Albemarle County
- Sheriff Joe Harris, Jr., Waynesboro City
- Sheriff R.W. "Bobby" Hawkins, Jr., Mecklenburg County
- Sheriff Glendell Hill, Prince William County
- Sheriff David R. Hines, Hanover County
- Sheriff Steve A. Hutcherson, Campbell County
- Sheriff Bryan F. Hutcheson, Rockingham County
- Sheriff Scott H. Jenkins, Culpeper County
- Sheriff W.G. "Billy" Kidd, Jr., Buckingham County
- Sheriff Karl S. Leonard, Chesterfield County
- Sheriff James R. "Doc" Lyons, Northumberland County
- Sheriff Patrick McCranie, Lancaster County
- Sheriff Daniel T. McEathron, Warren County
- Sheriff Robert P. "Bob" Mosier, Fauquier County
- Sheriff Brad W. Nunnally, Powhatan County
- Sheriff Ronnie Oakes, Wise County
- Sheriff J. Eric Orange, Roanoke County
- Sheriff Jim O'Sullivan, Chesapeake City
- Sheriff Gary B. Parsons, Lee County
- Sheriff C.H. "Hank" Partin, Montgomery County
- Sheriff Brian K. Roberts, Brunswick County
- Sheriff Matt Robertson, Staunton City
- Sheriff Donald T. Sloan, Lynchburg City
- Sheriff Steven S. Smith, Greene County
- Sheriff Ronald N. Sprinkle, Botetourt County
- Sheriff Kenneth W. Stolle, Virginia Beach City
- Sheriff J.B. "Jack" Stutts, Southampton County
- Sheriff Les R. Taylor, Winchester City
- Sheriff Michael W. "Mike" Taylor, Pittsylvania County
- Sheriff Richard A. Vaughan, Grayson County
- Sheriff Michael L. Wade, Henrico County
- Sheriff J.S. "Jeff" Walton, King William County
- Sheriff Darrell W. Warren, Jr., Gloucester County

Individuals

- Don Blake, chairman and president of Virginia Christian Alliance
- Rick Buchanan, chair of the Virginia Tea Party Patriots Federation
- Carly Fiorina, businesswoman

Organizations

- Constitution Party of Virginia
- National Federation of Independent Business
- NRA Political Victory Fund
- Republican Attorneys General Association
- Susan B. Anthony List
- Tea Party Nation
- Virginia Farm Bureau
- Virginia Fraternal Order of Police
- Virginia Police Benevolent Association
- Virginia Society for Human Life

Newspapers

- Chatham Star-Tribune
- The Free Lance–Star
- Harrisonburg Daily News Record
- Richmond Times-Dispatch
- The Winchester Star
Mark Herring (D)

Federal officials

- Don Beyer, U.S. representative from Virginia
- Hillary Clinton, former U.S. Secretary of State and 2016 presidential nominee
- Kamala Harris, U.S. senator from California and former California Attorney General
- Tim Kaine, U.S. senator from Virginia
- Tom Perriello, former U.S. representative from Virginia
- Mark Warner, U.S. senator from Virginia

State officials

- Muriel Bowser, mayor of Washington, D.C.
- Howard Dean, former governor of Vermont
- Justin Fairfax, 2017 nominee for lieutenant governor of Virginia
- Alison Lundergan Grimes, Secretary of State of Kentucky
- Jaime Harrison, chair of the South Carolina Democratic Party
- Terry McAuliffe, governor of Virginia
- Ralph Northam, lieutenant governor of Virginia and 2017 nominee for Governor of Virginia

Sheriffs

- Sheriff Timothy A. Allen, Roanoke City
- Sheriff H. E. "Bucky" Allin, III, Prince George County
- Sheriff Mark A. Amos, Orange County
- Sheriff Beth Arthur, Arlington County
- Sheriff C. O. Balderson, Westmoreland County
- Sheriff Joe Baron, Norfolk
- Sheriff S. Stephen Bittle, Falls Church
- Sheriff Christopher Blalock, Rockbridge County
- Sheriff Sam C. Brown, Emporia
- Sheriff James E. Brown, III, Charlottesville
- Sheriff John R. Charboneau, King and Queen County
- Sheriff Vanessa R. Crawford, Petersburg
- Sheriff Steve M. Draper, Martinsville
- Sheriff Steven L. Dye, Russell County
- Sheriff Kevin Hall, Alleghany County
- Sheriff W. Randolph Hamilton, Jr., Buena Vista
- Sheriff Roger L. Harris, Spotsylvania County
- Sheriff Paul Higgs, Fredericksburg
- Sheriff Darrell L. Hodges, Cumberland County
- Sheriff William T. "Tim" Jarratt, Jr., Greensville County
- Sheriff Thomas D. Jones, Charlotte County
- Sheriff Alan M. Jones, Sr, Charles City County
- Sheriff Stacey A. Kincaid, Fairfax County
- Sheriff Dana A. Lawhorne, Alexandria
- Sheriff A. A. "Tony" Lippa, Caroline County
- Sheriff Mark A. Marshall, Isle of Wight County
- Sheriff L. W. "Lenny" Millholland, Frederick County
- Sheriff Michael Mondul, Danville
- Sheriff Gabe A. Morgan, Newport News
- Sheriff David Neil, Highland County
- Sheriff Fred P. Newman, Washington County
- Sheriff W. Q. "Bill" Overton, Jr., Franklin County
- Sheriff W. John Puckett, Scott County
- Sheriff Wesley W. Reed, Prince Edward County
- Sheriff B. J. Roberts, Hampton
- Sheriff Anthony W. "Tony" Roper, Clarke County
- Sheriff B. C. "Chip" Shuler, Smyth County
- Sheriff Stephan B. Smith, Richmond County
- Sheriff Arthur Townsend Jr., Lunenburg County
- Sheriff Carlos Turner, Surry County
- Sheriff Ernest "E. W." Viar, Jr, Amherst County
- Sheriff Jack Weisenburger, Bristol
- Sheriff C. T. Woody, Jr., Richmond City

Organizations

- Americans for Responsible Solutions
- CASA in Action
- Equality Virginia
- Equality Virginia PAC
- Human Rights Campaign
- LGBT Democrats of Virginia
- NARAL Pro-Choice Virginia
- Northern Virginia Chamber of Commerce
- Planned Parenthood Advocates of Virginia
- Sierra Club
- Virginia AFL-CIO
- Virginia Education Association
- Virginia League of Conservation Voters
- Virginia National Organization for Women
- Virginia Professional Fire Fighters
- Virginia Sierra Club

Newspapers

- Daily Press
- The Virginian-Pilot

=== Polling ===
==== Polls ====
Poll source	Date(s) administered	Sample size	Margin of error	Mark Herring (D)	John Adams (R)	Other	Undecided
Change Research	November 2–5, 2017	3,648	± 1.6%	51%	45%	—	4%
The Polling Company (R)	November 2–5, 2017	800	± 3.5%	44%	45%	—	9%
Christopher Newport University	October 29 – November 4, 2017	839	± 3.5%	49%	45%	—	6%
Gravis Marketing	October 30 – November 3, 2017	1,143	± 2.9%	48%	42%	—	10%
The Polling Company (R)	October 30 – November 2, 2017	800	± 3.5%	42%	43%	—	12%
Roanoke College	October 29 – November 2, 2017	781	± 3.5%	46%	46%	—	8%
Suffolk University	October 30 – November 1, 2017	500	± 4.4%	44%	42%	—	13%
Washington Post/Schar School	October 26–29, 2017	921	± 4.0%	51%	43%	—	5%
The Polling Company (R)	October 23–26, 2017	800	± 3.5%	43%	43%	—	11%
Christopher Newport University	October 20–25, 2017	812	± 3.8%	49%	44%	—	7%
Roanoke College	October 8–13, 2017	607	± 4.0%	47%	42%	—	10%
Christopher Newport University	October 2–6, 2017	928	± 4.3%	51%	40%	—	9%
Washington Post/Schar School Poll	September 28 – October 2, 2017	720 LV	± 4.5%	52%	41%	—	5%
Washington Post/Schar School Poll	September 28 – October 2, 2017	1,000 RV	± 3.5%	50%	39%	—	6%
Public Policy Polling	September 21–23, 2017	849	± 3.8%	46%	38%	—	16%
Christopher Newport University	September 12–22, 2017	776	± 3.7%	47%	42%	—	11%
Suffolk University	September 13–17, 2017	500	± 4.4%	39%	37%	—	23%
Mason-Dixon	September 10–15, 2017	625	± 4.0%	45%	36%	—	19%
University of Mary Washington	September 5–12, 2017	562 LV	± 5.2%	47%	40%	—	10%
University of Mary Washington	September 5–12, 2017	867 RV	± 4.1%	47%	38%	—	12%
Virginia Commonwealth University	July 17–25, 2017	538 LV	± 5.1%	45%	39%	—	15%
Virginia Commonwealth University	July 17–25, 2017	707 RV	± 4.5%	43%	36%	—	17%

=== Results ===
2017 Virginia Attorney General election
Party	Candidate	Votes	%	±%
Democratic	Mark Herring (incumbent)	1,385,390	53.33	+3.43
Republican	John Adams	1,209,540	46.56	–3.31
Write-in		2,614	0.10	–0.12
Total votes		2,597,544	100.00	N/A
Democratic hold				

==== By counties and independent city ====
Locality	Mark Herring Democratic		John Adams Republican		Write-in Various		Margin		Total votes cast
Locality	#	%	#	%	#	%	#	%	Total votes cast
Accomack	4,521	42.94%	6,003	57.01%	5	0.05%	−1,482	−14.08%	10,529
Albemarle	26,594	63.23%	15,439	36.71%	26	0.06%	11,155	26.52%	42,059
Alexandria	40,306	77.78%	11,463	22.12%	54	0.10%	28,843	55.66%	51,823
Alleghany	1,487	33.98%	2,886	65.95%	3	0.07%	−1,399	−31.97%	4,376
Amelia	1,391	30.34%	3,190	69.59%	3	0.07%	−1,799	−39.25%	4,584
Amherst	3,232	33.29%	6,462	66.56%	14	0.14%	−3,230	−33.27%	9,708
Appomattox	1,219	23.66%	3,929	76.26%	4	0.08%	−2,710	−52.60%	5,152
Arlington	67,190	79.36%	17,383	20.53%	89	0.11%	49,807	58.83%	84,662
Augusta	5,911	25.20%	17,536	74.75%	13	0.06%	−11,625	−49.55%	23,460
Bath	449	30.75%	1,009	69.11%	2	0.14%	−560	−38.36%	1,460
Bedford	6,804	24.63%	20,800	75.28%	26	0.09%	−13,996	−50.66%	27,630
Bland	387	18.83%	1,666	81.07%	2	0.10%	−1,279	−62.24%	2,055
Botetourt	3,332	26.78%	9,095	73.10%	15	0.12%	−5,763	−46.32%	12,442
Bristol	1,191	28.13%	3,040	71.80%	3	0.07%	−1,849	−43.67%	4,234
Brunswick	2,698	57.29%	2,011	42.71%	0	0.00%	687	14.59%	4,709
Buchanan	1,106	25.00%	3,314	74.91%	4	0.09%	−2,208	−49.91%	4,424
Buckingham	1,913	41.78%	2,663	58.16%	3	0.07%	−750	−16.38%	4,579
Buena Vista	537	33.42%	1,068	66.46%	2	0.12%	−531	−33.04%	1,607
Campbell	4,364	25.29%	12,879	74.63%	14	0.08%	−8,515	−49.34%	17,257
Caroline	4,082	49.04%	4,234	50.87%	7	0.08%	−152	−1.83%	8,323
Carroll	1,867	22.71%	6,350	77.23%	5	0.06%	−4,483	−54.52%	8,222
Charles City	1,683	62.20%	1,020	37.69%	3	0.11%	663	24.50%	2,706
Charlotte	1,416	35.51%	2,565	64.32%	7	0.18%	−1,149	−28.81%	3,988
Charlottesville	13,725	84.49%	2,498	15.38%	21	0.13%	11,227	69.11%	16,244
Chesapeake	37,506	52.05%	34,486	47.86%	60	0.08%	3,020	4.19%	72,052
Chesterfield	57,559	48.67%	60,616	51.25%	96	0.08%	−3,057	−2.58%	118,271
Clarke	2,409	43.51%	3,122	56.38%	6	0.11%	−713	−12.88%	5,537
Colonial Heights	1,419	27.70%	3,700	72.24%	3	0.06%	−2,281	−44.53%	5,122
Covington	543	40.74%	788	59.11%	2	0.15%	−245	−18.38%	1,333
Craig	430	23.48%	1,401	76.52%	0	0.00%	−971	−53.03%	1,831
Culpeper	4,938	36.56%	8,553	63.32%	16	0.12%	−3,614	−26.76%	13,507
Cumberland	1,258	40.36%	1,856	59.54%	3	0.10%	−598	−19.19%	3,117
Danville	6,208	56.94%	4,685	42.97%	10	0.09%	1,523	13.97%	10,903
Dickenson	958	28.10%	2,446	71.75%	5	0.15%	−1,488	−43.65%	3,409
Dinwiddie	3,680	44.41%	4,602	55.53%	5	0.06%	−922	−11.13%	8,287
Emporia	913	56.29%	708	43.65%	1	0.06%	205	12.64%	1,622
Essex	1,700	45.96%	1,997	53.99%	2	0.05%	−297	−8.03%	3,699
Fairfax City	5,303	64.50%	2,911	35.41%	8	0.10%	2,392	29.09%	8,222
Fairfax County	251,486	67.21%	122,291	32.68%	402	0.11%	129,195	34.53%	374,179
Falls Church	4,653	77.97%	1,307	21.90%	8	0.13%	3,346	56.07%	5,968
Fauquier	9,329	38.90%	14,615	60.94%	38	0.16%	−5,286	−22.04%	23,982
Floyd	1,922	35.22%	3,531	64.71%	4	0.07%	−1,609	−29.49%	5,457
Fluvanna	4,243	46.21%	4,935	53.75%	4	0.04%	−692	−7.54%	9,182
Franklin City	1,533	60.14%	1,015	39.82%	1	0.04%	518	20.32%	2,549
Franklin County	5,230	30.01%	12,179	69.89%	18	0.10%	−6,949	−39.87%	17,427
Frederick	8,374	34.57%	15,830	65.35%	19	0.08%	−7,456	−30.78%	24,223
Fredericksburg	4,584	64.19%	2,549	35.70%	8	0.11%	2,035	28.50%	7,141
Galax	401	29.90%	933	69.57%	7	0.52%	−532	−39.67%	1,341
Giles	1,648	28.68%	4,097	71.29%	2	0.03%	−2,449	−42.61%	5,747
Gloucester	4,134	32.92%	8,418	67.03%	6	0.05%	−4,284	−34.11%	12,558
Goochland	3,788	36.05%	6,712	63.88%	8	0.08%	−2,924	−27.83%	10,508
Grayson	1,052	23.39%	3,440	76.50%	5	0.11%	−2,388	−53.10%	4,497
Greene	2,283	36.46%	3,977	63.51%	2	0.03%	−1,694	−27.05%	6,262
Greensville	1,651	57.51%	1,219	42.46%	1	0.03%	432	15.05%	2,871
Halifax	4,023	39.07%	6,270	60.89%	5	0.05%	−2,247	−21.82%	10,298
Hampton	28,499	71.01%	11,583	28.86%	50	0.12%	16,916	42.15%	40,132
Hanover	14,365	33.39%	28,590	66.46%	65	0.15%	−14,225	−33.07%	43,020
Harrisonburg	6,430	62.95%	3,769	36.90%	15	0.15%	2,661	26.05%	10,214
Henrico	68,787	59.99%	45,756	39.91%	114	0.10%	23,031	20.09%	114,657
Henry	4,870	34.92%	9,073	65.05%	5	0.04%	−4,203	−30.13%	13,948
Highland	334	32.30%	699	67.60%	1	0.10%	−365	−35.30%	1,034
Hopewell	2,682	49.49%	2,721	50.21%	16	0.30%	−39	−0.72%	5,419
Isle of Wight	5,758	40.95%	8,289	58.95%	14	0.10%	−2,531	−18.00%	14,061
James City	14,944	47.26%	16,648	52.65%	29	0.09%	−1,704	−5.39%	31,621
King and Queen	1,024	41.56%	1,438	58.36%	2	0.08%	−414	−16.80%	2,464
King George	2,611	36.69%	4,499	63.21%	7	0.10%	−1,888	−26.53%	7,117
King William	1,991	33.50%	3,945	66.38%	7	0.12%	−1,954	−32.88%	5,943
Lancaster	2,010	42.13%	2,757	57.79%	4	0.08%	−747	−15.66%	4,771
Lee	1,336	20.31%	5,235	79.58%	7	0.11%	−3,899	−59.27%	6,578
Lexington	1,129	65.00%	606	34.89%	2	0.12%	523	30.11%	1,737
Loudoun	69,514	59.50%	47,220	40.42%	90	0.08%	22,294	19.08%	116,824
Louisa	4,424	37.69%	7,305	62.23%	10	0.09%	−2,881	−24.54%	11,739
Lunenburg	1,467	40.42%	2,159	59.49%	3	0.08%	−692	−19.07%	3,629
Lynchburg	9,822	46.56%	11,248	53.32%	24	0.11%	−1,426	−6.76%	21,094
Madison	1,756	35.92%	3,126	63.95%	6	0.12%	−1,370	−28.03%	4,888
Manassas	5,255	56.75%	3,999	43.19%	6	0.06%	1,256	13.56%	9,260
Manassas Park	1,947	63.61%	1,112	36.33%	2	0.07%	835	27.28%	3,061
Martinsville	2,179	59.07%	1,505	40.80%	5	0.14%	674	18.27%	3,689
Mathews	1,330	33.95%	2,583	65.93%	5	0.13%	−1,253	−31.98%	3,918
Mecklenburg	3,348	39.30%	5,172	60.70%	0	0.00%	−1,824	−21.41%	8,520
Middlesex	1,567	36.48%	2,725	63.43%	4	0.09%	−1,158	−26.96%	4,296
Montgomery	14,870	53.21%	13,057	46.72%	19	0.07%	1,813	6.49%	27,946
Nelson	3,023	49.47%	3,081	50.42%	7	0.11%	−58	−0.95%	6,111
New Kent	2,637	30.96%	5,868	68.89%	13	0.15%	−3,231	−37.93%	8,518
Newport News	29,760	63.87%	16,779	36.01%	58	0.12%	12,981	27.86%	46,597
Norfolk	38,430	72.15%	14,763	27.72%	68	0.13%	23,667	44.44%	53,261
Northampton	2,297	53.28%	2,011	46.65%	3	0.07%	286	6.63%	4,311
Northumberland	1,983	37.33%	3,326	62.61%	3	0.06%	−1,343	−25.28%	5,312
Norton	281	33.10%	567	66.78%	1	0.12%	−286	−33.69%	849
Nottoway	1,774	41.95%	2,452	57.98%	3	0.07%	−678	−16.03%	4,229
Orange	4,095	37.72%	6,754	62.21%	8	0.07%	−2,659	−24.49%	10,857
Page	1,806	27.19%	4,829	72.71%	6	0.09%	−3,023	−45.52%	6,641
Patrick	1,283	23.05%	4,277	76.83%	7	0.13%	−2,994	−53.78%	5,567
Petersburg	7,097	87.60%	995	12.28%	10	0.12%	6,102	75.31%	8,102
Pittsylvania	5,727	29.45%	13,708	70.50%	10	0.05%	−7,981	−41.04%	19,445
Poquoson	1,261	26.27%	3,531	73.56%	8	0.17%	−2,270	−47.29%	4,800
Portsmouth	19,884	69.84%	8,550	30.03%	38	0.13%	11,334	39.81%	28,472
Powhatan	3,017	26.31%	8,443	73.64%	6	0.05%	−5,426	−47.32%	11,466
Prince Edward	2,831	50.47%	2,767	49.33%	11	0.20%	64	1.14%	5,609
Prince George	4,099	40.04%	6,128	59.86%	10	0.10%	−2,029	−19.82%	10,237
Prince William	73,909	60.46%	48,172	39.41%	166	0.14%	25,737	21.05%	122,247
Pulaski	3,590	30.82%	8,042	69.05%	15	0.13%	−4,452	−38.22%	11,647
Radford	2,142	54.97%	1,747	44.83%	8	0.21%	395	10.14%	3,897
Rappahannock	1,498	45.89%	1,762	53.98%	4	0.12%	−264	−8.09%	3,264
Richmond City	57,170	80.79%	13,518	19.10%	76	0.11%	43,652	61.69%	70,764
Richmond County	856	36.29%	1,503	63.71%	0	0.00%	−647	−27.43%	2,359
Roanoke City	14,934	61.91%	9,169	38.01%	18	0.07%	5,765	23.90%	24,121
Roanoke County	12,182	36.76%	20,904	63.08%	53	0.16%	−8,722	−26.32%	33,139
Rockbridge	2,907	36.99%	4,946	62.93%	6	0.08%	−2,039	−25.94%	7,859
Rockingham	6,943	27.66%	18,138	72.27%	17	0.07%	−11,195	−44.61%	25,098
Russell	1,483	22.30%	5,160	77.59%	7	0.11%	−3,677	−55.29%	6,650
Salem	3,061	37.67%	5,058	62.25%	6	0.07%	−1,997	−24.58%	8,125
Scott	1,096	18.04%	4,972	81.82%	9	0.15%	−3,876	−63.78%	6,077
Shenandoah	3,914	29.69%	9,258	70.22%	12	0.09%	−5,344	−40.53%	13,184
Smyth	1,718	21.83%	6,149	78.14%	2	0.03%	−4,431	−56.31%	7,869
Southampton	2,517	41.10%	3,603	58.83%	4	0.07%	−1,086	−17.73%	6,124
Spotsylvania	15,713	42.91%	20,869	56.99%	37	0.10%	−5,156	−14.08%	36,619
Stafford	18,705	46.27%	21,684	53.64%	38	0.09%	−2,979	−7.37%	40,427
Staunton	3,990	53.04%	3,522	46.82%	11	0.15%	468	6.22%	7,523
Suffolk	16,344	57.65%	11,988	42.29%	16	0.06%	4,356	15.37%	28,348
Surry	1,637	55.55%	1,307	44.35%	3	0.10%	330	11.20%	2,947
Sussex	1,797	55.57%	1,437	44.43%	0	0.00%	360	11.13%	3,234
Tazewell	1,890	18.91%	8,087	80.92%	17	0.17%	−6,197	−62.01%	9,994
Virginia Beach	63,787	50.13%	63,334	49.77%	126	0.10%	453	0.36%	127,247
Warren	3,567	34.61%	6,726	65.27%	12	0.12%	−3,159	−30.66%	10,305
Washington	3,937	24.18%	12,334	75.74%	14	0.09%	−8,397	−51.56%	16,285
Waynesboro	2,615	44.85%	3,211	55.08%	4	0.07%	−596	−10.22%	5,830
Westmoreland	2,427	45.71%	2,879	54.22%	4	0.08%	−452	−8.51%	5,310
Williamsburg	3,689	70.37%	1,549	29.55%	4	0.08%	2,140	40.82%	5,242
Winchester	3,543	53.78%	3,039	46.13%	6	0.09%	504	7.65%	6,588
Wise	1,886	22.18%	6,607	77.71%	9	0.11%	−4,721	−55.53%	8,502
Wythe	2,146	25.44%	6,280	74.43%	11	0.13%	−4,134	−49.00%	8,437
York	9,700	42.21%	13,246	57.63%	37	0.16%	−3,546	−15.43%	22,983
Totals	1,385,390	53.33%	1,209,540	46.56%	2,614	0.10%	175,850	6.77%	2,597,544

Counties and independent cities that flipped from Democratic to Republican

- Caroline (largest city: Bowling Green)
- Nelson (largest city: Nellysford)

Counties and independent cities that flipped from Republican to Democratic

- Chesapeake (independent city)
- Danville (independent city)
- Montgomery (largest city: Blacksburg)
- Radford (independent city)
- Staunton (independent city)
- Virginia Beach (independent city)
- Winchester (independent city)

==== By congressional district ====
District	Herring	Adams	Representative
1st	44%	56%	Rob Wittman
2nd	49.8%	50.1%	Scott Taylor
3rd	67%	33%	Bobby Scott
4th	61%	39%	Donald McEachin
5th	45%	55%	Tom Garrett
6th	38%	62%	Bob Goodlatte
7th	47%	53%	Dave Brat
8th	75%	25%	Don Beyer
9th	31%	69%	Morgan Griffith
10th	55%	45%	Barbara Comstock
11th	69%	30%	Gerry Connolly

== See also ==
- 2017 Virginia elections
- 2017 Virginia gubernatorial election
- 2017 Virginia lieutenant gubernatorial election
- 2017 United States gubernatorial elections
