= Mark Herring =

American lawyer and politician

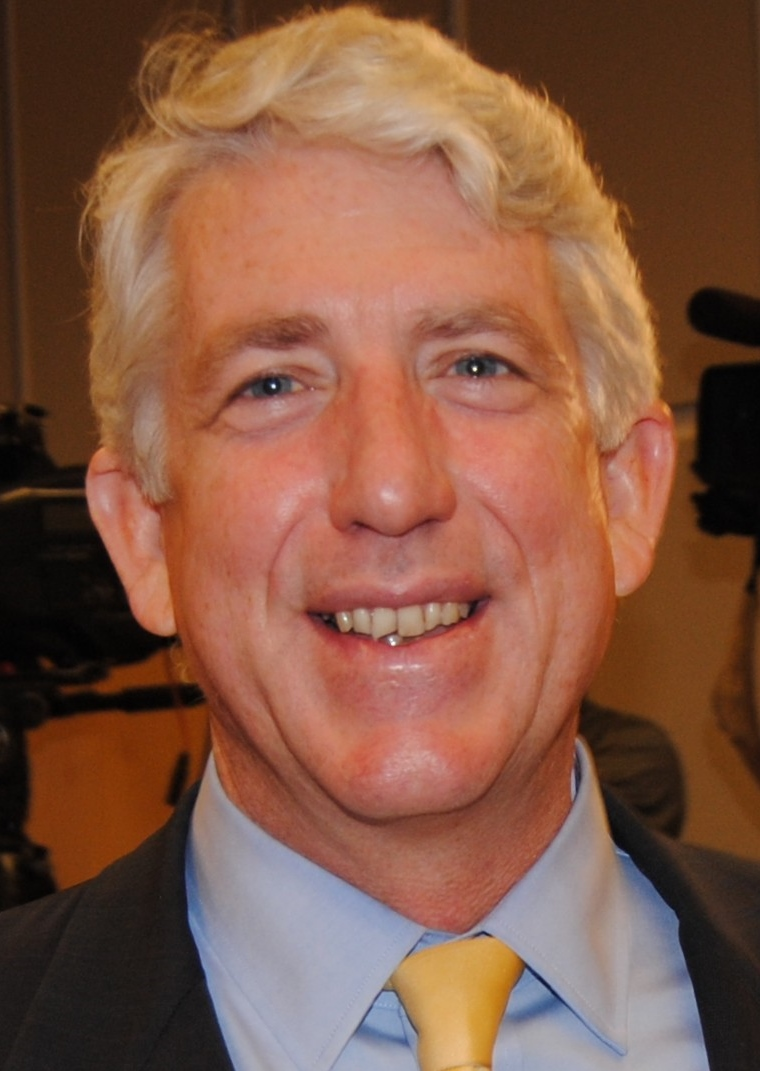
- Herring in 2013

47th Attorney General of Virginia
- In office January 11, 2014 – January 15, 2022
- Governor: Terry McAuliffe; Ralph Northam
- Preceded by: Ken Cuccinelli
- Succeeded by: Jason Miyares

Member of the Virginia Senate from the 33rd district
- In office February 1, 2006 – January 11, 2014
- Preceded by: Bill Mims
- Succeeded by: Jennifer Wexton

Member of the Loudoun County Board of Supervisors from the Leesburg district
- In office January 1, 2000 – December 31, 2003
- Preceded by: Joan Rokus
- Succeeded by: Jim Clem

Personal details
- Born: Mark Rankin Herring; September 25, 1961 (age 64) Johnson City, Tennessee, U.S.
- Party: Democratic
- Spouse: Laura Herring (m. 1990)
- Children: 2
- Relatives: Charles L. Waddell (step-father)
- Education: University of Virginia (BA, MA); University of Richmond (JD)

Mark Rankin Herring (born September 25, 1961) is an American politician and lawyer who served as the 47th attorney general of Virginia from 2014 to 2022. A member of the Democratic Party, he previously served in the Senate of Virginia for the 33rd district, made up of parts of Fairfax and Loudoun counties, from 2006 to 2014. In 2021, Herring lost his bid for a third term as Attorney General to Republican state delegate Jason Miyares.

Herring was the first Democratic Attorney General of Virginia since 1994.

== Early life and education ==
Herring was born in Johnson City, Tennessee, and moved to Leesburg, Virginia at the age of 12. Raised by Jane Rankin Herring, a single mother, he graduated from Loudoun Valley High School in 1979 and worked in construction and many other jobs to pay for college. He eventually obtained a Bachelor of Arts, majoring in foreign affairs and economics at the University of Virginia. He also obtained a Master of Arts in foreign affairs from UVA. He later obtained a J.D. from the University of Richmond School of Law.

== Early career ==
He served in elected office on the Loudoun County Board of Supervisors from 2000 to 2003, and was the town attorney for Lovettsville, Virginia, from 1992 to 1999.

Herring was elected to the Senate of Virginia in a special election triggered by Republican Bill Mims' appointment as chief deputy attorney general of Virginia. He was re-elected to a full term in the 2007 election, and re-elected again in 2011.

He is the principal with The Herring Law Firm, P.C., in Leesburg, Virginia.

== Attorney General of Virginia ==
=== Elections ===
==== 2013 ====
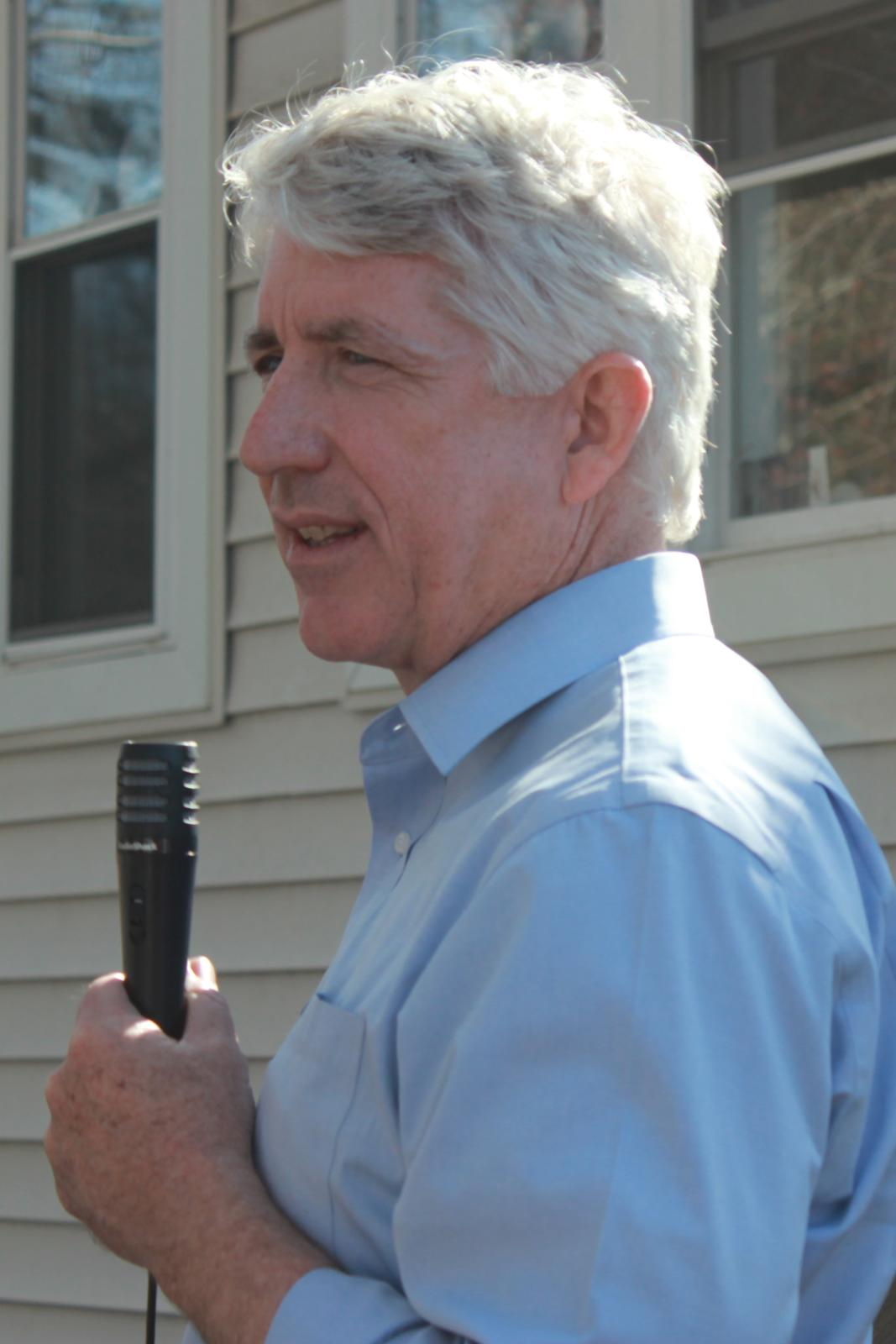
Herring delivering remarks during his 2013 campaign

On July 24, 2012, he announced that he would run for the office of Attorney General of Virginia, in the 2013 elections. On April 2, 2013, the Democratic Party of Virginia certified that Herring's name would appear on the June primary ballot. Herring defeated Justin Fairfax in the Democratic primary on June 11, 2013, winning narrowly by a margin of 52% to 48%.

He faced Republican Mark Obenshain in the general election. On the night of the election, Obenshain held a 1,200-vote lead over Herring. Vote totals fluctuated as ballots were canvassed in the following days, and the race remained too close to call. On November 12, 2013, with all ballots counted, Herring held a 165-vote lead, or less than 0.01%, and Obenshain requested a recount. Herring's total increased during the recount, so Obenshain conceded the election on December 18, 2013, and later that day, the recount ended with Herring winning by 907 votes, or 0.04%. Herring was sworn into office on January 11, 2014.

==== 2017 ====
Herring faced no opposition in the Democratic primary and won his party's endorsement for re-election. He defeated Republican opponent John Donley Adams and won re-election by 53% to 47%.

==== 2021 ====
On September 2, 2020, Herring announced that he would be seeking re-election as attorney general instead of running for governor. On November 2, 2021, Herring lost his reelection bid to Republican challenger Jason Miyares, a Virginia House delegate. He slightly outperformed the other candidates Terry McAuliffe and Hala Ayala, who were all on the Democratic ticket.

=== Tenure ===
==== Virginia Marriage Amendment ====
On January 23, 2014, Herring announced that he would not defend the Virginia Marriage Amendment in federal court, and filed a brief in a federal lawsuit being brought against the law asking for it to be struck down. Herring said in a press conference announcing the move, "I believe the freedom to marry is a fundamental right and I intend to ensure that Virginia is on the right side of history and the right side of the law."

Reaction to the announcement was mainly along party lines, with Democrats mostly praising the move and Republicans mostly criticizing it as violating his oath of office. The National Organization for Marriage has called for Herring's impeachment, claiming that the Virginia attorney general is obligated to defend all state laws against challenges. In the press conference, Herring said, "There are those who will say that the attorney general is required to defend every challenge to a state law, even a law that is unconstitutional. They could not be more wrong."

The U.S. District Court in Norfolk ruled the amendment unconstitutional in the case Bostic v. Schaefer on February 13, 2014. On July 28, 2014, the Fourth Circuit Court of Appeals issued a 2–1 opinion upholding the lower court's decision. This was appealed to the Supreme Court of the United States, which denied a writ of certiorari, letting the Fourth Circuit Court's decision stand and legalizing same-sex marriage in Virginia.

==== Gerrymandering case ====
In 2019, Mark Herring and the Democratic Party won their case against gerrymandering in Virginia elections when the U.S. Supreme Court dismissed the Virginia House GOP's appeal.

==== Blackface controversy ====
A few days after the controversy began over a blackface picture appearing on Ralph Northam's page in a 1984 medical school yearbook in the context of the 2019 Virginia political crisis, Herring admitted to an incident in which he also wore blackface:

In 1980, when I was a 19-year-old undergraduate in college (at the University of Virginia), some friends suggested we attend a party dressed like rappers we listened to at the time, like Kurtis Blow, and perform a song.

Herring had previously called on Northam to resign after the discovery of Northam's yearbook page, saying, "It is no longer possible for Governor Northam to lead our Commonwealth, and it is time for him to step down." He later clarified that the discovery of the yearbook page was not the reason he called for Northam's resignation; he did so because Northam had initially admitted to appearing in the photo, but the following day, "came out with a different and contradictory account, and that was when there was an erosion of trust."

==== Healthcare case ====
As attorney general of the Commonwealth of Virginia, Mark Herring took the case for Obamacare to the United States Supreme Court.

==== Advanced Towing case ====
On June 25, 2020, Herring filed a lawsuit against Advanced Towing Company, LLC, a towing and recovery operator based in Arlington, Virginia. The Complaint alleges that Advanced Towing has violated Virginia and Arlington County towing code provisions, resulting in towing conduct that is “frequently predatory, aggressive, overreaching and illegal.” Virginia State Senator Chap Peterson represented Advanced Towing in the case.

== Personal life ==
Herring and his wife Laura live in Leesburg, Virginia. They have two adult children, daughter Peyton and son Tim. His step-father was former state Senator Charlie Waddell.

== Electoral history ==
=== Board of Supervisors ===
1999

1999 Loudoun County Board of Supervisors Leesburg district general election
| Party | Candidate | Votes | % |
|---|---|---|---|
| Democratic | Mark Herring | 1,655 | 54.10 |
| Republican | James E. Clem | 1,404 | 45.90 |
| Total votes | | 3,059 | 100.00 |

=== State Senate ===
2003

2003 Virginia State Senate 27th district general election
| Party | Candidate | Votes | % |
|---|---|---|---|
| Republican | Russ Potts (incumbent) | 26,152 | 58.18 |
| Democratic | Mark Herring | 18,460 | 41.07 |
| Write-in | | 335 | 0.75 |
| Total votes | | 44,947 | 100.00 |

2006

2006 Virginia State Senate 33rd district special election
| Party | Candidate | Votes | % |
|---|---|---|---|
| Democratic | Mark Herring | 12,381 | 61.63 |
| Republican | D.M. Staton, Jr. | 7,689 | 38.27 |
| Write-in | | 20 | 0.10 |
| Total votes | | 20,090 | 100.00 |

2007

2007 Virginia State Senate 33rd district election
| Party | Candidate | Votes | % |
|---|---|---|---|
| Democratic | Mark Herring (incumbent) | 27,784 | 56.89 |
| Republican | Patricia Phillips | 20,994 | 42.99 |
| Write-in | | 55 | 0.11 |
| Total votes | | 48,833 | 100.00 |

2011

2011 Virginia State Senate 33rd district election
| Party | Candidate | Votes | % |
|---|---|---|---|
| Democratic | Mark Herring (incumbent) | 14,061 | 54.06 |
| Republican | Patricia Phillips | 11,915 | 45.81 |
| Write-in | | 30 | 0.11 |
| Total votes | | 26,006 | 100.00 |

=== Attorney General ===
2013

2013 Virginia Attorney General Democratic primary election
| Party | Candidate | Votes | % |
|---|---|---|---|
| Democratic | Mark Herring | 72,861 | 51.66 |
| Democratic | Justin Fairfax | 68,177 | 48.34 |
| Total votes | | 141,038 | 100.00 |

2013 Virginia Attorney General election
| Party | Candidate | Votes | % |
|---|---|---|---|
| Democratic | Mark Herring | 1,105,045 | 49.91 |
| Republican | Mark Obenshain | 1,104,138 | 49.87 |
| Write-in | | 4,892 | 0.22 |
| Total votes | | 2,214,075 | 100.00 |

2017

Herring ran unopposed in the 2017 Democratic primary.

2017 Virginia Attorney General election
| Party | Candidate | Votes | % |
|---|---|---|---|
| Democratic | Mark Herring (incumbent) | 1,385,389 | 53.34 |
| Republican | John Donley Adams | 1,209,339 | 46.56 |
| Write-in | | 2,486 | 0.10 |
| Total votes | | 2,597,214 | 100.00 |

2021

2021 Virginia Attorney General Democratic primary election
| Party | Candidate | Votes | % |
|---|---|---|---|
| Democratic | Mark Herring (incumbent) | 274,736 | 56.63 |
| Democratic | Jay Jones | 210,365 | 43.37 |
| Total votes | | 485,101 | 100.00 |

2021 Virginia Attorney General election
| Party | Candidate | Votes | % |
|---|---|---|---|
| Republican | Jason Miyares | 1,647,100 | 50.36 |
| Democratic | Mark Herring (incumbent) | 1,620,564 | 49.55 |
| Write-in | | 2,995 | 0.09 |
| Total votes | | 3,297,659 | 100.00 |

Senate of Virginia
| Preceded by Bill Mims | Member of the Virginia Senate from the 33rd district 2006–2014 | Succeeded by Jennifer Wexton |
Party political offices
| Preceded by Steve Shannon | Democratic nominee for Attorney General of Virginia; 2013, 2017, 2021 | Succeeded by Jay Jones |
Legal offices
| Preceded by Ken Cuccinelli | Attorney General of Virginia; 2014–2022 | Succeeded by Jason Miyares |
