= Jason Miyares =

American politician (born 1976)

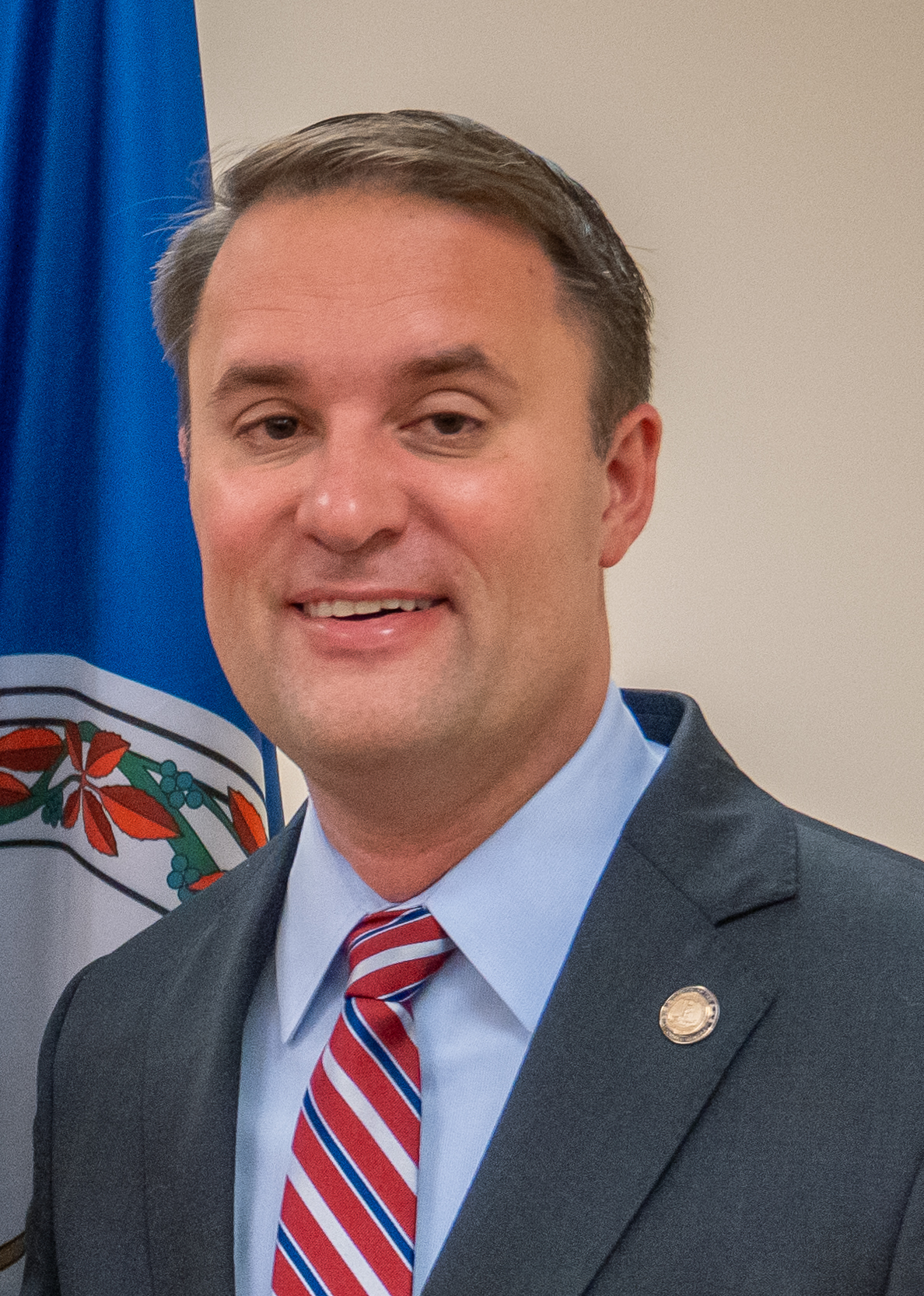
- Miyares in 2025

48th Attorney General of Virginia
- In office January 15, 2022 – January 17, 2026
- Governor: Glenn Youngkin
- Preceded by: Mark Herring
- Succeeded by: Jay Jones

Member of the Virginia House of Delegates from the 82nd district
- In office January 13, 2016 – January 12, 2022
- Preceded by: Bill DeSteph
- Succeeded by: Anne Ferrell Tata

Personal details
- Born: Jason Stuart Miyares; February 11, 1976 (age 50) Greensboro, North Carolina, U.S.
- Party: Republican
- Spouse: Page Atkinson
- Children: 3
- Education: James Madison University (BBA); College of William and Mary (JD)
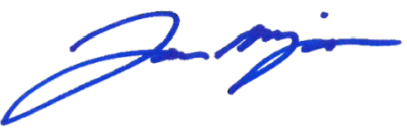
- Signature

Jason Stuart Miyares (born February 11, 1976) is an American politician and attorney who served as the 48th attorney general of Virginia from 2022 to 2026. A member of the Republican Party, he previously served as a member of the Virginia House of Delegates from 2016 to 2022.

Miyares was elected as attorney general in 2021, defeating Democratic incumbent Mark Herring. The son of a Cuban immigrant, Miyares was the first Hispanic American elected statewide in Virginia as well as the first to serve as attorney general in the Commonwealth. He lost reelection to Democrat Jay Jones in 2025. Miyares is currently affiliated with the Torridon Group, a boutique strategic advisory firm founded by former U.S. attorney general William Barr.

== Early life and education ==
Miyares was born on February 11, 1976, in Greensboro, North Carolina. He attended public schools in Virginia Beach. His mother, Miriam Miyares, fled from Cuba in 1965. His brothers are Bryan Redding, a commercial cinematographer and the late Steven Marcus Miyares, a Virginia criminal defense attorney.

Miyares graduated from James Madison University in 1998 with a Bachelor of Business Administration degree and from William & Mary Law School in 2005 with a Juris Doctor degree. He was Chairman of the Hampton Roads Young Republicans and a founding member of the Hampton Roads Federalist Society. He later served as an assistant commonwealth's attorney in Virginia Beach.

== Career ==
Miyares worked on George Allen's 2000 Senate campaign. He was campaign manager and advisor to Republican Scott Rigell in the 2010 and 2012 congressional elections. Miyares worked as a prosecutor in the Virginia Beach Commonwealth's Attorney's Office. He was later a partner with the consulting firm Madison Strategies. He also worked at the Virginia Beach law firm Hanger Law until his election to the office of Attorney General.

=== Virginia House of Delegates ===
In 2015, Miyares ran for the Virginia House of Delegates' seat being vacated by Bill DeSteph, who ran successfully for the Virginia State Senate. Unopposed in the June 2015 Republican primary, he defeated Democrat Bill Fleming in the November 2015 general election. He was the first Cuban American elected to the Virginia General Assembly. He was reelected in 2017 and 2019. He served on three committees: General Laws, Courts of Justice, and Transportation. Miyares also served on the Virginia Board of Veterans Services and as Chairman of the Commission on Equal Opportunity for Virginians in Aspiring and Diverse Communities. Miyares was the 2018 and 2019 "Legislator of the Year" by the College of Affordability and Public Trust and 2018 "Legislator of the Year" by the Hampton Roads Military Officers Association. In 2019, he received the "Action Award" by the Safe House Project.

He endorsed Marco Rubio in the 2016 Republican presidential primaries, and was Rubio's Virginia campaign co-chairman. In 2016, amid the Cuban thaw, Miyares criticized Governor Terry McAuliffe's outreach to Cuba. Miyares introduced a non-binding resolution (H.J. 1777) in 2016 condemning the Boycott, Divestment and Sanctions movement.

In November 2018, an amendment proposal from Miyares was placed into the Constitution of Virginia that allows spouses of veterans with disabilities who have died to receive a full property tax exemption on the home they live in if they choose to relocate. In August 2019, Miyares offered HB 4031, a red flag law bill. Miyares believes his "bill has a balance of due process and constitutional rights while keeping guns out of the hands of those who can be dangerous due to mental health." In October 2019, Miyares said he planned to reintroduce "legislation that would allow the state to work directly with the Army Corps of Engineers on large flooding mitigation projects."

Miyares authored two bills in 2019 that became law: one that allowed public colleges and universities to offer scholarships for students in foster care and another that required public colleges and universities to hold a public comment period at Board of Visitors (BOV) meetings when tuition increases were proposed. In March 2020, Miyares opposed legislation to increase the minimum wage in Virginia. In August 2020, he offered HB 5037, a bill that would grant immunity, except in cases of willful misconduct or gross negligence, to public officials and businesses who followed public health measures to prevent the transmission of COVID-19. In September 2020, Miyares voted against legislation to authorize local governments to remove Confederate monuments on public property.

Miyares opposed the decision to abolish capital punishment in Virginia in February 2021.

== Virginia Attorney General (2022–2026) ==
=== 2021 Virginia Attorney General Election ===
In May 2021, Miyares was nominated as the Republican candidate for Virginia Attorney General. He ran against Mark Herring, the incumbent Democratic attorney general, who sought a third term in the November 2021 general election. Miyares was selected at the Virginia Republican Party's "unassembled" convention, in which party delegates cast ranked-choice ballots at polling sites across the state. Miyares defeated three other candidates: Leslie Haley, Chuck Smith, and Jack White. In the final round, Miyares defeated Smith, a hard-right candidate, by a closer-than-expected margin of 52% to 48%.

During his campaign against Herring, Miyares emphasized crime issues. He opposed proposals for the elimination of qualified immunity and declined to take a position on what he would do in the police killing of Bijan Ghaisar. In the November 2021 election, Miyares defeated Herring in a tight race, becoming the first Hispanic and Cuban American to be elected Attorney General of Virginia.

=== 2025 Virginia Attorney General election ===
Miyares launched his re-election bid on X (formerly Twitter) on November 18, 2024, after the 2024 elections where he pledged to either officially run for attorney general or governor. Before his declination, Miyares was widely viewed as the main potential challenger to Earle-Sears in the Republican primary for the 2025 gubernatorial election. He criticized Earle-Sears for her gubernatorial announcement being before the 2024 Elections.

On April 5, Miyares became the official Republican nominee for attorney general after no other candidates filed to run.

Miyares faced Democratic nominee Jay Jones in the general election after Jones won the Democratic primary on June 17, 2025. Miyares' re-election campaign emphasized crime reduction, prevention of overdose cases, and regulation on social media corporations. Miyares declined to make statements on federal layoffs and tariffs from the Trump Administration which were unpopular in the state — he noted CNBC's position of Virginia "as the top state for business" in 2024. Miyares endorsed Republican John Reid for lieutenant governor in the 2025 Virginia lieutenant gubernatorial election.

In August, the Republican Governors Association supported Miyares as the "party's best hope for a win" and "the strongest Republican on the Virginia ballot in 2025." Earle-Sears' gubernatorial campaign at the top-of-the-ticket was criticized for the inability to competitively raise funds and lack of attention for her campaign. By late summer, many political pundits believed Earle-Sears' improved her campaign, which would enable Miyares to split the ticket and win his re-election. The RGA spent $2 million on Miyares' re-election bid, while Miyares outspent Jones nearly 2-1 ($7.5 million-$4 million). He unexpectedly spent more money than Earle-Sears in the summer, where she only raised $4.5 million.

On October 2, Jay Jones was found speeding on Interstate 64 at 116 miles per hour in New Kent County in 2022 which would result in one year of jail time. His own attorney made Jones do community service: Jones was ordered to pay $1,500 in fines and 1,000 hours of community service. He spent 500 hours of community service on his own PAC which saw criticism from Miyares. On October 3, the National Review released Jones' text messages where he joked about the gun death of former Speaker of the House Todd Gilbert and his family. Former chief of staff to Miyares, DJ Jordan said, "This could be an October surprise that has some sway." Miyares — with his fundraising advantage — was backed with $3.5 million in ad buys which attacked Jones' text messages. Before the texts, Miyares moderately lagged behind Jay Jones. In the October Washington Post/Schar School poll, Jones lead by six points. On October 16, Virginia State University hosted one debate between Miyares and Jones. When Jones referenced President Trump, Miyares said, "There he goes again" while Miyares also touted his tough-on-crime positions, Jones' text messages, and anti-transgender positions. By the end of the campaign, Miyares held the lead in most of the polls. Miyares outspent Jones $27 million to $16 million with significant independent expenditures in favor of Miyares.

While Miyares won 46.45% of the vote, Jones defeated Miyares by 6.69% which was considered an unexpectedly large margin for Jones after his text messages. Despite Miyares' loss, he was the best performing Republican of the 2025 Republican ticket for Virginia's three statewide executive offices.

=== Tenure ===
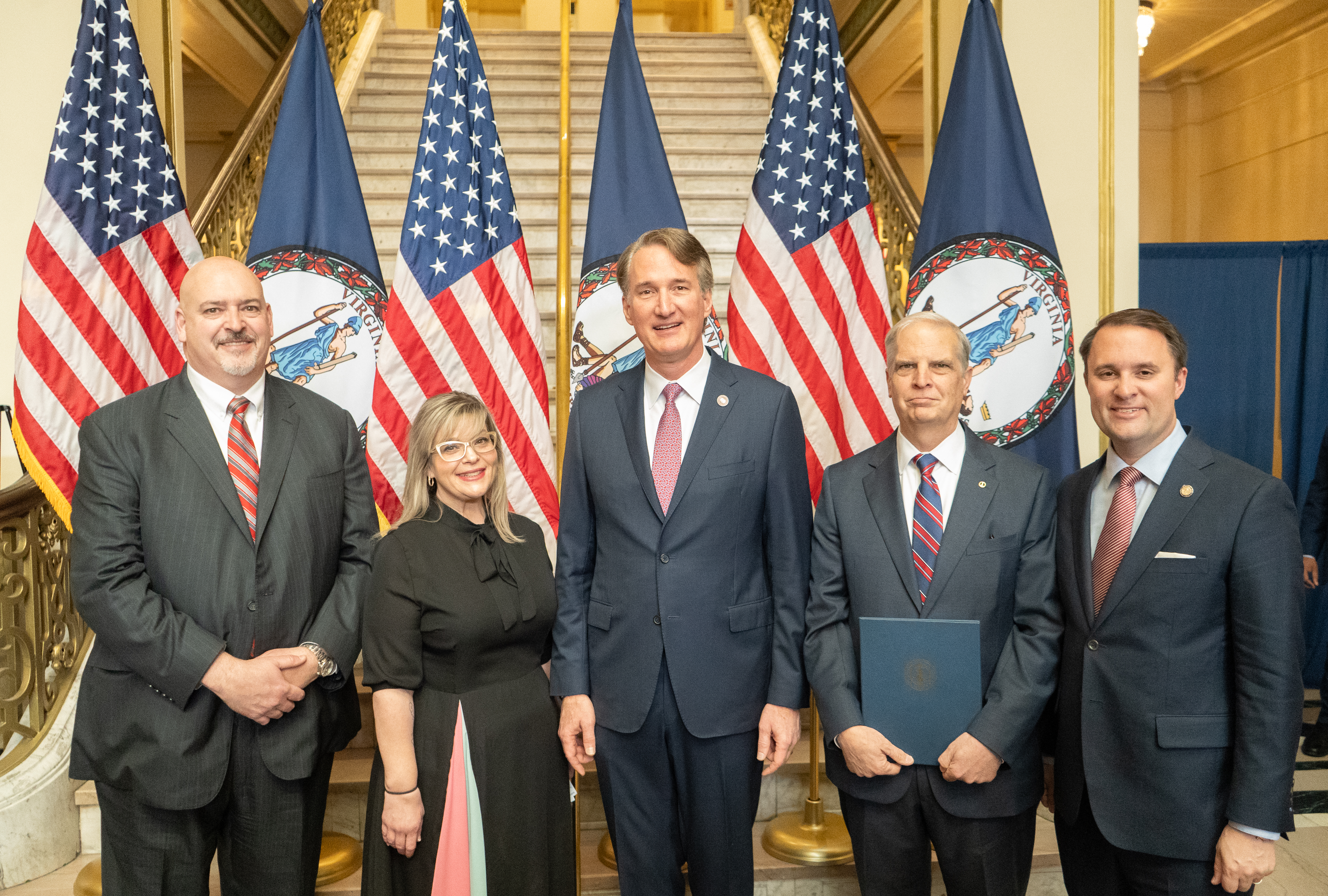
Miyares with Governor Glenn Youngkin and other Republican politicians.

==== Abortion ====
In January 2022, Miyares withdrew the Virginia AG Office's brief to the Supreme Court, submitted under his predecessor, supporting a challenge to Mississippi's abortion ban of restricting abortion to 15 weeks.

In May 2023, Miyares defended his decision to not join with 22 other Republican state attorneys general when they filed a lawsuit seeking to ban the abortion medication mifepristone, saying he supported the Food and Drug Administration's regulations.

Miyares supports a 15-week ban on abortion with exceptions for rape, incest and the life of the mother. He has stated that he opposes prosecuting people for seeking abortions.

==== COVID-19 ====
In January 2022, Miyares issued a non-binding advisory opinion stating that public colleges and universities in Virginia lack the authority to require students to receive the COVID-19 vaccine before enrolling in-person classes. Following the opinion, at least two institutions (George Mason University and Virginia Tech) dropped their vaccine requirement.

==== Education ====
In January 2025, Miyares announced a settlement with several states and the National Collegiate Athletic Association (NCAA) that protects a student's name, image, and likeness (NIL) during the recruiting process and permanently bars the NCAA from reinstating its NIL recruiting ban.

In December 2025, Miyares filed a suit against a state law that granted in-state tuition for undocumented students who graduated from Virginia high schools.

==== Elections ====
On February 10, 2022, Miyares' deputy attorney general for government operations and transactions resigned when it was reported that she had spread misinformation about the 2020 election and praised the 2021 United States Capitol attack; in her position, she would have overseen matters related to future elections in Virginia. Miyares himself has affirmed that Joe Biden was legitimately elected president and has condemned the attack on the United States Capitol.

On October 10, 2023, Miyares sent a cease-and-desist letter to a right-wing advocacy group over their misinformation pertaining to the 2023 Virginia elections. On December 29, 2023, Miyares won a case against an organization involved in distributing "false and misleading" fliers stating that "if voters did not cast their ballots they could lose their Social Security income, Medicare eligibility, unemployment benefits, child tax credits, child custody rights, and concealed carry permits" in Virginia.

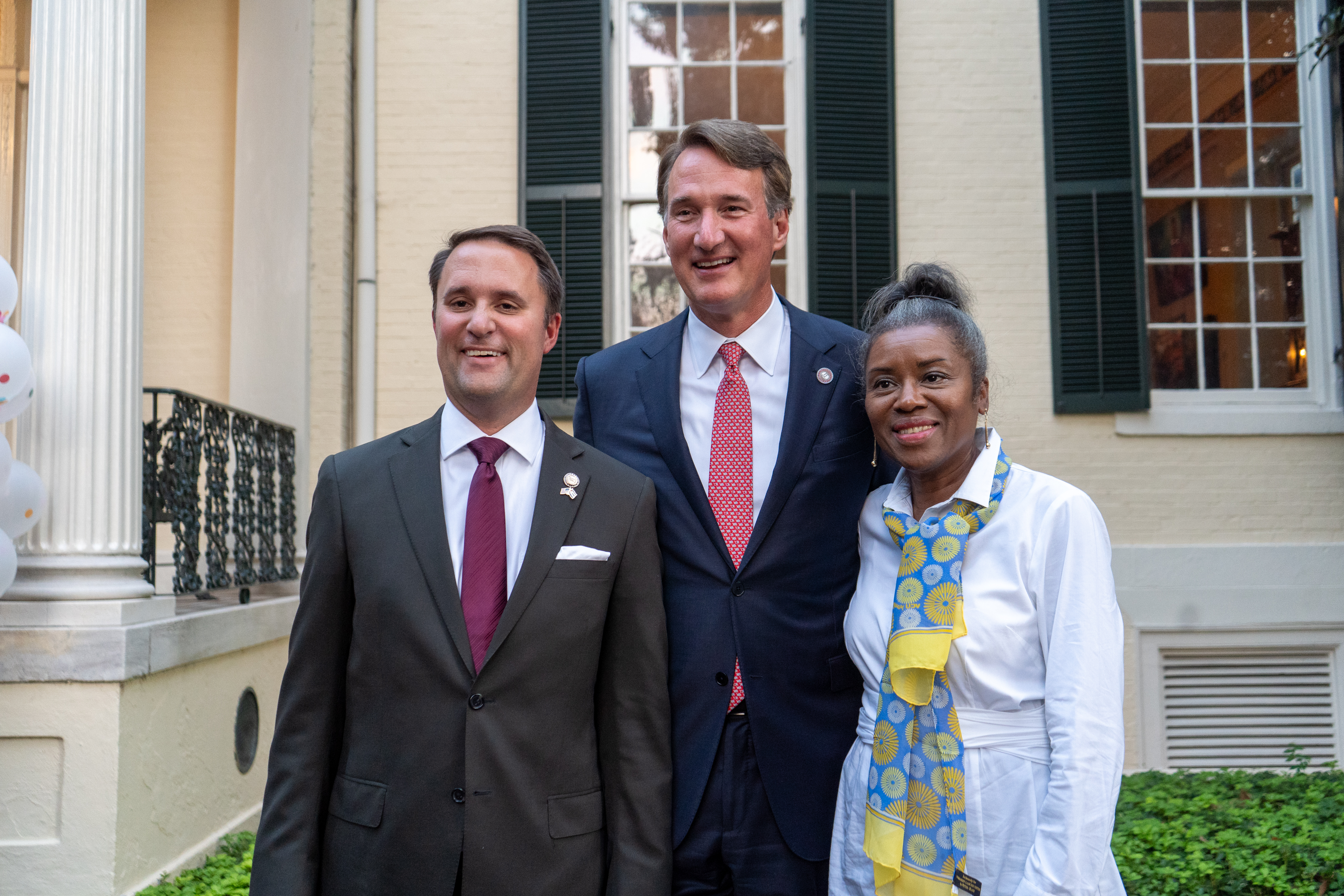
Miyares with Governor Glenn Youngkin and Lieutenant Governor Winsome Earle-Sears at the Executive Mansion in 2023

==== Electric vehicles ====
In June 2024, Miyares issued an opinion that allowed Virginia to withdraw from California's zero-emissions regulations at the beginning of 2025. When the opinion was issued, Virginia followed California law on vehicle emission standards instead of the federal standards after the Virginia legislature enacted it in 2021. The California standards force automotive manufacturers to sell at least 35% of their new vehicles as all-electric in 2026 before entirely eliminating the sale of new internal combustion engine (including hybrid) vehicles by 2035. Federal standards state that 70% of new vehicles sold will be either all-electric or hybrid internal combustion engine powered by 2035; in 2024, an estimated 6.5% of new vehicles sold in the United States were zero-emissions.

==== Elder abuse ====
In June 2024, Miyares launched an elder abuse investigation center for the Greater Richmond Region after an increase in cases were seen. The center is administered by the Virginia Attorney General's Office and seeks to "streamline collaboration between law enforcement, connect investigators with medical or financial experts who can better solve complex cases, and provide localities with other resources."

==== Environment ====
On September 13, 2023, Miyares announced an $80 million settlement with Monsanto to ameliorate "the environmental contamination in the Commonwealth, which was caused by Monsanto's distribution of polychlorinated biphenyls (PCBs)." According to the settlement, the "funds will be directed toward restitution and remediation efforts... environmental studies, stream restoration projects, improvements to drinking water and wastewater systems, fisheries management, and land remediation efforts."

==== Gun violence ====
In 2022, Miyares started a targeted violence intervention initiative, Operation Ceasefire, to crack down on gun violence through "rigorous prosecution and community prevention" in 13 cities. One year after the initiative was started, overall crime dropped in 12 of the 13 cities and violent crime dropped in 9 of the 13 cities, with cities reporting 225 fewer crimes than the previous year.

==== Housing ====
On March 20, 2025, Miyares secured the largest fair housing jury award in Virginia's history after a jury in Franklin County "awarded $750,000 in damages to two families who were evicted from a Smith Mountain Lake campground after the owner learned one of the family members was Black." On October 2, 2025, Miyares filed an anti-trust lawsuit against Zillow for their $100 million acquisition of Redfin's multifamily rental listing service. Miyares argued that Zillow's acquisition harms Virginia renters searching for available apartments since it decreases the quality of search results.

==== LGBTQ rights ====
In January 2025, Miyares ordered VCU and UVA Health to stop providing gender affirming care to patients under the age of 19, citing Executive Order 14187. In June 2025, Miyares entered into a consent decree to not enforce a ban on talk conversion therapy enacted in 2020.

==== Opioids ====
On April 16, 2024, Miyares announced a $108 million settlement from seven drug manufacturers and retailers for illegally pushing opioids. Miyares praised his Consumer Protection team for negotiating the settlement with Virginia receiving over $1.1 billion in total opioid payouts under his team.

==== Policing ====
On September 7, 2023, Miyares reached a settlement with the Town of Windsor, in Isle of Wight County, over its alleged "discriminatory, unconstitutional policing" conduct. Per the settlement, Windsor will have to "submit to an independent third-party review system for use-of-force complaints and other complaints of serious misconduct alleged against any officer." The town police department will also have to "obtain accreditation from the Virginia Law Enforcement Professional Standards Commission, raising the bar on its internal investigation processes and officer training."

==== Retail theft ====
In 2022, Miyares was directed by the Virginia General Assembly to study retail theft. A report commissioned by Miyares found that $1.3 billion of retail goods were being stolen annually in Virginia, resulting in $80 million less in state sales tax revenue per annum. The report led to Virginia passing a law in 2023 to raise the penalties for organized retail theft, defined as "steal[ing] retail merchandise with a value exceeding $5,000 in a 90-day period, with the intent to sell the stolen goods for profit", from a misdemeanor to a felony.

==== Staffing ====
Upon taking office in January 2022, Miyares fired 17 attorneys, and 13 other employees, in the Virginia AG's Office and the counsels for George Mason University (GMU) and the University of Virginia. After the firings, Miyares hired former Commonwealth's Attorney for Arlington County Theo Stamos to lead the conviction integrity unit.

==== Ticket holders ====
In June 2024, Miyares announced a $1.3 million settlement, including a $600,000 fine, from the Washington Commanders over their prior "unlawful retain[ment] of security deposits" for season ticket holders.

==== Tolls ====
In January 2024, Miyares issued a statement opposing proposed increased tolls on the privately owned Dulles Greenway. The proposal would increase tolls from $5.25 to $6.40 for one way trips during regular hours and $5.80 to $8.10 for one way trips during peak hours with Miyares calling the proposed hikes an "unreasonable financial burden" for commuters.

==== Veterans ====
In March 2025, Miyares led an effort to sue the Department of Veterans Affairs (VA) over its handling of education benefits for two veterans. The suit had all 50 state attorneys general sign on to it.

== Post-attorney general ==
In May 2026, Miyares joined Advancing American Freedom, a think tank founded by former vice president Mike Pence. In August 2026, conservative think tank Freedom Foundation hired Miyares.

== Electoral history ==
| Date | Election | Candidate | Party | Votes | % |
Virginia House of Delegates, 82nd district
| November 3, 2015 | General | Jason S. Miyares | Republican | 10,046 | 65.19 |
| November 3, 2015 | General | William W. Fleming | Democratic | 5,335 | 34.62 |
| November 3, 2015 | General | Write-ins | | 29 | 0.19 |
| November 3, 2015 | General | Bill DeSteph ran for Senate; seat stayed Republican | | | |

| Date | Election | Candidate | Party | Votes | % |
Virginia Attorney General
| November 2, 2021 | General | Jason Miyares | Republican | 1,647,100 | 50.36 |
| November 2, 2021 | General | Mark Herring | Democratic | 1,620,564 | 49.55 |
| November 2, 2021 | General | Write-ins | | 2,995 | 0.09 |
| November 2, 2021 | General | Republican won Democratic-held seat | | | |

| Date | Election | Candidate | Party | Votes | % |
Virginia Attorney General
| November 4, 2025 | General | Jay Jones | Democratic | 1,804,940 | 53.14 |
| November 4, 2025 | General | Jason Miyares | Republican | 1,577,843 | 46.45 |
| November 4, 2025 | General | Write-ins | | 13,716 | 0.40 |
| November 4, 2025 | General | Democrat won Republican-held seat | | | |

== Personal life ==
Miyares and his wife, Page (née Atkinson) Miyares, have three daughters and live in Virginia Beach, Virginia. His father-in-law, John Atkinson, was formerly treasurer of Virginia Beach. Miyares is a member of the Galilee Episcopal Church and a past President of the Cape Henry Rotary, where he was a Paul Harris Fellow.

Party political offices
| Preceded by John Adams | Republican nominee for Attorney General of Virginia; 2021, 2025 | Most recent |
Legal offices
| Preceded by Mark Herring | Attorney General of Virginia; 2022–2026 | Succeeded by Jay Jones |
