= Justin Fairfax =

American politician (1979–2026)

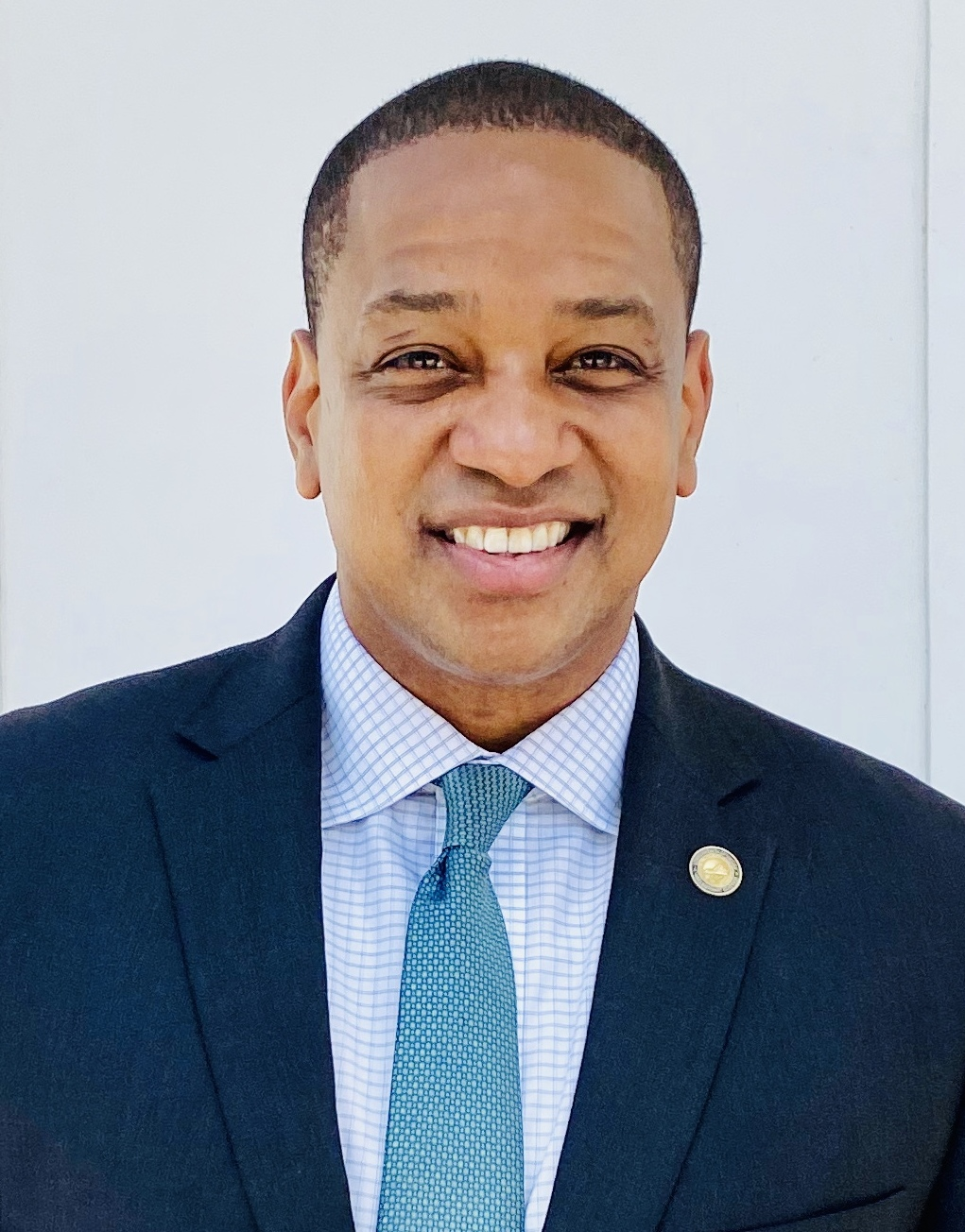
- Fairfax in 2020

41st Lieutenant Governor of Virginia
- In office January 13, 2018 – January 15, 2022
- Governor: Ralph Northam
- Preceded by: Ralph Northam
- Succeeded by: Winsome Earle-Sears

Personal details
- Born: Justin Edward Fairfax; February 17, 1979 Pittsburgh, Pennsylvania, U.S.
- Died: April 16, 2026 (aged 47) Woodburn, Fairfax County, Virginia, U.S.
- Cause of death: Suicide by firearm
- Party: Democratic
- Spouse: Cerina Wanzer (m. 2006; sep. 2025)
- Children: 2
- Relatives: Roger Fairfax (brother)
- Education: Duke University (BA); Columbia University (JD)

Justin Edward Fairfax (February 17, 1979 – April 16, 2026) was an American lawyer and politician who served as the 41st lieutenant governor of Virginia from 2018 to 2022. A member of the Democratic Party, he was the second African American to be elected to statewide office in Virginia, after Douglas Wilder. In 2019, he faced sexual assault allegations dating to 2000 and 2004, resulting in his departure from his law firm and calls for his resignation as lieutenant governor. He served out the remainder of his term.

Fairfax was a Democratic candidate for governor of Virginia in the 2021 election. He finished fourth in the Democratic primary with 3.54% of the vote. On the morning of April 16, 2026, Fairfax fatally shot his wife, Cerina Fairfax, before killing himself in a murder–suicide.

== Early life and career ==
Justin Edward Fairfax was born on February 17, 1979, in Pittsburgh, Pennsylvania. He moved with his family from Pittsburgh to Northeast Washington, D.C., when he was five years old. One of four children, Fairfax graduated from DeMatha Catholic High School in Hyattsville, Maryland, where he was senior class president.

Fairfax graduated from Duke University in 2000, with a degree in public policy. After serving on the staff of the U.S. Senate Judiciary Committee for two years, Fairfax attended Columbia Law School, where he graduated with a Juris Doctor in 2005 and was a member of the Columbia Law Review.

Fairfax's ancestors were enslaved by the Lords Fairfax of Cameron, for whom Fairfax County, Virginia, is named. His ancestor, Simon Fairfax, was freed by Thomas Fairfax, 9th Lord Fairfax of Cameron, who manumitted his slaves as part of his Swedenborgian beliefs. Justin Fairfax was presented with a copy of the manumission document by his father on the day he was sworn in as Virginia's lieutenant governor in 2018. Fairfax's eldest brother, Roger Jr., is a legal scholar and Dean of Howard University Law School.

== Career ==
Fairfax was a briefing coordinator for Tipper Gore during the 2000 presidential campaign of Al Gore, in the campaign's Nashville, Tennessee, office. He was also a staffer for Democratic senator John Edwards of North Carolina, in his Washington office.

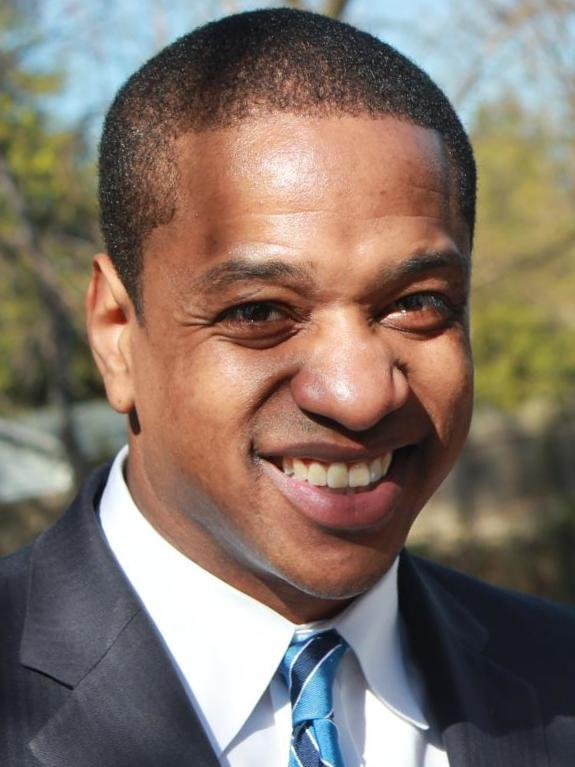
Fairfax during his 2013 attorney general campaign

Over the summer of 2004, he joined the John Kerry presidential campaign, as a body man for Edwards, then the vice presidential candidate.

He then served as law clerk to Judge Gerald Bruce Lee of the U.S. District Court for the Eastern District of Virginia in 2005. He worked in the Washington office of the law firm WilmerHale before joining the U.S. Attorney's Office for the Eastern District of Virginia in 2010. Fairfax worked for two years as a federal prosecutor in Alexandria, Virginia. He served as deputy coordinator of the Northern Virginia Human Trafficking Task Force during this time.

Fairfax ran for public office for the first time in 2013, seeking the Democratic nomination for state attorney general. He lost to Mark Herring, but surprised party insiders with his strong performance in the primary. Herring defeated Fairfax by about 4,500 votes out of 141,600 cast in a closer-than-expected race. The Washington Post's editorial board praised both candidates during the primary, but endorsed Fairfax, writing that he had displayed "an agile and impressive command of the issues with a prosecutor's passion for justice."

After the race, Fairfax co-chaired the 2014 reelection campaign of U.S. Senator Mark Warner from Virginia. The following year, he was recruited to work at the law firm of Venable LLP, in the firm's Tysons, Virginia, office. Fairfax then worked for Morrison & Foerster, a law firm where he made partner in September 2018. In July 2019, following sexual assault allegations against him, Fairfax announced that he was resigning from Morrison & Foerster, which had accepted his resignation.

Fairfax was a visitor at Duke University's Sanford School of Public Policy from 2008 to 2014 and again beginning in 2015. On February 8, 2019, the school's dean, Judith Kelley, asked Fairfax to step down while pending the resolution of the allegations.

== Lieutenant Governor of Virginia ==
=== Campaign ===
In 2017, Fairfax ran for Lieutenant Governor of Virginia. In the Democratic primaries, he faced Gene Rossi, a federal prosecutor, who had trained Fairfax when they worked together in Alexandria's Eastern District federal court, and Susan Platt, a political lobbyist and consultant, who had served as chief of staff to Joe Biden in the 1990s. Platt had also run Virginia Senator Chuck Robb's 1994 re-election campaign and Don Beyer's unsuccessful 1997 gubernatorial campaign.

Citing their unease with Dominion Energy's planned construction of the Atlantic Coast Pipeline, all three candidates in the Democratic primary pledged to refuse campaign contributions from Dominion Energy, despite the company being the largest contributor to Virginia political campaigns for both Republicans and Democrats. Although early polling showed Platt in the lead, Fairfax significantly outraised both of his opponents and proved victorious in the primary election, carrying about 49% of the vote.

Fairfax then faced Republican nominee Jill Vogel, a state senator from Fauquier County, in the general election. Fairfax and Vogel raised comparable amounts of money for their campaigns—$3.9 million and $3.7 million, respectively. A forum between Fairfax and Vogel was held at Piedmont Virginia Community College on August 9, 2017 and a debate between the two candidates was held at the University of Richmond on October 5.

Noting that Fairfax had been largely unknown when he ran for attorney general four years earlier, The Washington Post wrote that Fairfax had transitioned from "party crasher" to "party insider" in the time since, having "methodically done the work necessary to raise his profile and pay dues." The Washington Post went on to endorse Fairfax in the race, calling him "bright, competent, well-versed" and "the much better choice".

Fairfax's opposition to the Atlantic Coast and Mountain Valley pipelines led to him being omitted from a small number of campaign flyers that were distributed by the campaign for Democratic gubernatorial nominee Ralph Northam. These flyers were released at the request of Laborers' International Union of North America (LIUNA), which supports the pipeline – LIUNA had endorsed Northam (and Northam's running mate for attorney general, Mark Herring, who was included on the flyer), but not Fairfax. As Fairfax was black, while Northam and Herring are both white, some activists criticized the Northam campaign's decision to accommodate LIUNA's request.

Fairfax responded to the controversy by saying, "This should not have happened, and it should not happen again, and there needs to be robust investment in making sure that we are communicating with African American voters and we are engaging our base." The Fairfax campaign later remarked that the Democratic ticket was "working well together", adding "One piece of literature does not change that." All houses that received the LIUNA flyers also received standard campaign flyers including Fairfax.

In the final days of the campaign, former Virginia governor Douglas Wilder weighed in on the flyer controversy, saying that Fairfax had not "been dealt a good hand". Wilder endorsed Fairfax, but never endorsed Northam. As the election drew to a close, Fairfax and Vogel aired attack ads against each other.

Fairfax won the election by 5.5%. He became only the second African-American in Virginia history to be elected to statewide office (the first being Douglas Wilder, who served as governor, as well as lieutenant governor).

=== Tenure ===
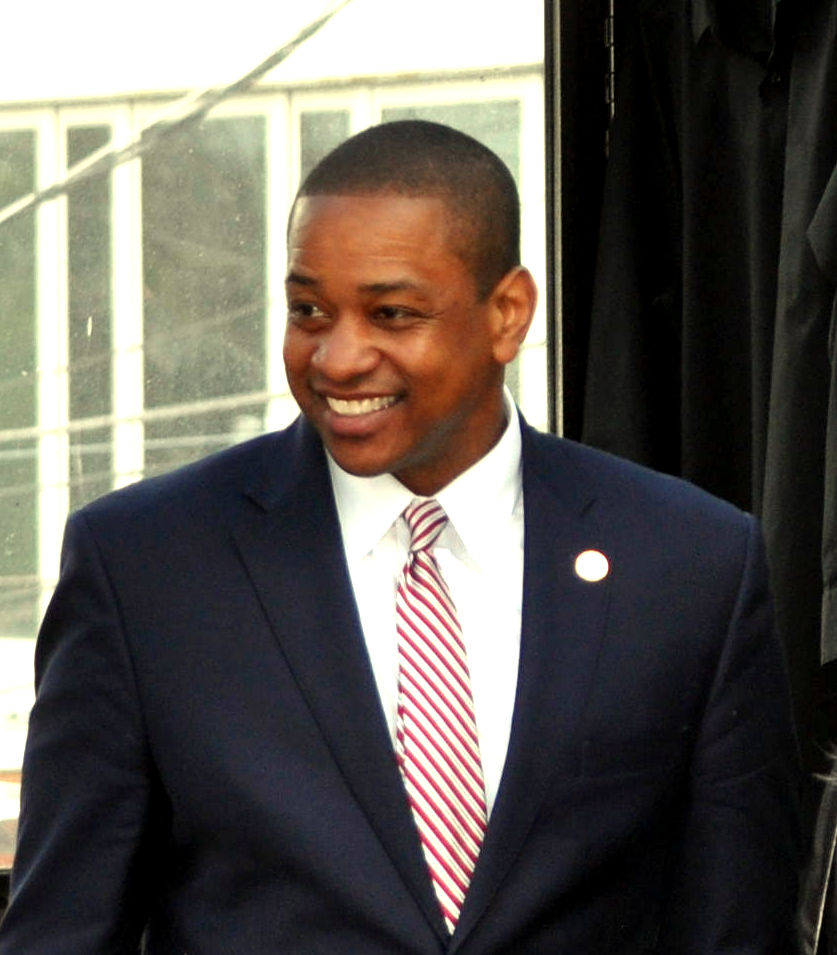
Fairfax in 2018

During his time in office, Fairfax's role as the lieutenant governor of Virginia was part-time. Fairfax announced in December 2017 that he was leaving his law firm, Venable. His law partner at Venable, Larry Roberts, served as his campaign chairman during the election and later served as his chief of staff. In September 2018, Fairfax joined the law firm of Morrison & Foerster, continuing the historic practice of Virginia lieutenant governors maintaining employment while in office. Fairfax became the first head of the Democratic Lieutenant Governors Association (DLGA), which was launched in August 2018.

On January 19, 2019, Fairfax protested a tribute in the state Senate honoring Confederate General Robert E. Lee's birthday. "History repeats itself," Fairfax tweeted. "I will be stepping off the dais today in protest of the Virginia Senate honoring Robert E. Lee...I'll be thinking of this June 5, 1798, manumission document that freed my great-great-great grandfather Simon Fairfax from slavery in Virginia. #WeRiseTogether."

=== Sexual assault allegations ===
In early February 2019, Big League Politics reported that Fairfax had been accused by Vanessa C. Tyson, an associate professor at Scripps College and fellow at Stanford University, of sexual assault at a hotel at the 2004 Democratic National Convention in Boston. Tyson said she had suppressed memories of the event but began telling close friends about it when she saw pictures of Fairfax running for lieutenant governor in 2017.

Tyson first approached The Washington Post with her allegation after Fairfax won election in November 2017, but the Post said that it decided not to run the story because it could not corroborate the story or find similar incidents in Fairfax's past. Tyson also approached a friend, Virginia Congressman Bobby Scott, with the allegation around the same time, but Scott declined to act on it. According to The New York Times, at least six friends of Tyson reported that she told them about the alleged assault between 2017 and 2018 but she had no real time corroboration from 2004.

Fairfax denied the accusation, saying his encounter with Tyson was consensual and the timing of the reports was intended to smear him; beginning February 1, after the discovery of a racist photo on Ralph Northam's medical school yearbook, there had been widespread calls for Northam to resign and let Fairfax become Governor of Virginia. Fairfax also insinuated that supporters of Northam, or someone connected with Richmond mayor Levar Stoney, a potential political rival since both were speculated as possible Democratic candidates for governor in 2021, may have been behind the allegation going public.

Tyson released a statement detailing her allegations, saying the encounter started as consensual kissing but ended with Fairfax forcing her to perform oral sex on him. Tyson said she is a Democrat with no political agenda and felt compelled to release the statement because Fairfax "has tried to brand me as a liar to a national audience, in service to his political ambitions, and has threatened litigation." In response, Fairfax issued a statement saying, "I wish her no harm or humiliation, nor do I seek to denigrate her or diminish her voice. But I cannot agree with a description of events that I know is not true."

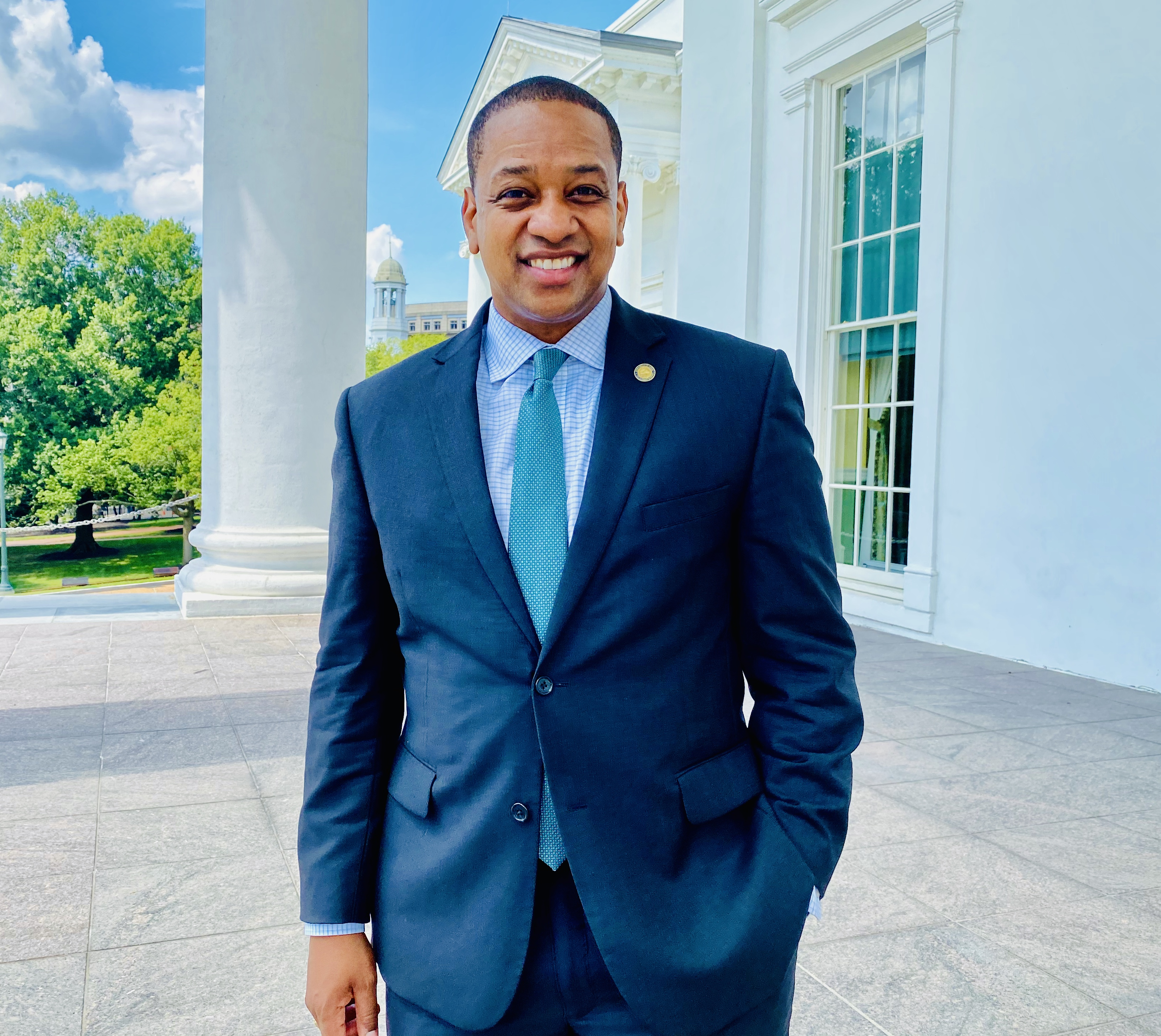
Fairfax in 2020

NBC News reported that Fairfax used a misogynistic obscenity to describe Tyson in a private staff meeting after the allegation came out, according to two sources in the meeting. Fairfax's chief of staff and policy director conceded that he did use profanity but denied it was towards his accuser and Fairfax demanded NBC and its reporters retract their reporting. After the story broke, Fairfax hired the same legal team that represented Brett Kavanaugh during his confirmation process, while Tyson hired the same legal team that represented Kavanaugh's accuser Christine Blasey Ford. Virginia Congresswoman Jennifer Wexton tweeted her support for Tyson.

On February 8, 2019, a second woman, Meredith Watson, came forward with sexual assault allegations against Fairfax, alleging that he raped her in a "premeditated and aggressive" attack in 2000 when both were undergraduate students at Duke University. A college friend of Watson stated she remembered Watson telling her about the assault the day after it happened. Watson said she had been previously raped by a Duke basketball player, later identified as Corey Maggette, and brought the matter to the dean but was discouraged from pursuing the matter.

Watson's attorney said that Watson had one interaction with Fairfax after the alleged assault outside a campus party, during which Watson said "Why did you do it?" and reported Fairfax replied, "I knew that because of what happened to you last year, you'd be too afraid to say anything." Watson's attorney said this showed Fairfax "used the prior rape of his 'friend' against her when he chose to rape her in a premeditated way". Fairfax denied the second accusation, issuing a statement saying,

I deny this latest unsubstantiated allegation. It is demonstrably false. I have never forced myself on anyone ever. I demand a full investigation into these unsubstantiated and false allegations. Such an investigation will confirm my account because I am telling the truth. I will clear my good name and I have nothing to hide. I have passed two full, field background checks by the FBI and run for office in two highly contested elections with nothing like this being raised before. It is obvious that a vicious and coordinated smear campaign is being orchestrated against me. I will not resign.

The second allegation caused a wave of calls for Fairfax to resign from politicians including many Democrats in the General Assembly; most of Virginia's Democratic members of Congress, including Tim Kaine; former governor Terry McAuliffe; and multiple nationally prominent Democrats, including several running for president in 2020. Delegate Patrick Hope, also a Democrat, announced that he would introduce articles of impeachment against Fairfax within three days if Fairfax had not resigned. The Virginia legislature's Black Caucus asked Fairfax to resign.

Hope backed off his plan to introduce articles of impeachment after fellow House Democrats said they were not prepared for the process, saying "additional conversations" were needed. Tyson's lawyer reached out to the Suffolk County, Massachusetts district attorney to schedule a meeting to detail her allegations, while a spokesman for Fairfax said he would be willing to cooperate with any probe and to "explore all options with regard to filing his own criminal complaint in response to the filing of a false criminal complaint against him."

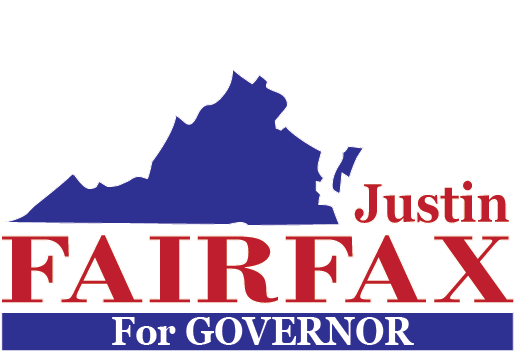
Fairfax's 2021 gubernatorial campaign

After the allegations became public, Fairfax was placed on leave from his law firm, asked to step down from the board of visitors at Duke University's Sanford School of Public Policy, and left his post as chairman of the Democratic Lieutenant Governors Association. Four of his staffers (two from his state office and two from his political action committee) quit in the wake of the allegations, though Fairfax himself remained in office until the end of his term.

=== 2021 gubernatorial campaign ===
In 2021, Fairfax was a Democratic candidate for Governor of Virginia. His campaign was endorsed by Nicholas Fairfax (no relation), a member of the House of Lords of the United Kingdom. During his gubernatorial campaign, Fairfax was criticized for his response to the sexual assault allegations. During a Democratic primary debate, Fairfax compared scrutiny of his sexual assault allegations to that of the cases of George Floyd and Emmett Till in the debate. Following the debate, Fairfax was criticized for the comparison and then-incumbent Governor Ralph Northam announced that he would endorse former Governor Terry McAuliffe over Fairfax.

In the weeks leading up to the Democratic primary, Fairfax polled in the single digits, trailing McAuliffe. Prior to the April debate, Fairfax was polling at 12% against McAuliffe's 26%. He finished fourth in the Democratic primary with 3.54% of the vote, losing to McAuliffe.

== Policy positions ==
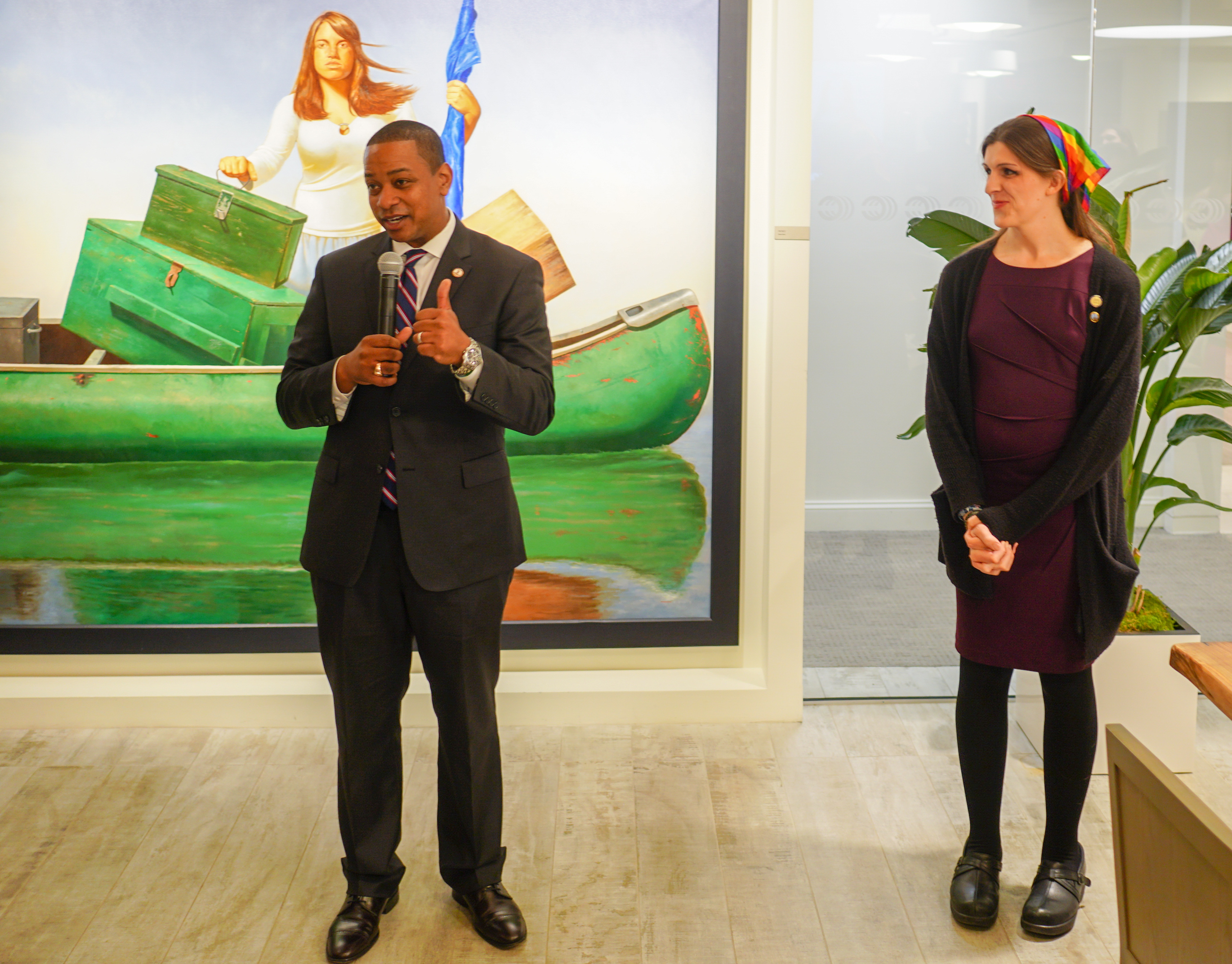
Fairfax speaking at a reception for Danica Roem in Washington, D.C., 2018

On economic issues, Fairfax supported policies such as a $15 minimum wage, action on student loan debt, and more job training and apprenticeships for skilled trades such as electrician, welder, and machine operator. Fairfax supported investment in transportation and infrastructure, and implementation of Governor Terry McAuliffe's Virginia Clean Power Plan to reduce greenhouse gas emissions in order to combat climate change. Fairfax favored promotion of renewable energy such as wind and solar.

Fairfax supported the Affordable Care Act and an expansion of Medicaid to low-income Virginians. He supported caps on campaign contributions. Fairfax had expressed support for single-payer healthcare.

On social issues, Fairfax supported abortion rights and same-sex marriage. He was supportive of gun control measures such as universal background checks, a ban on high-capacity magazines, and an assault weapons ban. He supported criminal justice reform and supported former governor McAuliffe's restoration of voting rights to felons who have completed probation and parole terms. Fairfax favored additional action to combat the opioid crisis and supported the decriminalization of the possession of limited amounts of marijuana for personal use.

== Personal life ==
Fairfax lived in Woodburn, Fairfax County, Virginia, with his wife, Cerina Fairfax, and their two children: a son and daughter. He was Catholic. His wife was a dentist who ran a practice in Fairfax, Virginia.

=== Legal issues ===
Documents obtained by People following his death confirmed that Justin Fairfax and his wife had separated in 2024. Cerina Fairfax filed for divorce on July 18, 2025. They were in the process of divorcing at the time of their deaths. Amid a period of marital strife, Justin Fairfax accused Cerina of assault in early 2026, but interior security cameras she had previously installed revealed that no assault took place. Cerina Fairfax accused Justin of being an alcoholic and not contributing to his share of the expenses such as child support, private school tuition, and their mortgage. Justin Fairfax was scheduled to appear in court on April 21, 2026.

Though they were still living together during their separation and divorce planning, court documents obtained by News 4, a Washington, D.C., television station, revealed that Justin Fairfax had been ordered to move out of their home by the end of April 2026, with a judge also ordering him to be fined $300 for each day he continued not to comply with orders and compensate Cerina for money he owed her. Fairfax lost custody of their children.

== Murder–suicide ==
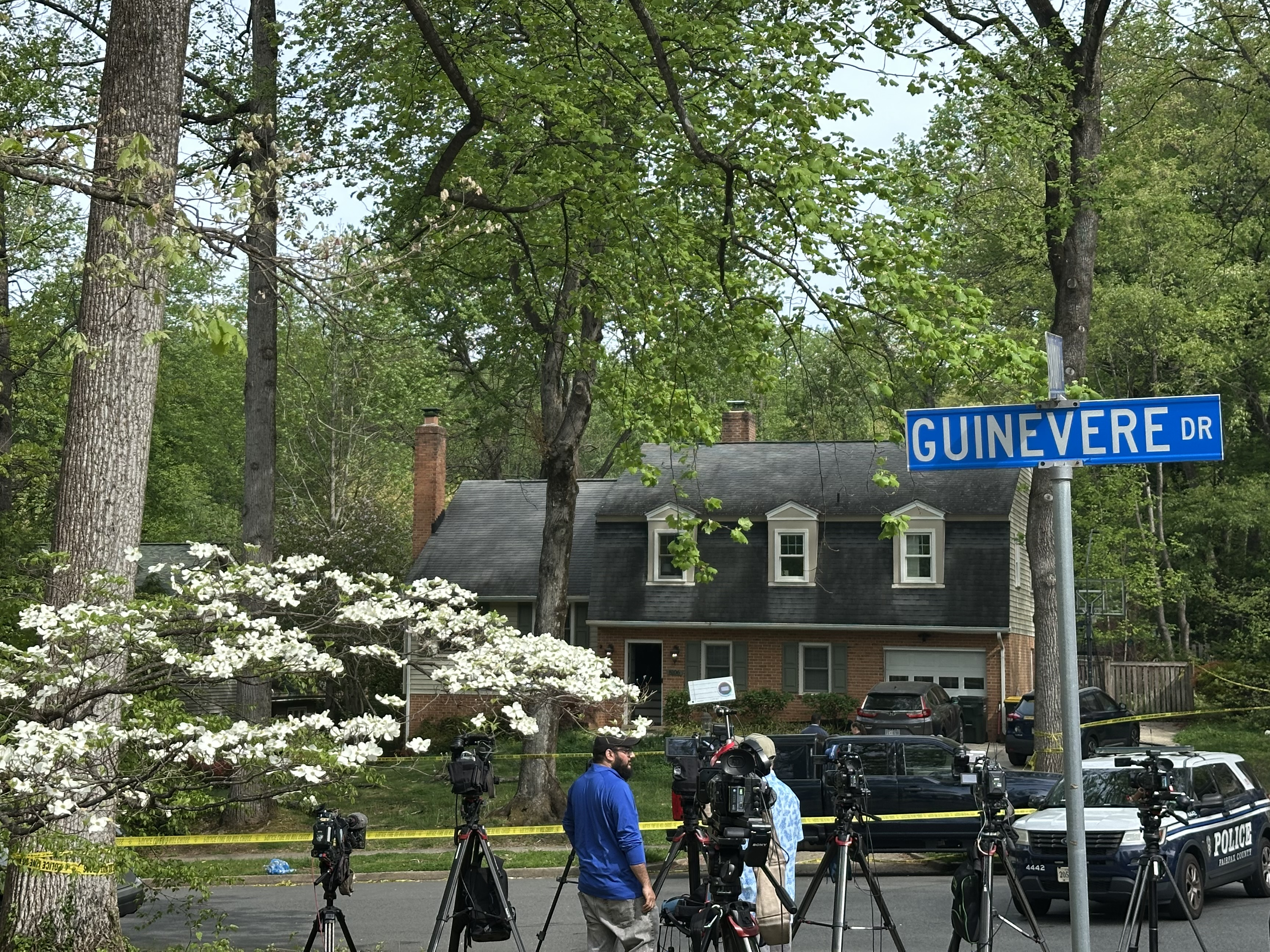
Reporters and police at Fairfax's home on the morning of April 16, 2026, after his murder–suicide

On April 16, 2026, Fairfax was found dead with his wife Cerina in an apparent murder–suicide committed by him at their home. The two were separated and in the process of divorcing but were living together at the time. A judge had ordered him to leave the house by the end of the month. He fatally shot his wife multiple times before shooting himself in the head. The pair's teenage children were home at the time, and their son called 911 following the shooting.

Many Virginia leaders expressed shock at the murder–suicide, including Governor Abigail Spanberger, Lieutenant Governor Ghazala Hashmi, Attorney General Jay Jones, former governor Ralph Northam, and former attorney general Jason Miyares. Michael Blake, a candidate for a congressional seat in New York, posted a message online that portrayed Fairfax sympathetically, which he then deleted after receiving widespread backlash. Following an order from Spanberger, Virginian government offices flew their flags at half staff on May 4, 2026, to memorialize Cerina Fairfax and other victims of domestic violence.

== Electoral history ==
2013 Virginia Attorney General Democratic primary
Party	Candidate	Votes	%
Democratic	Mark Herring	73,069	51.6
Democratic	Justin E. Fairfax	68,542	48.4

2017 Virginia lieutenant gubernatorial Democratic primary
Party	Candidate	Votes	%
Democratic	Justin E. Fairfax	252,226	49.22
Democratic	Susan S. Platt	200,618	39.15
Democratic	Gene J. Rossi	59,616	11.63

2017 Virginia lieutenant gubernatorial election
Party	Candidate	Votes	%
Democratic	Justin E. Fairfax	1,368,261	52.72
Republican	Jill Vogel	1,224,519	47.18
Write-ins	Write-ins	2,446	0.09

2021 Virginia gubernatorial Democratic primary
Party	Candidate	Votes	%
Democratic	Terry McAuliffe	306,234	62.12%
Democratic	Jennifer Carroll Foy	97,749	19.83%
Democratic	Jennifer McClellan	57,848	11.73%
Democratic	Justin E. Fairfax	17,471	3.54%
Democratic	Lee J. Carter	13,662	2.77%
Total votes		492,964	100.00%

== See also ==
- List of minority governors and lieutenant governors in the United States

Political offices
Preceded by Ralph Northam	Lieutenant Governor of Virginia; 2018–2022	Succeeded by Winsome Sears
