= 2013 Virginia Attorney General election =

- November 5, 2013
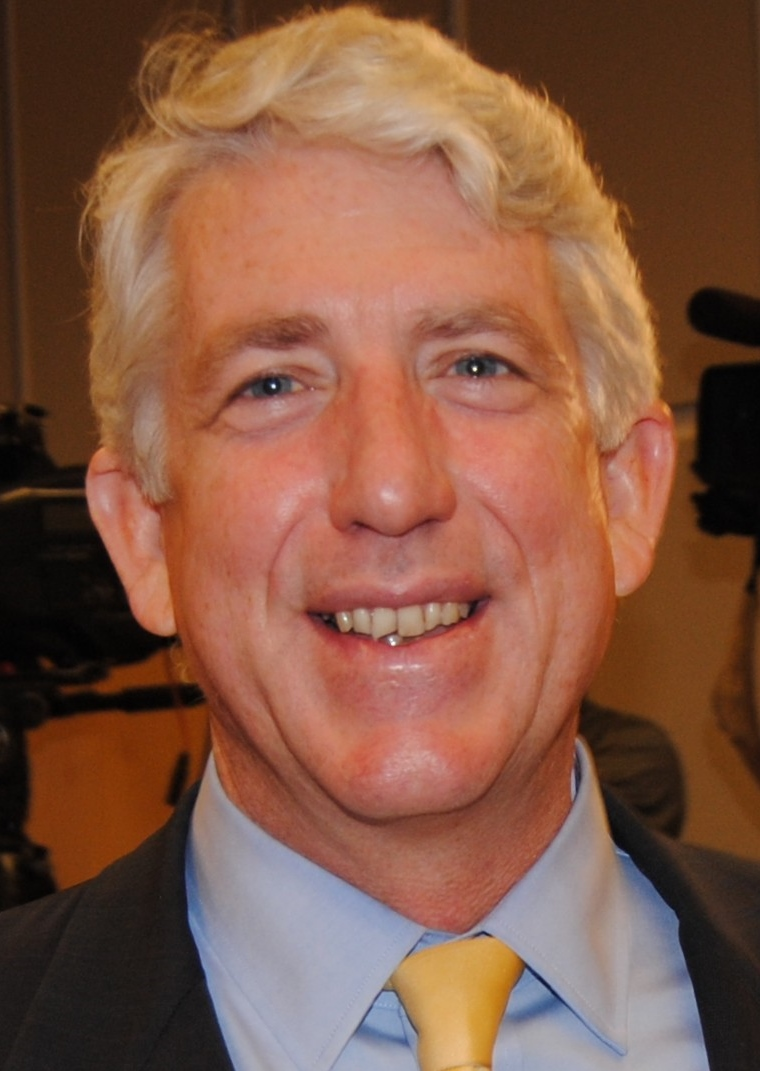

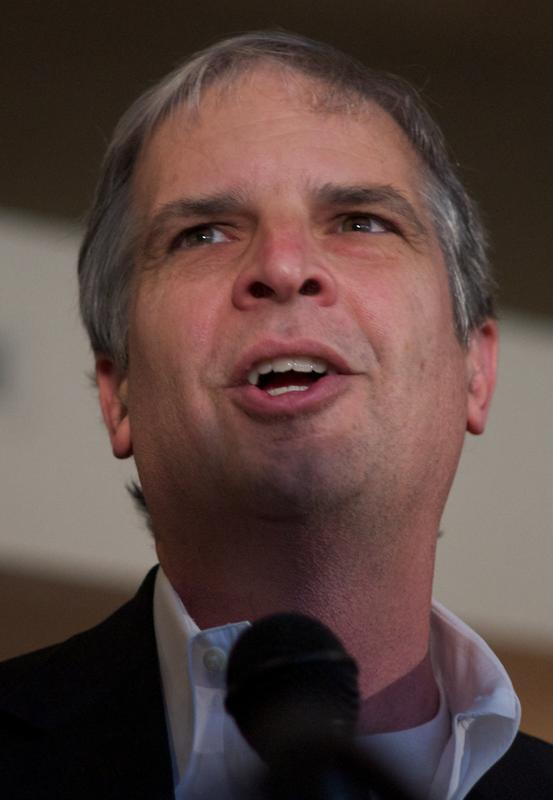
Nominee	Mark Herring	Mark Obenshain
Party	Democratic	Republican
Popular vote	1,105,045	1,104,138
Percentage	49.91%	49.87%
- Herring: 50–60% 60–70% 70–80% 80–90% >90% Obenshain: 50–60% 60–70% 70–80% 80–90% >90% Tie: 50%
Attorney General before election
Ken Cuccinelli
Republican
Elected Attorney General
Mark Herring
Democratic

The 2013 Virginia Attorney General election took place on November 5, 2013, to elect the Attorney General of Virginia. The incumbent Attorney General, Republican Ken Cuccinelli, did not run for re-election. He was instead his party's nominee in the 2013 gubernatorial election.

On May 18, 2013, a Republican state convention in Richmond nominated State Senator Mark Obenshain over State Delegate Rob Bell. The Democratic primary on June 11, 2013, was won by State Senator Mark Herring, who defeated former Assistant United States Attorney Justin Fairfax.

While the statewide elections for governor and lieutenant governor garnered more national attention, the race for attorney general was the most competitive. Obenshain had an election night lead of 1,200 votes. In the following days, as provisional ballots were counted, Herring narrowed the lead and ultimately overtook him. On November 25, the Virginia State Board of Elections certified the results and Herring was declared the winner by 1,103,777 votes to 1,103,612 – a difference of 165 votes out of more than 2.2 million cast, or 0.007%.

After the certification, Obenshain requested a recount, which began on December 16. Obenshain conceded the election on December 18, and later that day, the recount ended with Herring winning by 907 votes, or 0.04%. Democrats held the Attorney General's office for the first time since 1994, and with Herring's victory, Democrats held all five statewide offices – including both U.S. Senate seats – for the first time since 1970.

== Republican nomination ==
=== Candidates ===
==== Nominated at convention ====
- Mark Obenshain, state senator

==== Defeated at convention ====
- Rob Bell, state delegate

==== Withdrew ====
- John Frey, Fairfax County Clerk of the Circuit Court

== Democratic primary ==
=== Candidates ===
==== Declared ====
- Justin Fairfax, former Assistant United States Attorney
- Mark Herring, state senator

==== Withdrew ====
- Michael Signer, attorney and candidate for lieutenant governor in 2009

==== Declined ====
- Ward Armstrong, former Minority Leader of the Virginia House of Delegates

=== Polling ===
Poll source	Date(s) administered	Sample size	Margin of error	Justin Fairfax	Mark Herring	Other	Undecided
Public Policy Polling	May 24–26, 2013	322	± 5.5%	19%	22%	—	59%

=== Results ===
Results by county and independent city: Herring: Herring—80–90%; Herring—70–80%; Herring—60–70%; Herring—50–60%; Tie: Tie; Fairfax: Fairfax—50–60%; Fairfax—60–70%; Fairfax—70–80%; Fairfax—80–90%

Virginia Attorney General Democratic primary, 2013
Party	Candidate	Votes	%	±%
Democratic	Mark Herring	72,861	51.66%	
Democratic	Justin Fairfax	68,177	48.34%	
Majority		4,684	3.32%	
Turnout		141,038		

== General election ==
=== Endorsements ===
Mark Herring (D)

Current and former statewide politicians

Newspapers

- The Virginian-Pilot
- The Washington Post

Organizations

- Virginia Police Benevolent Association
Mark Obenshain (R)

Elected Officials

- Bill Chase, independent Culpeper County Supervisor
- Marty Williams, former Republican state senator

Others

- John Brownlee, former United States Attorney for the Western District of Virginia and 2009 candidate for the Republican nomination for Attorney General

Newspapers

- Richmond Times-Dispatch
- The Roanoke Times

Organizations

- Virginia Fraternal Order of Police

=== Predictions ===
Source	Ranking	As of
Sabato's Crystal Ball	Lean D (flip)	October 24, 2013

=== Polling ===
Poll source	Date(s) administered	Sample size	Margin of error	Mark Obenshain (R)	Mark Herring (D)	Other	Undecided
Public Policy Polling	November 2–3, 2013	870	± 3.3%	45%	47%	—	8%
Christopher Newport University	October 25–30, 2013	1,038	± 3%	45%	43%	—	12%
Public Policy Polling	October 26–27, 2013	709 EV	± 3.6%	42%	54%	—	3%
Hampton University	October 24, 26–27, 2013	800	± 2.9%	45%	39%	—	16%
Washington Post/Abt SRBI	October 24–27, 2013	762	± 4.5%	46%	49%	—	4%
Roanoke College	October 21–27, 2013	838	± 3.4%	35%	46%	—	20%
Christopher Newport University	October 8–13, 2013	753	± 3.6%	46%	45%	—	9%
Watson Center	October 1–6, 2013	886	± 3.1%	42%	45%	—	14%
Roanoke College	September 30–October 5, 2013	1,046	± 3%	38%	35%	—	26%
Hampton University	September 25–29, 2013	800	± 2.9%	41%	37%	—	23%
University of Mary Washington	September 25–29, 2013	559	± 4.7%	42%	36%	6%	16%
Washington Post/Abt SRBI	September 19–22, 2013	562	± 5%	42%	45%	—	14%
Conquest Communications	September 19, 2013	400	±5%	35.8%	24.5%	—	39.8%
NBC/Marist	September 17–19, 2013	546	± 3%	34%	39%	—	26%
Roanoke College	September 9–15, 2013	874	± 3.3%	31%	33%	—	34%
Public Policy Polling	July 11–14, 2013	601	± 4%	36%	38%	—	25%
Roanoke College	July 8–14, 2013	525	± 4.3%	33%	29%	—	38%
Public Policy Polling	May 24–26, 2013	672	± 3.8%	32%	33%	—	34%

Hypothetical polling

Poll source	Date(s) administered	Sample size	Margin of error	Mark Obenshain (R)	Justin Fairfax (D)	Other	Undecided
Public Policy Polling	May 24–26, 2013	672	± 3.8%	32%	30%	—	38%

=== Initial results ===
2013 Virginia Attorney General election
Party	Candidate	Votes	%	±%
Democratic	Mark Herring	1,103,777	49.89%	+7.60%
Republican	Mark Obenshain	1,103,612	49.89%	−7.62%
Write-in		4,892	0.22%	+0.13%
Total votes		2,212,281	100.00%	N/A
Democratic gain from Republican				

=== Recount ===
It was widely reported that a recount was expected after the results were certified on November 25, 2013. According to the Virginia Board of Elections rules, as updated for the November 2013 election: "there are no automatic recounts. Only an apparent losing candidate can ask for a recount, and only if the difference between the apparent winning candidate and that apparent losing candidates is not more than one percent (1%) of the total votes cast for those two candidates." This race is the second of the past three Virginia attorney general elections to go to a recount. In the 2005 race, Bob McDonnell won by 360 votes, with the result certified in December.

Results

Virginia Attorney General election, 2013
Party	Candidate	Votes	%	±%
Democratic	Mark Herring	1,105,045	49.91%	+7.62%
Republican	Mark Obenshain	1,104,138	49.87%	−7.64%
Write-in		4,892	0.22%	+0.13%
Majority		907	0.04%	
Turnout		2,214,075		
Democratic gain from Republican		Swing		

==== By county and independent city ====
Locality	Mark Obenshain Republican		Mark Herring Democratic		Write-in Various		Margin		Totals
Locality	#	%	#	%	#	%	#	%	Totals
Accomack	5,184	57.67%	3,789	42.15%	16	0.18%	−1,395	−15.52%	8,989
Albemarle	14,679	42.43%	19,876	57.45%	44	0.13%	5,197	15.02%	34,599
Alexandria	10,423	25.54%	30,279	74.18%	115	0.28%	19,856	48.65%	40,817
Alleghany	2,395	59.46%	1,627	40.39%	6	0.15%	−768	−19.07%	4,028
Amelia	2,721	65.16%	1,448	34.67%	7	0.17%	−1,273	−30.48%	4,176
Amherst	5,857	66.01%	3,008	33.90%	8	0.09%	−2,849	−32.11%	8,873
Appomattox	3,692	73.77%	1,301	25.99%	12	0.24%	−2,391	−47.77%	5,005
Arlington	16,694	24.99%	49,919	74.72%	192	0.29%	33,225	49.73%	66,805
Augusta	14,959	74.24%	5,160	25.61%	30	0.15%	−9,799	−48.63%	20,149
Bath	785	66.02%	402	33.81%	2	0.17%	−383	−32.21%	1,189
Bedford	18,631	75.09%	6,141	24.75%	38	0.15%	−12,490	−50.34%	24,810
Bland	1,368	75.92%	432	23.97%	2	0.11%	−936	−51.94%	1,802
Botetourt	8,342	73.94%	2,920	25.88%	20	0.18%	−5,422	−48.06%	11,282
Bristol	2,740	69.30%	1,205	30.48%	9	0.23%	−1,535	−38.82%	3,954
Brunswick	1,760	39.64%	2,677	60.29%	3	0.07%	917	20.65%	4,440
Buchanan	3,209	67.67%	1,529	32.24%	4	0.08%	−1,680	−35.43%	4,742
Buckingham	2,226	55.07%	1,813	44.85%	3	0.07%	−413	−10.22%	4,042
Buena Vista	803	65.28%	425	34.55%	2	0.16%	−378	−30.73%	1,230
Campbell	11,776	75.59%	3,787	24.31%	16	0.10%	−7,989	−51.28%	15,579
Caroline	3,722	48.22%	3,973	51.48%	23	0.30%	251	3.25%	7,718
Carroll	5,466	70.85%	2,240	29.03%	9	0.12%	−3,226	−41.81%	7,715
Charles City	927	36.92%	1,581	62.96%	3	0.12%	654	26.05%	2,511
Charlotte	2,296	62.92%	1,350	37.00%	3	0.08%	−946	−25.92%	3,649
Charlottesville	2,506	20.35%	9,797	79.54%	14	0.11%	7,291	59.19%	12,317
Chesapeake	31,700	50.67%	30,706	49.08%	157	0.25%	−994	−1.59%	62,563
Chesterfield	57,099	54.92%	46,508	44.73%	358	0.34%	−10,591	−10.19%	103,965
Clarke	2,708	55.69%	2,150	44.21%	5	0.10%	−558	−11.47%	4,863
Colonial Heights	3,631	73.24%	1,310	26.42%	17	0.34%	−2,321	−46.81%	4,958
Covington	674	54.49%	562	45.43%	1	0.08%	−112	−9.05%	1,237
Craig	1,178	73.40%	425	26.48%	2	0.12%	−753	−46.92%	1,605
Culpeper	7,567	64.03%	4,231	35.80%	20	0.17%	−3,336	−28.23%	11,818
Cumberland	1,603	56.25%	1,243	43.61%	4	0.14%	−360	−12.63%	2,850
Danville	5,182	50.10%	5,158	49.86%	4	0.04%	−24	−0.23%	10,344
Dickenson	2,213	65.03%	1,184	34.79%	6	0.18%	−1,029	−30.24%	3,403
Dinwiddie	3,810	52.01%	3,502	47.81%	13	0.18%	−308	−4.20%	7,325
Emporia	653	40.81%	945	59.06%	2	0.13%	292	18.25%	1,600
Essex	1,618	52.79%	1,445	47.15%	2	0.07%	−173	−5.64%	3,065
Fairfax City	2,948	41.48%	4,150	58.39%	9	0.13%	1,202	16.91%	7,107
Fairfax County	117,425	38.74%	184,963	61.03%	695	0.23%	67,538	22.28%	303,083
Falls Church	1,281	26.13%	3,613	73.70%	8	0.16%	2,332	47.57%	4,902
Fauquier	12,936	62.01%	7,883	37.79%	41	0.20%	−5,053	−24.22%	20,860
Floyd	2,935	65.18%	1,565	34.75%	3	0.07%	−1,370	−30.42%	4,503
Fluvanna	4,241	54.45%	3,533	45.36%	15	0.19%	−708	−9.09%	7,789
Franklin City	933	40.92%	1,343	58.90%	4	0.18%	410	17.98%	2,280
Franklin County	11,031	68.78%	4,981	31.06%	27	0.17%	−6,050	−37.72%	16,039
Frederick	13,525	66.25%	6,859	33.60%	30	0.15%	−6,666	−32.65%	20,414
Fredericksburg	2,297	38.42%	3,672	61.41%	10	0.17%	1,375	23.00%	5,979
Galax	816	64.61%	446	35.31%	1	0.08%	−370	−29.30%	1,263
Giles	3,330	68.52%	1,521	31.30%	9	0.19%	−1,809	−37.22%	4,860
Gloucester	7,338	66.07%	3,752	33.78%	16	0.14%	−3,586	−32.29%	11,106
Goochland	5,683	62.64%	3,369	37.14%	20	0.22%	−2,314	−25.51%	9,072
Grayson	3,277	68.95%	1,476	31.05%	0	0.00%	−1,801	−37.89%	4,753
Greene	3,414	64.71%	1,850	35.06%	12	0.23%	−1,564	−29.64%	5,276
Greensville	1,105	39.06%	1,723	60.90%	1	0.04%	618	21.85%	2,829
Halifax	5,779	60.36%	3,778	39.46%	17	0.18%	−2,001	−20.90%	9,574
Hampton	11,731	32.26%	24,557	67.54%	73	0.20%	12,826	35.27%	36,361
Hanover	25,705	66.79%	12,621	32.79%	161	0.42%	−13,084	−34.00%	38,487
Harrisonburg	3,877	48.71%	4,063	51.05%	19	0.24%	186	2.34%	7,959
Henrico	45,580	44.51%	56,503	55.18%	321	0.31%	10,923	10.67%	102,404
Henry	8,487	64.49%	4,653	35.36%	20	0.15%	−3,834	−29.13%	13,160
Highland	602	67.64%	288	32.36%	0	0.00%	−314	−35.28%	890
Hopewell	2,685	51.34%	2,530	48.37%	15	0.29%	−155	−2.96%	5,230
Isle of Wight	7,134	59.33%	4,867	40.47%	24	0.20%	−2,267	−18.85%	12,025
James City	14,952	55.92%	11,708	43.79%	76	0.28%	−3,244	−12.13%	26,736
King and Queen	1,153	53.98%	982	45.97%	1	0.05%	−171	−8.01%	2,136
King George	4,125	62.47%	2,462	37.29%	16	0.24%	−1,663	−25.19%	6,603
King William	3,277	63.35%	1,878	36.30%	18	0.35%	−1,399	−27.04%	5,173
Lancaster	2,564	57.32%	1,895	42.37%	14	0.31%	−669	−14.96%	4,473
Lee	3,611	75.83%	1,146	24.07%	5	0.10%	−2,465	−51.76%	4,762
Lexington	558	37.15%	941	62.65%	3	0.20%	383	25.50%	1,502
Loudoun	41,316	46.50%	47,349	53.29%	187	0.21%	6,033	6.79%	88,852
Louisa	5,907	60.06%	3,907	39.73%	21	0.21%	−2,000	−20.34%	9,835
Lunenburg	1,819	56.06%	1,419	43.73%	7	0.22%	−400	−12.33%	3,245
Lynchburg	11,448	58.38%	8,126	41.44%	37	0.19%	−3,322	−16.94%	19,611
Madison	2,756	62.85%	1,624	37.04%	5	0.11%	−1,132	−25.82%	4,385
Manassas	3,997	49.11%	4,124	50.67%	18	0.22%	127	1.56%	8,139
Manassas Park	921	43.77%	1,178	55.99%	5	0.24%	257	12.21%	2,104
Martinsville	1,543	46.21%	1,788	53.55%	8	0.24%	245	7.34%	3,339
Mathews	2,214	64.72%	1,205	35.22%	2	0.06%	−1,009	−29.49%	3,421
Mecklenburg	4,411	60.59%	2,868	39.40%	1	0.01%	−1,543	−21.20%	7,280
Middlesex	2,376	61.89%	1,458	37.98%	5	0.13%	−918	−23.91%	3,839
Montgomery	11,978	51.95%	11,039	47.87%	42	0.18%	−939	−4.07%	23,059
Nelson	2,588	48.93%	2,685	50.77%	16	0.30%	97	1.83%	5,289
New Kent	4,791	66.21%	2,412	33.33%	33	0.46%	−2,379	−32.88%	7,236
Newport News	16,694	39.91%	25,036	59.85%	100	0.24%	8,342	19.94%	41,830
Norfolk	13,716	30.30%	31,404	69.39%	140	0.31%	17,688	39.08%	45,260
Northampton	1,854	47.78%	2,020	52.06%	6	0.15%	166	4.28%	3,880
Northumberland	3,033	58.96%	2,101	40.84%	10	0.19%	−932	−18.12%	5,144
Norton	524	60.86%	335	38.91%	2	0.23%	−189	−21.95%	861
Nottoway	2,096	53.28%	1,830	46.52%	8	0.20%	−266	−6.76%	3,934
Orange	5,954	60.07%	3,929	39.64%	29	0.29%	−2,025	−20.43%	9,912
Page	4,095	67.74%	1,942	32.13%	8	0.13%	−2,153	−35.62%	6,045
Patrick	3,548	71.49%	1,412	28.45%	3	0.06%	−2,136	−43.04%	4,963
Petersburg	953	11.64%	7,219	88.18%	15	0.18%	6,266	76.54%	8,187
Pittsylvania	12,411	68.73%	5,627	31.16%	20	0.11%	−6,784	−37.57%	18,058
Poquoson	3,216	73.66%	1,130	25.88%	20	0.46%	−2,086	−47.78%	4,366
Portsmouth	7,784	30.51%	17,655	69.19%	77	0.30%	9,871	38.69%	25,516
Powhatan	7,356	73.01%	2,693	26.73%	26	0.26%	−4,663	−46.28%	10,075
Prince Edward	2,453	47.69%	2,680	52.10%	11	0.21%	227	4.41%	5,144
Prince George	5,375	58.28%	3,816	41.38%	31	0.34%	−1,559	−16.91%	9,222
Prince William	44,163	45.79%	52,109	54.03%	179	0.19%	7,946	8.24%	96,451
Pulaski	5,298	66.08%	2,709	33.79%	10	0.12%	−2,589	−32.29%	8,017
Radford	1,500	51.64%	1,401	48.23%	4	0.14%	−99	−3.41%	2,905
Rappahannock	1,572	54.11%	1,325	45.61%	8	0.28%	−247	−8.50%	2,905
Richmond City	12,678	22.05%	44,684	77.72%	133	0.23%	32,006	55.67%	57,495
Richmond County	1,393	62.33%	836	37.40%	6	0.27%	−557	−24.92%	2,235
Roanoke City	9,462	44.16%	11,931	55.68%	34	0.16%	2,469	11.52%	21,427
Roanoke County	20,550	66.85%	10,122	32.93%	67	0.22%	−10,428	−33.92%	30,739
Rockbridge	4,046	61.28%	2,546	38.56%	10	0.15%	−1,500	−22.72%	6,602
Rockingham	16,562	75.18%	5,426	24.63%	41	0.19%	−11,136	−50.55%	22,029
Russell	4,124	68.87%	1,857	31.01%	7	0.12%	−2,267	−37.86%	5,988
Salem	4,652	65.45%	2,437	34.29%	19	0.27%	−2,215	−31.16%	7,108
Scott	4,185	79.35%	1,084	20.55%	5	0.09%	−3,101	−58.80%	5,274
Shenandoah	7,918	68.85%	3,555	30.91%	27	0.23%	−4,363	−37.94%	11,500
Smyth	5,338	71.55%	2,113	28.32%	9	0.12%	−3,225	−43.23%	7,460
Southampton	2,737	54.25%	2,307	45.73%	1	0.02%	−430	−8.52%	5,045
Spotsylvania	18,298	58.33%	13,002	41.45%	68	0.22%	−5,296	−16.88%	31,368
Stafford	19,232	56.95%	14,460	42.82%	76	0.23%	−4,772	−14.13%	33,768
Staunton	3,345	52.57%	3,004	47.21%	14	0.22%	−341	−5.36%	6,363
Suffolk	10,825	45.60%	12,887	54.29%	27	0.11%	2,062	8.69%	23,739
Surry	1,076	40.73%	1,559	59.01%	7	0.26%	483	18.28%	2,642
Sussex	1,373	43.04%	1,816	56.93%	1	0.03%	443	13.89%	3,190
Tazewell	7,268	74.56%	2,474	25.38%	6	0.06%	−4,794	−49.18%	9,748
Virginia Beach	57,260	53.68%	49,209	46.13%	202	0.19%	−8,051	−7.55%	106,671
Warren	6,087	63.47%	3,484	36.33%	20	0.21%	−2,603	−27.14%	9,591
Washington	10,547	73.60%	3,767	26.29%	16	0.11%	−6,780	−47.31%	14,330
Waynesboro	2,900	58.75%	2,029	41.11%	7	0.14%	−871	−17.65%	4,936
Westmoreland	2,181	50.51%	2,128	49.28%	9	0.21%	−53	−1.23%	4,318
Williamsburg	1,508	35.10%	2,770	64.48%	18	0.42%	1,262	29.38%	4,296
Winchester	2,918	51.40%	2,748	48.41%	11	0.19%	−170	−2.99%	5,677
Wise	6,092	74.39%	2,080	25.40%	17	0.21%	−4,012	−48.99%	8,189
Wythe	5,408	70.65%	2,226	29.08%	21	0.27%	−3,182	−41.57%	7,655
York	12,857	61.28%	8,062	38.42%	63	0.30%	−4,795	−22.85%	20,982
Totals	1,103,612	49.89%	1,103,777	49.89%	4,892	0.22%	165	0.01%	2,212,281

==== By congressional district ====
Despite losing the state, Obenshain won seven of 11 congressional districts, while Herring won four, including one held by a Republican.

District	Obenshain	Herring	Representative
1st	56%	44%	Rob Wittman
2nd	52%	48%	Scott Rigell
3rd	23%	77%	Robert C. Scott
4th	53%	47%	Randy Forbes
5th	57%	43%	Robert Hurt
6th	64%	36%	Bob Goodlatte
7th	58%	42%	Eric Cantor
8th	29%	71%	Jim Moran
9th	67%	33%	Morgan Griffith
10th	49.999%	50.001%	Frank Wolf
11th	37%	63%	Gerry Connolly

== See also ==
- 2013 Virginia elections
- 2013 Virginia gubernatorial election
- 2013 Virginia lieutenant gubernatorial election
- 2013 United States gubernatorial elections
