= 2018 Virginia ballot measures =

The 2018 Virginia State Elections took place on Election Day, November 6, 2018, the same day as the U.S. Senate and U.S. House elections in the state. The only statewide election on the ballot were two constitutional referendums to amend the Virginia State Constitution. Because Virginia state elections are held on off-years, no statewide officers or state legislative elections were held. The referendum was referred to the voters by the Virginia General Assembly. The amendment easily passed, although final vote totals await the final certification of results by the state board of elections.

== Question 1 ==
The amendment reads: "Should a county, city, or town be authorized to provide a partial tax exemption for real property that is subject to recurrent flooding, if flooding resiliency improvements have been made on the property?"

Question 1
Choice	Votes	%
For	2,305,867	70.73
Against	954,252	29.27
Total	3,260,119	100.00

== Question 2 ==
The amendment reads: "Shall the real property tax exemption for a primary residence that is currently provided to the surviving spouses of veterans who had a one hundred percent service-connected, permanent, and total disability be amended to allow the surviving spouse to move to a different primary residence and still claim the exemption?"

Question 1
Choice	Votes	%
For	2,755,941	84.37
Against	510,399	15.63
Total	3,266,340	100.00
