= John Donley Adams =

American lawyer (born 1973)

John Adams
- Born: John Donley Adams; November 2, 1973 (age 52); Richmond, Virginia, U.S.
- Education: Virginia Military Institute (BS); University of Virginia (JD)
- Political party: Republican
- Spouse: Lisa
- Children: 4
- Relatives: Adams political family
- Military Service
- Branch: United States Navy
- Service years: 1996–2000

John Donley Adams (born November 2, 1973) is an American lawyer from Virginia. He is a partner at McGuire Woods, where he chairs the Government Investigations Department and co-chairs the Appellate Team. Adams ran for Attorney General of Virginia in 2017 and received the Republican nomination, but was defeated in the general election by incumbent Democrat Mark Herring. Adams is a member of the Adams political family.

== Early life and education ==
Adams is the youngest of four brothers. His grandfather, the Rev. Theodore F. Adams (1898–1980), led the First Baptist Church of Richmond (1936–1968), and the Baptist World Alliance (1955-1960). He was born into the prominent Adams family and is the third cousin, seven times removed, of US President John Adams. After graduation from Midlothian High School, Adams attended the Virginia Military Institute (VMI) and became executive officer of the VMII Corps of Cadets. Adams graduated from VMI as a distinguished graduate with a bachelor's degree in economics in 1996.

After commissioning out of VMI as an ensign in the U.S. Navy, Adams served two tours of duty, from 1996 to 2000, including deployment to Iraq during the decade-long Operation Southern Watch. Adams lived in Pearl Harbor, Hawaii, as well as Virginia Beach during his military service. Upon leaving the Navy in 2000, Adams attended the University of Virginia School of Law in Charlottesville, where he became managing editor of the law review. After graduation, he clerked for Judge David B. Sentelle of the United States Court of Appeals for the District of Columbia Circuit in 2003–2004. After working at Hunton & Williams, LLP, he clerked for Justice Clarence Thomas at the United States Supreme Court in 2006–2007.

== Career ==
Adams joined the Office of White House Counsel in 2007 as an associate counsel in the administration of President George W. Bush, and lived in Arlington, Virginia. He dealt with matters arising from the U.S. Department of Defense and U.S. State Department. In 2008, Adams returned to Richmond, serving as an assistant U.S. Attorney for the Eastern District of Virginia. Among his cases, Adams prosecuted John W. Forbes, a former state finance secretary who pleaded guilty and in late 2010 was sentenced to serve 10 years in prison for diverting about $4 million of a $5 million grant from the state Tobacco Indemnification and Community Revitalization Commission (which had intended to improve literacy in Southside Virginia and southwestern Virginia) to shell companies he controlled and his personal benefit.

In 2010 Adams joined McGuire Woods as a partner, and has conducted a private legal practice there since, other than his leave of absence during his Attorney General run. He heads the firm's government investigations and white-collar litigation department and co-chairs the appellate team, where according to the Richmond Times-Dispatch, most of his cases have concerned matters in states other than Virginia. His elder brother Theodore F. "Tray" Adams III works for McGuire Woods Consulting as senior vice president of state government relations. In 2013, Adams led the successful defense of a bank executive in a ten-week jury trial brought by the Department of Justice, while four other defendants were convicted. In 2014, Adams was appointed by the Fourth Circuit as amicus counsel in U.S. v. Williams, to defend the decision of a U.S. District Judge concerning certain provisions of the U.S. Sentencing Guidelines with which both the U.S. Attorney's office and defendant disagreed (as ultimately did the appellate panel).

Adams filed two successful briefs in cases in the United States Supreme Court opposing parts of the Affordable Care Act as inconsistent with the Religious Freedom Restoration Act. In 2014, representing 15 members of Congress, Adams filed an amicus brief concerning the law's contraception mandate, which the Supreme Court ultimately struck down in Burwell v. Hobby Lobby Stores, Inc. The following year Adams filed an amicus brief on behalf of an order of nuns in one of the cases consolidated in Zubik v. Burwell, which the U.S. Supreme Court ultimately sent down to the relevant appellate courts after the death of Justice Antonin Scalia and further briefing.

== 2017 campaign for Attorney General of Virginia ==
A Republican, Adams ran for Attorney General of Virginia against incumbent Democrat Mark Herring in 2017. He secured the Republican nomination after the initial frontrunner, Del. Rob Bell, withdrew from the race and Chuck Smith failed to qualify for the primary ballot.

The Virginia State Bar organized a debate between the two attorney general candidates in Virginia Beach on June 19, 2017. Their final debate was hosted by the Loudoun Chamber of Commerce on October 20, 2017.

Adams portrayed himself as a classic conservative. The majority of Adams' campaign funds were donated through the Republican Attorneys General Association (RAGA). In March 2017, RAGA abandoned its previous agreement not to target the other party's incumbents in the general election. The Democratic Attorneys General group donated $1.75 million to Herring, thus becoming the largest donor to his campaign.

Both candidates claimed to want to remove politics from the office, but by Labor Day Weekend, televised attack ads had begun. As the election neared and absentee voting began in Virginia, such ads increased. The Campus Election Engagement Project published a nonpartisan list of their respective campaign positions.

Herring defeated Adams on Election Day, by a margin of 168,551 votes (6.6% of the total vote).

== Personal life ==
Adams and his wife Lisa have four sons.

== See also ==
- List of law clerks for the tenth seat of the Supreme Court of the United States
