= Richard Lee Morton =

American historian (1889–1974)

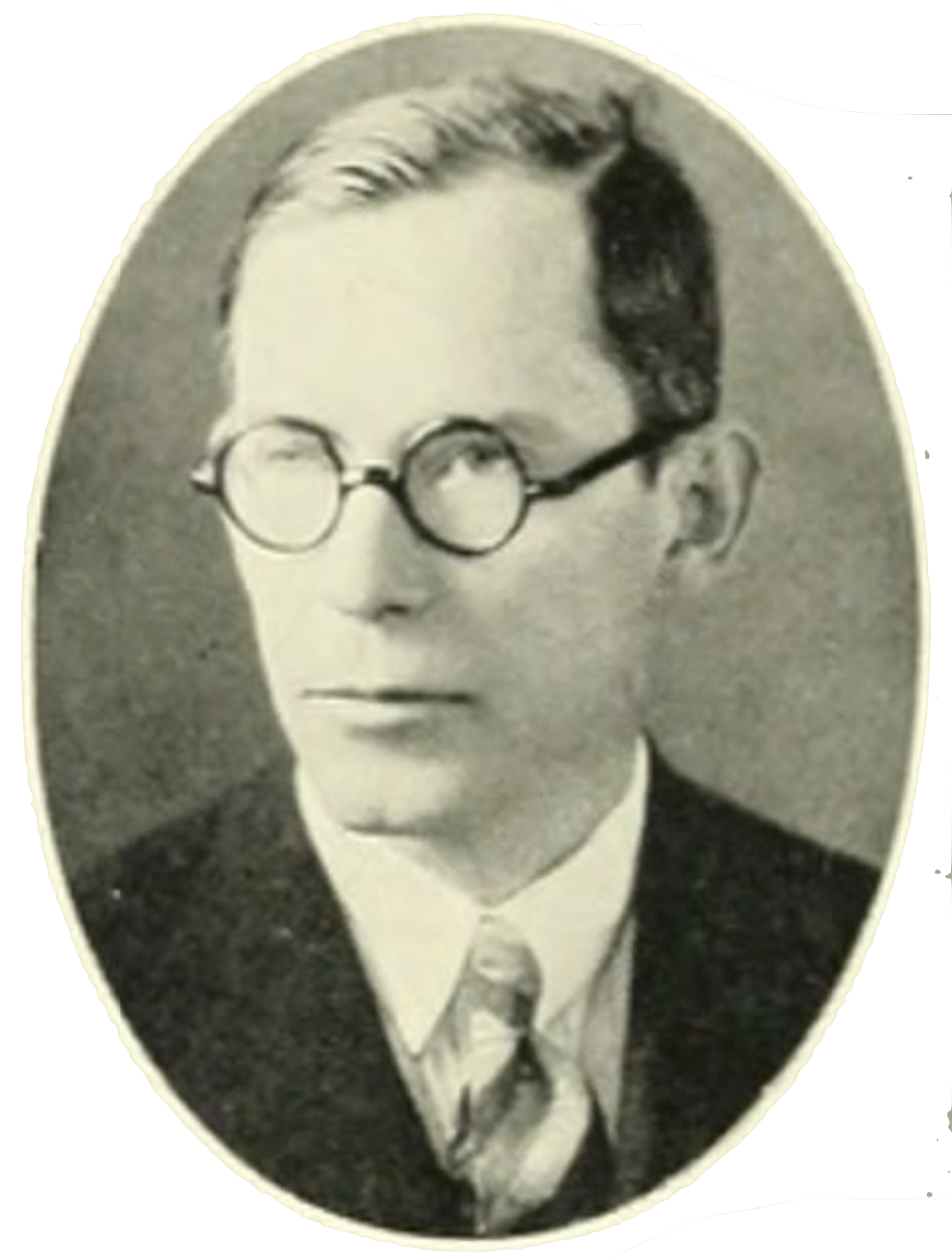
- Morton in 1927
- Born: September 20, 1889; Prince Edward County, Virginia, US
- Died: September 8, 1974 (aged 84); Williamsburg, Virginia, US
- Burial place: Cedar Grove Cemetery, Williamsburg, Virginia, US
- Spouse: Estelle (Dinwiddie) Morton

Academic background
- Education: Hampden–Sydney College (BA 1910); University of Virginia (MA 1915, PhD 1918); Harvard University (MA 1917)
- Thesis: The Negro in Virginia Politics, 1865–1902 (1919)

Academic work
- Discipline: History
- Institutions: College of William & Mary
- Main interests: Virginia
- Notable works: Colonial Virginia (1960)

Richard Lee Morton (September 20, 1889 – September 8, 1974) was an American historian, professor, author, and editor who led the history department at the College of William & Mary in Williamsburg, Virginia, United States. While a professor at William & Mary for nearly 40 years, Morton helped relaunch the William and Mary Quarterly in its third series and served as its editor. Morton was considered a leader among the college's staff and led the faculty's response to the 1951 William & Mary scandal. Morton authored and co-authored several histories of Virginia, including his 1960 Colonial Virginia, a two-volume text that became the standard work on the subject.

After his 1959 retirement from William & Mary, the college named an academic hall for him. Morton Hall was renamed in 2021 due to racist and white supremacist ideas in some of Morton's works, including his doctoral thesis, The Negro in Virginia Politics. The William and Mary Quarterly began awarding a prize named after Morton in 1986; the prize has since been renamed.

== Early life and education ==
Morton in his 1910 Hampden–Sydney College yearbook photo

Morton was born in Prince Edward County, Virginia, on September 20, 1889, to John Robert Morton and Mildred Henry Morton (née Watkins). From the Falkland area of the county, Morton listed his birthplace as Meherrin on his 1918 draft registration card. Morton was first educated in a log schoolhouse. He attended Hampden–Sydney College in Hampden Sydney, Virginia, graduating with a Bachelor of Arts degree in 1910. He then received a Master of Arts degree from the University of Virginia in Charlottesville, Virginia, in 1915. He received another Master of Arts degree from Harvard University in 1917. Morton completed his PhD at the University of Virginia in 1918.

In 1917 and 1918, Morton was the Phelps Stokes Fellow at the University of Virginia. The fellowship was sponsored by the Phelps Stokes Fund to encourage interest in African-American history from white southern scholars in hopes of improving cooperation between races. Morton was drafted into the US Army during World War I, serving in 1918.

== Career ==
=== Teaching ===
Morton would later say that, while a student at the University of Virginia, he had told a professor that the "[College of] William & Mary is going to grow. That man, [college president J. A. C.] Chandler, is a promoter. He'll build that place." In 1919, Morton became an associate professor of history and political science at the College of William & Mary in Williamsburg, Virginia, where he would teach for 40 years. Upon his arrival at the college, he was made the acting head of the joint department. Under Chandler, the college expanded such that history and political were split into separate departments. He was made professor of history and the chairman of the history department in 1921, a position he held until his retirement from the college in 1959.

On January 14, 1922, the college formally opened the Marshall–Wythe School of Law, which was initially led by the lawyer and later Virginia governor John Garland Pollard. Morton was one of several professors from the college to begin teaching at the new law school. In practice, the law school produced law degrees but comprised little more than professors who had a new title but remained within their original departments at the college. After Pollard left the school in 1929, it gradually faded into obscurity over the 1930s.

=== 1951 scandal ===
In the years preceding the 1951 William & Mary scandal, the William & Mary Indians football program had a run of winning seasons in what was referred to as "big-time" football under the successive head coaches Carl M. Voyles and Rube McCray. The William & Mary Indians men's basketball team, under head coach Barney Wilson, had also enjoyed success in the prior seasons. In 1951, it became public knowledge that the coaching staff and college athletic department had falsified grades and pressured professors into giving students on the football team better scores. As the misconduct was revealed, the college faculty met on July 3, 1951, and chose Morton as the chairman of a faculty board to investigate the misconduct by McCray and Wilson.

On September 17, 1951, the William & Mary faculty voted unanimously to support a document criticizing the administration of the college's athletic program. The document described the athletic program as a malignant presence at the college in the wake of the scandal. Morton signed the original document, which was published in The Flat Hat on September 20 and became known as the "Manifesto" on campus. In response to the scandal, McCray, Wilson, and president John Edwin Pomfret resigned. Alvin Duke Chandler, a vice admiral in the US Navy and son of J. A. C. Chandler, was selected to become William & Mary's next president.

=== Writing and editing ===
Morton's first article, "The Virginia State Debt and Internal Improvements, 1820–38", was published in the Journal of Political Economy in 1917. Morton's doctoral thesis, published in 1919 by the University Press of Virginia as part of its Phelps–Stokes Fellowship Papers series, was The Negro in Virginia Politics, 1865–1902. Morton's monograph considered African-American political involvement after the American Civil War to be a failure. According to Morton's thesis and other works by white historians of that period, African Americans had been conditioned by slavery such that they could not avoid voting against their interests. A 1920 negative review in The Journal of Negro History said "the whole study is from the white man's point of view" and that Morton believed racial harmony had been achieved in Virginia through the exclusion of African Americans from politics. Morton's thesis was later reprinted.

For his work on the social and economic history of Virginia in the period since 1850, Morton received an award from the Social Science Research Council in 1931. The Institute of Early American History and Culture was created in December 1943 as part of then-William & Mary president Pomfret's push for increased research activity by the college. As an independent organization, it was jointly sponsored by the college and Colonial Williamsburg. One of the roles the institute would take on was publication of the William and Mary Quarterly. The quarterly, which had been edited by the college's librarian Earl Gregg Swem, had previously focused on Virginian history and genealogy. In January 1944, with Morton as its new head editor, it began publishing its third series with a broadened scope that included the history of the area that became the US from 1492 to 1815. Morton remained the journal's editor until 1947.

Morton also published in other journals, including The American Historical Review, Maryland Historical Magazine, The American Scholar, Mississippi Valley Historical Review, and North Carolina Historical Review. He published several journal articles on Hugh Jones, an early 18th-century mathematics professor at William & Mary; Morton edited a printing of Jones's 1724 The Present State of Virginia published by the University of North Carolina Press in 1956.

In 1960, Morton's two-volume monograph Colonial Virginia was published by the University of North Carolina Press on behalf of the Virginia Historical Society, covering the Colony of Virginia up to 1763. The historian O. H. Olsen of the College of William & Mary, Norfolk, commended the narrative structure of Colonial Virginia in a review for the Marxist journal Science & Society. Olsen also praised its "so many tidbits of information, such as those on the mistreatment of the Indians or on discontent and revolt among the slaves, or on upper class attitudes toward the 'rabble,' or on the importance of whiskey in local elections". The Irish historian David Beers Quinn reviewed Colonial Virginia for The English Historical Review. While he praised Morton's coverage of Virginia's westward expansion, Quinn criticized the absence of "analysis of labour supply, of the problems of the tobacco trade, or of Indian relations", as well as Morton's "ultra-conservative approach". Morton had intended to publish a work that covered the period after 1763. Through 1996, Colonial Virginia was one of only two comprehensive histories of an entire period of Virginia history.

== Personal life and death ==
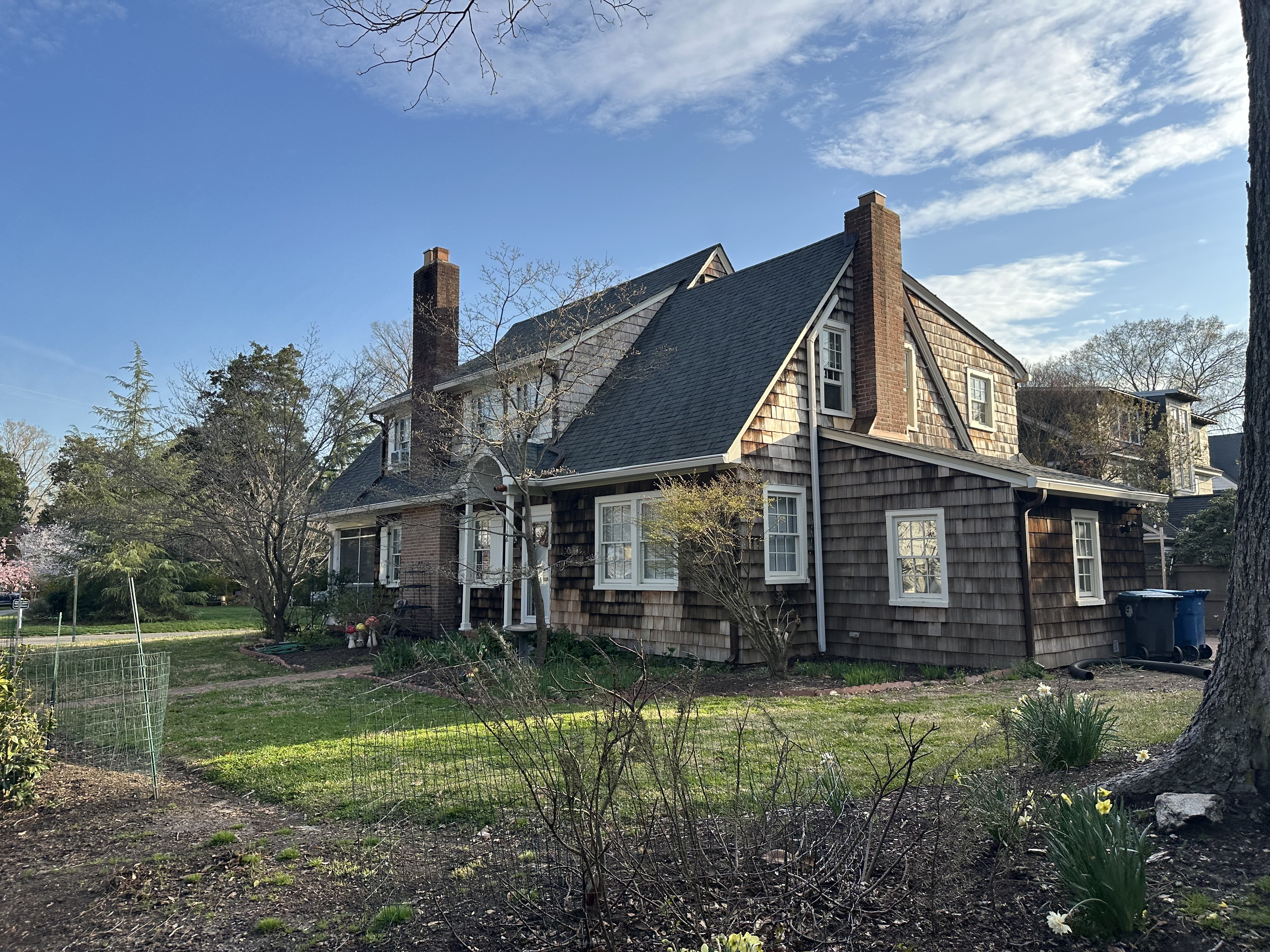
The Morton House in Chandler Court, 2026

On December 20, 1919, Morton married Lilie Estelle Dinwiddie. Known as Estelle, Morton's wife would assist in his historical writings. The couple had two children, daughters Mary Louise Morton (born 1921) and Nancy Dinwiddie Morton (born 1926). The couple were Episcopalians, and he served as a junior warden at Bruton Parish Church in Williamsburg.

Morton lived in the Chandler Court neighborhood of Williamsburg, a suburban development conceived by John Garland Pollard that housed many William & Mary faculty adjacent to the campus. Morton had his home built in 1923 across the common green on Chandler Court from Swem. Morton also had a house built in the neighborhood in 1931 to serve as rental property.

Swem and Morton were neighbors for about 30 years. Swem, who was from Iowa but had adopted conservative values of the Old South, had been a founding editor of the second series of the William and Mary Quarterly. Morton had rarely left Virginia since his birth but was a Democrat with liberal political and social values. Swem said that he and Morton lived amicably near one another and did not discuss their political differences. Morton and his wife would give Swem and his wife rides to vote, with Morton commenting that their votes would cancel each other out.

Morton died in Williamsburg Community Hospital in Williamsburg on September 8, 1974, after a period of declining health. At the time of his death, his wife was being treated as a patient in the same hospital. Two sisters and a brother, all residents of Virginia, survived Morton, as did his daughters. His funeral was held in the Williamsburg Presbyterian Church and buried at Cedar Grove Cemetery in Williamsburg.

== Honors and legacy ==
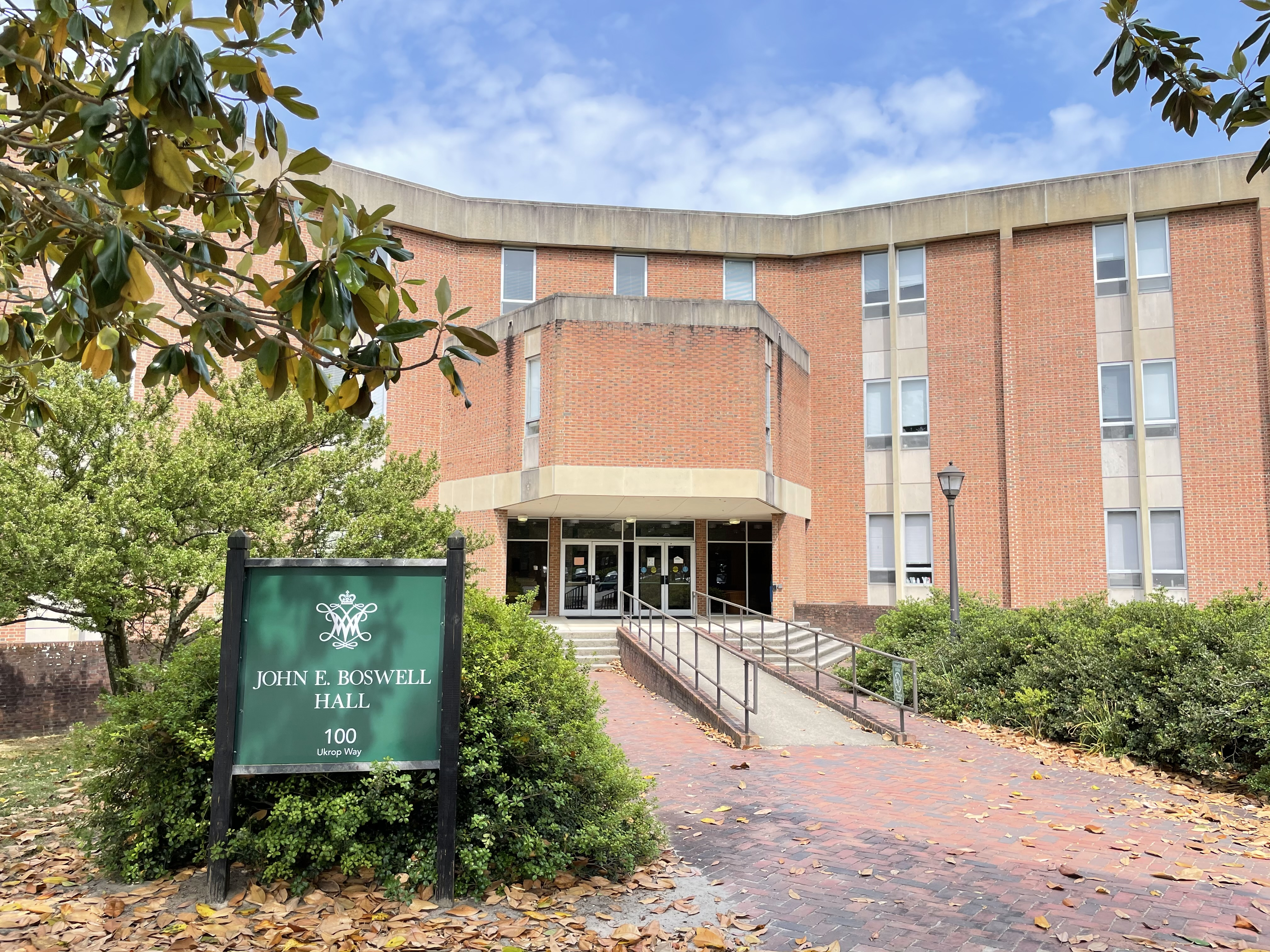
Boswell Hall on William & Mary's campus was initially named in Morton's honor.

Morton received honorary degrees from Hampden–Sydney College and the College of William & Mary. The Virginia Historical Society named him as one of its eleven honorary members. Upon his retirement from teaching, students established a scholarship in his name and the William and Mary Quarterly dedicated an issue in his honor.

A new academic hall on William & Mary's campus was dedicated in honor of Morton, the first time the college named a building for a living person. When it opened in 1972, Morton Hall housed the Marshall-Wythe Institute, the John Marshall Papers, and the departments of economics, government, history, and sociology. In 2021, the building was one of several that was considered by a self-study performed by the college regarding the role of slavery and racism on the campus. Morton's published works, such as The Negro in Virginia Politics, 1865–1902, contained racist and white supremacist ideas. For this reason, the building was renamed for John Boswell, an alumnus of the college who taught at Yale University, with a rededication in August 2021.

The Art Commission of the Commonwealth of Virginia commissioned the artist David Silvette to paint a portrait of Morton for display in Morton Hall. When Silvette presented the portrait to the commission in 1972, the commission conditioned their acceptance of the painting on Silvette modifying it. A series of court cases followed, with Silvette arguing that the commission's requirement that he modify the painting was a violation of Silvette's First Amendment right to free expression. The Virginia Supreme Court and federal District Court for the Eastern District of Virginia both rejected Silvette's argument. The painting of Morton was placed on display in Morton Hall without modification.

The Richard L. Morton Award, a prize awarded by the William and Mary Quarterly to an article with an author who was in graduate research when they made the article's final submission to the journal, was established in 1986. It has since been renamed as the WMQ New Voices Award.
