= Lester J. Cappon =

American historian and documentary editor

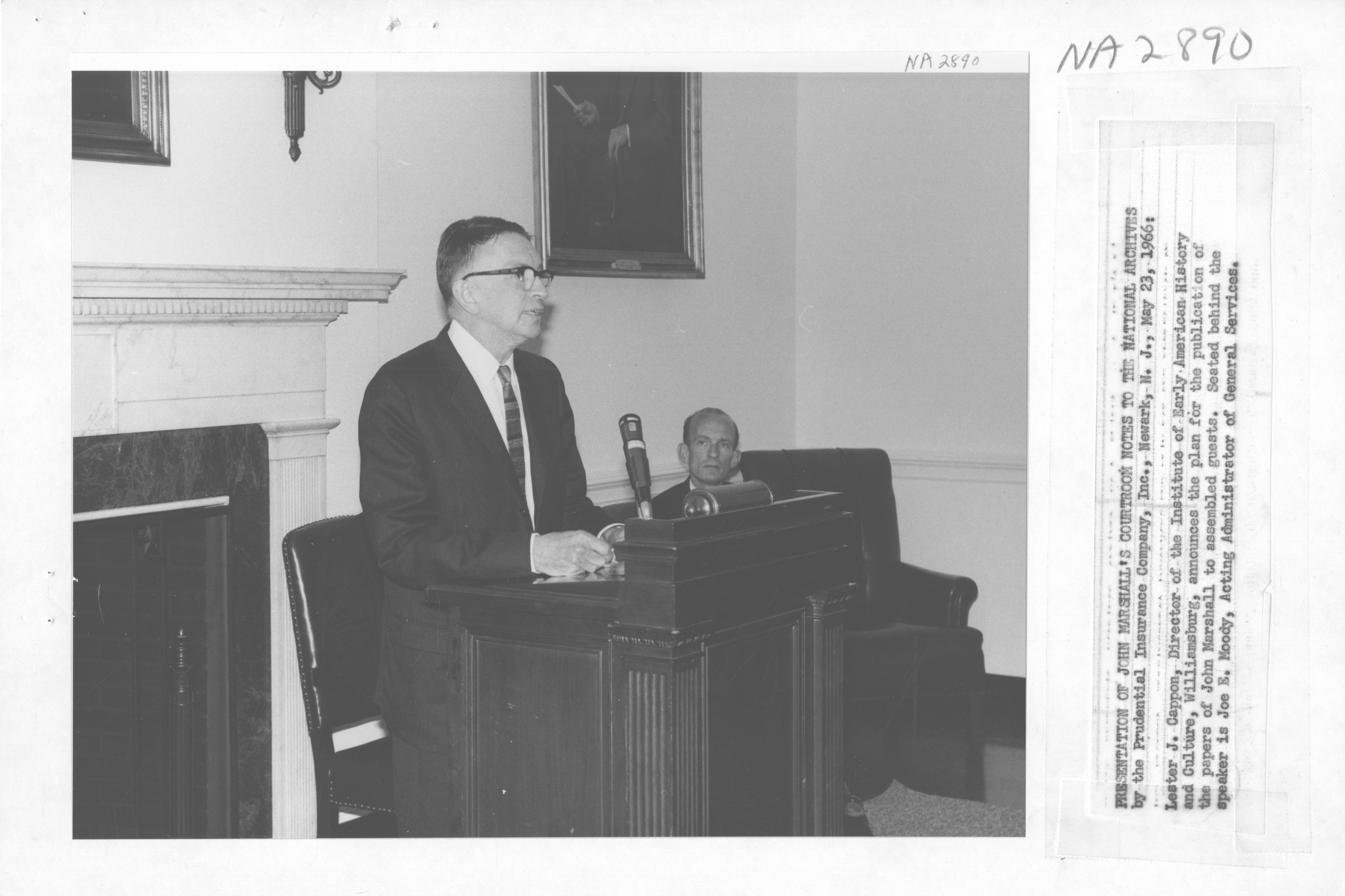
Lester Jesse Cappon

Lester Jesse Cappon (September 18, 1900 – August 24, 1981) was an American historian and documentary editor, and served as archivist for Colonial Williamsburg, Inc.

== Personal life ==
Cappon was born in Milwaukee, Wisconsin in 1900, the son of local businessman Jesse Cappon and his wife, Mary E. Geisinger Cappon. He graduated from the University of Wisconsin–Madison in 1922 where he was a member of Sigma Pi fraternity and Phi Beta Kappa. He later received his masters and doctoral (1928) degrees in history from Harvard University. He was married with two children and was a member of the Episcopal Church.

== Professional life ==
He began his career as a history professor and archivist at the University of Virginia, and later worked as an archivist at the College of William and Mary and for Colonial Williamsburg. While at William and Mary, he was the Director of the Institute of Early American History and Culture and editor of The William and Mary Quarterly.

Cappon wrote several books, including Virginia Newspapers 1821-1935 and The Bibliography of Virginia History Since 1865.

He was deeply involved professionally, and helped found the Society of American Archivists (SAA) and the Association for Documentary Editing (ADE). He served as president of the SAA from 1956 to 1957 and president of the ADE from 1979 to 1980.

At the end of his career, Cappon became a research fellow at the Newberry Library in Chicago. He died in Chicago on August 24, 1981.
