= John R. Saunders =

American politician

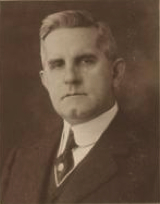

23rd Attorney General of Virginia
- In office February 1, 1918 – March 17, 1934
- Governor: Westmoreland Davis; Elbert Lee Trinkle; Harry F. Byrd; John Garland Pollard; George C. Peery
- Preceded by: Josiah D. Hank Jr.
- Succeeded by: Abram P. Staples

Member of the Virginia Senate from the 39th district
- In office January 8, 1908 – January 9, 1918
- Preceded by: J. Boyd Sears
- Succeeded by: J. Douglass Mitchell

Personal details
- Born: John Richard Saunders; December 9, 1869 King and Queen County, Virginia, U.S.
- Died: March 17, 1934 (aged 64) Saluda, Virginia, U.S.
- Party: Democratic
- Spouse: Blanche Hoskins

John Richard Saunders (December 9, 1869 – March 17, 1934) was an American lawyer and politician who served as Attorney General of Virginia from 1918 until his death in 1934. Prior to this, he was a member of the Senate of Virginia. He was a supporter of women's suffrage while in the Senate. He was married to Blanche Hoskins Saunders who was a member of the Equal Suffrage League of Saluda.

== Electoral history ==
Date	Election	Candidate	Party	Votes	%
Attorney General of Virginia
November 6, 1917	General	John R. Saunders	Democratic	-	-
November 6, 1917	General	Harry Wolcott	Republican	-	-
November 6, 1917	General	Josiah D. Hank, Jr. did not seek reelection; seat stayed Democratic			
November 8, 1921	General	John R. Saunders (inc.)	Democratic	-	-
November 8, 1921	General		Republican	-	-
November 5, 1929	General	John R. Saunders (inc.)	Democratic	183,793	63.73
November 5, 1929	General	Charles C. Berkeley	Republican	104,606	36.27
November 7, 1933	General	John R. Saunders (inc.)	Democratic	125,811	75.13
November 7, 1933	General	Clarence R. Ahalt	Republican	37,115	22.16
November 7, 1933	General	Herman R. Ansell	Socialist	4,526	2.70

Senate of Virginia
Preceded by J. Boyd Sears	Virginia Senator for the 39th District; 1908–1918	Succeeded by J. Douglass Mitchell
Legal offices
Preceded by Josiah D. Hank, Jr.	Attorney General of Virginia; 1918–1934	Succeeded by Abram P. Staples
