= Douglass Adair =

American historian (1912–1968)

- Born: Douglass Greybill Adair; March 5, 1912; New York City, U.S.
- Died: May 2, 1968 (aged 56)
- Education: Sewanee: The University of the South (BA); Harvard University (MA); Yale University (PhD)
- Occupation: Historian
- Spouse: Mary Virginia Hamilton

Douglass Greybill Adair (March 5, 1912 – May 2, 1968) was an American historian who specialized in intellectual history. He is best known for his work in researching the authorship of disputed numbers of The Federalist Papers, and his influential studies in the history and influence of republicanism in the United States during the late eighteenth and early nineteenth centuries—the era of the Enlightenment. His most famous essay, "Fame and the Founding Fathers," introduced the pursuit of fame as a new motivation for understanding the actions for the Framers.

== Early life and education ==
Douglass Greybill Adair was born in 1912 in New York City, but grew up with his family in Birmingham and Mobile, Alabama. He attended the University of the South in Tennessee, where he received his B.A. in English literature; he later earned his M.A. degree at Harvard University, and his Ph.D. degree at Yale University; he was awarded his doctorate in 1943 for his dissertation, The Intellectual Origins of Jeffersonian Democracy: Republicanism, the Class Struggle, and the Virtuous Farmer. This dissertation rejected the economic determinism associated with the highly influential historical work of Charles A. Beard; the dissertation's title responded directly to the title of Beard's 1915 book, The Economic Origins of Jeffersonian Democracy. Adair insisted that historical actors such as James Madison, John Adams, Thomas Jefferson, and Alexander Hamilton were guided by their education and creative interaction with ideas derived from the evolving Atlantic intellectual tradition. These ideas—particularly the cluster of ideas, assumptions, habits of thought, and interpretative principles known as republicanism—played a crucial role in the early development of the United States. Though the dissertation remained unpublished for decades, the list of those who borrowed it from Yale's library is described as a "who's who in early American history."

== Career ==
Adair taught at Princeton University, the College of William & Mary, and the Claremont Graduate School. From 1944 through 1955, Adair was the leading spirit in the launching, editing, and publication of the third series of the William and Mary Quarterly, which became the leading journal in the field of early American history. Adair contributed many influential articles to the Quarterly, including his classic two-part essay, "The Authorship of the Disputed Federalist Papers," and "The Tenth Federalist Revisited." He also wrote many book reviews, showing his mastery of the craft of reviewing and setting a standard for the field.

== Marriage and family ==
Adair married the poet Virginia Hamilton.

For an array of reasons, including depression associated with his inability to produce a full-length scholarly monograph in his field, Adair committed suicide in 1968.

== Legacy and honors ==
- In 1974, his friends prepared a volume collecting his essays, Fame and the Founding Fathers, which W. W. Norton published for the Institute of Early American History and Culture, with which Adair had been associated for so long. A trio of distinguished specialists in intellectual history framed the essays collected in that volume—the volume's editor, the historian Trevor Colbourn, wrote the introduction; Caroline Robbins, a leading historian of ideas, contributed a personal memoir of her friendship and intellectual collaboration with Adair; and Robert Shalhope presented an essay situating Adair in the historiography of the Revolution and the early Republic, with special reference to republicanism and what historians called the "republican synthesis." This volume was reprinted in 1998 by Liberty Fund and remains in print today.
- In 2000, Adair's dissertation was published as The Intellectual Origins of Jeffersonian Democracy: Republicanism, the Class Struggle, and the Virtuous Farmer, edited by Mark E. Yellin, with a foreword by Joyce O. Appleby.
