= George Preston Coleman =

American civil servant

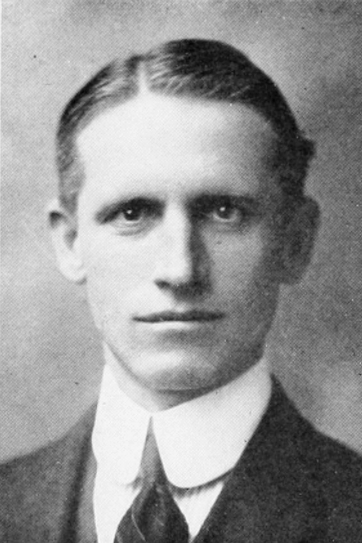

Mayor of Williamsburg, Virginia
- In office 1929–1934
- Preceded by: John G. Pollard
- Succeeded by: Channing M. Hall

Personal details
- Born: George Preston Coleman; May 4, 1870 Williamsburg, Virginia, U.S.
- Died: June 16, 1948 (aged 78) Williamsburg, Virginia, U.S.
- Spouse: Mary Haldane Begg

George Preston Coleman (May 4, 1870 – June 16, 1948) was the head of the Virginia Highway Commission from 1913 to 1922 and the mayor of Williamsburg, Va., from 1929 to 1934. The George P. Coleman Memorial Bridge that connects Yorktown and Gloucester Point is named after him. He is the grandson of Nathaniel Beverley Tucker and the great-grandson of St. George Tucker. The papers of the Tucker-Coleman family, including the papers of George Preston Coleman, are held by the Special Collections Research Center at the College of William & Mary.
