= William and Mary Quarterly =

Academic history journal

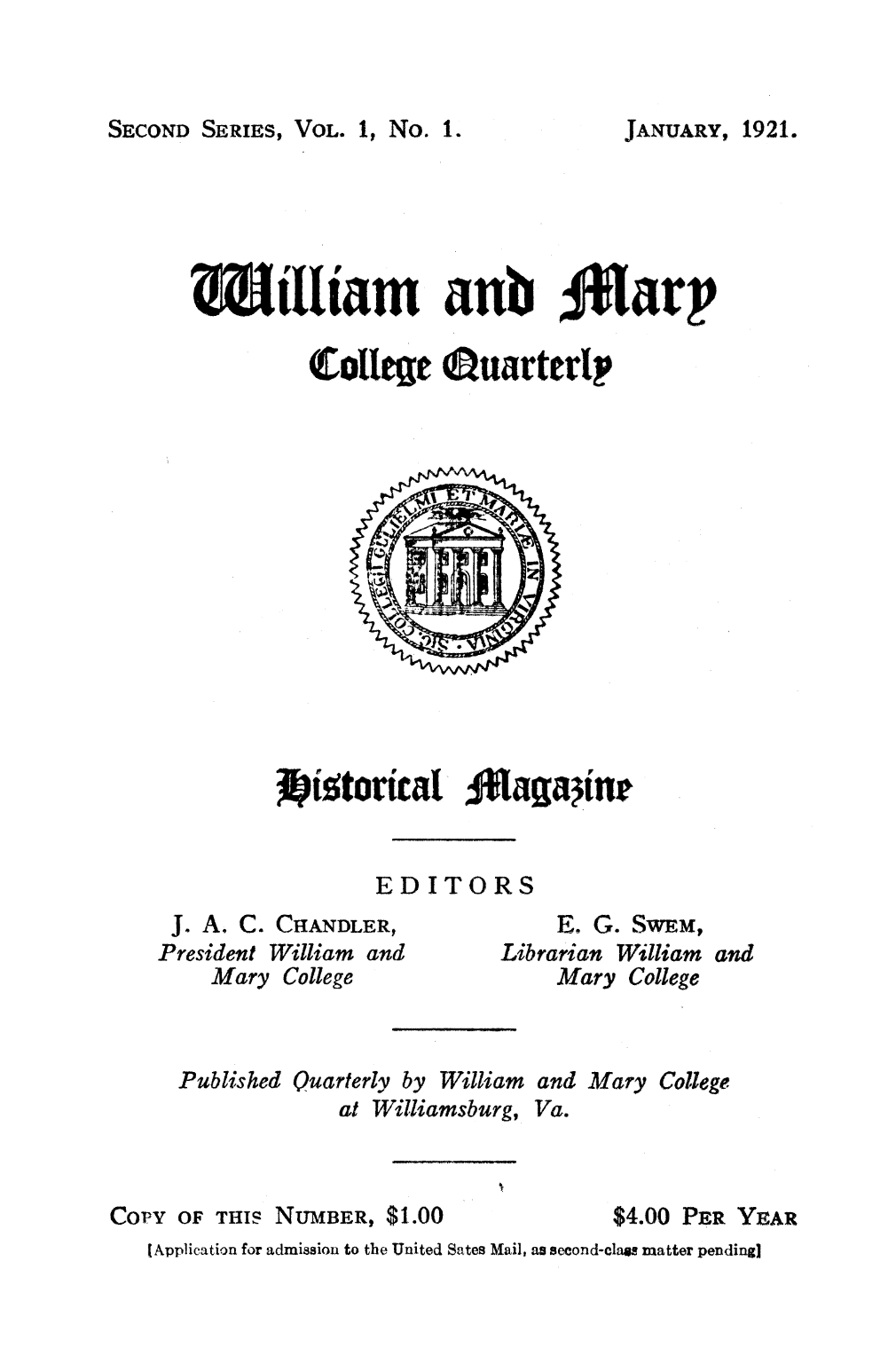
- Title page to the first issue of the second series, 1921
- Discipline: History
- Language: English
- Edited by: Julia Gaffield

Publication details
- Former names: The William and Mary College Quarterly Historical Papers; The William and Mary College Quarterly Historical Magazine
- History: Since 1892
- Publisher: Omohundro Institute of Early American History and Culture (United States)
- Frequency: Quarterly

Standard abbreviations
- ISO 4: William Mary Q.

Indexing
- ISSN: 0043-5597 (print); 1933-7698 (web)
- LCCN: 2004206523
- JSTOR: 00435597
- OCLC no.: 291100718

Links
- Journal homepage; Only table of contents; Online archive of tables of content

The William and Mary Quarterly is a quarterly peer-reviewed history journal published by the Omohundro Institute of Early American History and Culture that covers topics related to the Atlantic World – particularly North America – during the 15th through early 19th centuries. The journal was founded in 1892 by Lyon Gardiner Tyler to cover genealogical matters and Virginia history. It has gone through three series: the first from 1892 to 1919, the second from 1921 to 1943, and the third from 1944 to present. It is one of the oldest academic journals in the United States.

The journal was established as a private venture by Tyler and became part of the College of William & Mary in 1919. In 1944, it began publishing as part of the Institute of Early American History and Culture, an independent institution jointly sponsored by the college and the Colonial Williamsburg Foundation. Past editors of the William & Mary Quarterly have included J. A. C. Chandler, Earl Gregg Swem, Douglass Adair, and Lester J. Cappon. The present interim managing editor is Julia Gaffield.

== Content ==
The William and Mary Quarterly: A Magazine of Early American History and Culture is a double-blind peer-reviewed history journal that covers subjects related to early North American history, spanning from the 15th century to the early 19th century. The subjects covered in the journal can include topics related to the broader Atlantic World during the period. It is published by the Omohundro Institute of Early American History and Culture in Williamsburg, Virginia. The current interim editor is Julia Gaffield.

The William and Mary Quarterly receives about 125 manuscript submissions every year, of which approximately one in eight are accepted for publication following peer review. The current circulation of the William and Mary Quarterly is about 3,700, including both individuals and institutions, of which about a tenth are subscriptions outside the United States.

== History ==
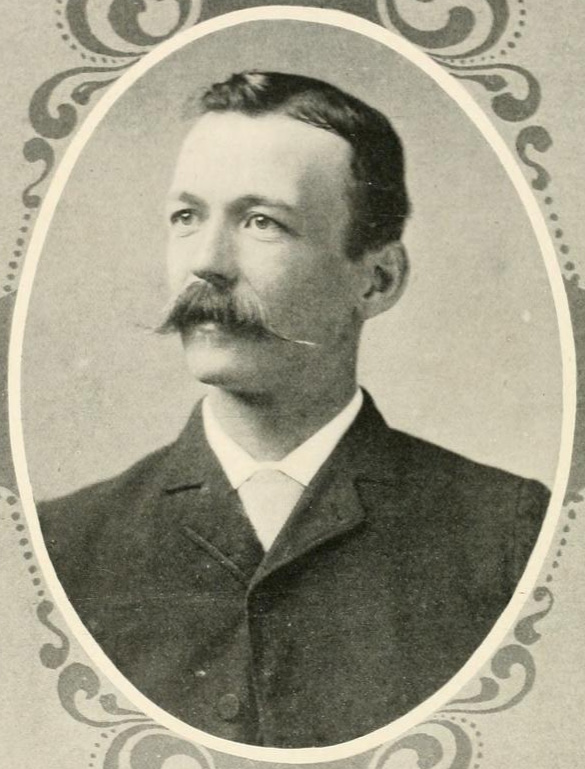
Lyon Gardiner Tyler (pictured in 1905) created The William and Mary College Quarterly Historical Papers in 1892.

Following the American Civil War, historians in Virginia were interested in elevating Virginia's role in American history. Among those who led this invigorated historical research was Lyon Gardiner Tyler, a son of US president John Tyler, who was an advocate of preserving Virginia's county and state documents. Tyler had encouraged the foundation of the Association for the Preservation of Virginia Antiquities (now Preservation Virginia) and would author several works on Virginia history over his lifetime.

What is now the William and Mary Quarterly was founded in 1892 by Tyler, making it one of the oldest academic journals in the United States. Tyler had become the president of the College of William & Mary in 1888. He had founded the journal under the name The William and Mary College Quarterly Historical Papers (renamed shortly afterwards to The William and Mary College Quarterly Historical Magazine) to record genealogical and Virginia historical topics. While Tyler had approached the college's board of visitors about the college funding his new journal, the journal began as a private enterprise funded by Tyler's own money when support from the board failed to materialize. Tyler served as the quarterly's editor.

During its first year, the quarterly cost $3 ($93.00 in 2024) per year, or 50¢ ($16.00 in 2024) per issue. The first issue of the quarterly began with an article on Masonic Lodge No. 6 in Williamsburg. This first issue received a positive review in the Norfolk Landmark, with the journal appraised at the end of its first volume as a "valuable magazine, especially to interest in Virginia history" by The State newspaper of Richmond. Within the quarterly, Tyler reported the death of his predecessor as college president, Benjamin Stoddert Ewell, in 1894.

The journal's first series ran from 1892 to 1919. The college became a state institution of Virginia in 1906. The journal became part of the College of William & Mary in 1919, and Tyler stepped down as the journal's chief editor that year. Tyler continued to publish his own journal from that year onward under the name Tyler's Quarterly Historical and Genealogical Magazine, and Tyler remained an editor of the journal until his death in 1935. These journals and Tyler's other works substantially contributed to the increased appreciation for the place of the Jamestown settlement in American history.

The William and Mary College Quarterly Historical Magazine began its second series in January 1921. At the outset of this series, its editors were Tyler's successor as William & Mary president, J. A. C. Chandler, and the William & Mary librarian Earl Gregg Swem. Despite only being able to offer small salaries, Chandler had convinced a number of successful scholars to join William & Mary's faculty. Swem was among them, and he had to come from the Library of Virginia in Richmond. The journal's second series continued to focus on Virginia state history and genealogy.

The Institute of Early American History and Culture was created in December 1943. The institute's establishment came as part of the then-college president John Edwin Pomfret's push for increased research activity by the college. Pomfret, himself a historian, secured support from Colonial Williamsburg and the Virginia General Assembly to assist the college in establishing the institute. With continued support from both the college and Colonial Williamsburg, the institute would function as an independent body. One of the roles the institute would take on was publication of the quarterly.

The journal launched its third series in January 1944. This third series adopted the name The William and Mary Quarterly: A Magazine of Early American History, Institutions, and Culture. Its scope was wider than that of the preceding series, now including US history from 1492 to 1815. From 1944 to 1947, the journal's managing editor was Richard Lee Morton, the chair of the history department at William & Mary. At the outset of the third series, the journal's editorial board included Swem, Pomfret, Thomas Perkins Abernethy, Randolph Greenfield Adams, Julian P. Boyd, Virginius Dabney, Leonard Woods Labaree, Samuel Eliot Morison, Stanley Pargellis, Arthur M. Schlesinger Sr., Louis Booker Wright, and Thomas J. Wertenbaker.

The third series received national attention and success for its skillful research, timely book reviews, and quality writing. In 1947, Morton was replaced as managing editor by Douglass Adair, an assistant professor of history at the college. William & Mary president Alvin Duke Chandler and Colonial Williamsburg president Kenneth Chorley requested that Schlesinger produce a report on the institute in 1954 and 1955. The report recommended that the college and Colonial Williamsburg issue the institute a charter or constitution and that the institute should prioritize publishing research. Before this report's recommendations could be acted on, Adair abruptly resigned.

Lester J. Cappon, an archivist at the college and a publication editor for the journal, assumed leadership of the institute and gave the managing editor position at the William and Mary Quarterly to Lawrence William Towner. The journal's positive reputation grew under the consecutive leadership of Adair and Towner. Benefitting from an increase of interest in American history following World War II, the William and Mary Quarterly's circulation grew from 1,100 in 1951 to 1,556 in 1960. Cappon would himself edit the paper from 1955 to 1956 and in 1963. Thad Tate, a Colonial Williamsburg researcher and William & Mary professor, would serve as one of the journal's editors from 1966 to 1972. In 1972, he became the director of the institute, which he led until his 1989 retirement.

In 1983, the William and Mary Quarterly had a circulation of 4,249, of which 1,547 were libraries or archives. The journal was one of the first 10 journals to be hosted by the online scholarly database JSTOR, with back content added in 2009.

== Prizes ==
The William and Mary Quarterly issues prizes to articles published within the journal. The Douglass Adair Memorial Award is awarded biennially to the best article from the preceding six years, while the Lester J. Cappon Award is awarded annually to the best article from the preceding year. The WMQ New Voices Prize is awarded to an article with an author who was in graduate research when they made the article's final submission. Established in 1986, the award was originally named the Richard L. Morton Award. The Mary Maples Dunn Prize is awarded to the best articles authored by an untenured professor writing on American woman's history.
