= J. Boyd Sears =

American politician

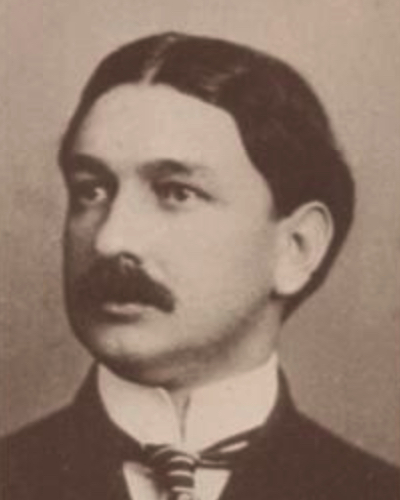

Member of the Virginia Senate from the 39th district
- In office December 4, 1901 – January 8, 1908
- Preceded by: Thomas E. Blakey
- Succeeded by: John R. Saunders

Personal details
- Born: John Boyd Sears; November 26, 1869
- Died: January 1, 1937 (aged 67)
- Party: Democratic

John Boyd Sears (November 26, 1869 – January 1, 1937) was an American politician who served as a member of the Virginia Senate.

Senate of Virginia
Preceded by Thomas E. Blakey	Virginia Senator for the 39th District; 1901–1908	Succeeded by John R. Saunders
