= Chandler Court and Pollard Park Historic District =

Historic neighborhood in Virginia, US

- U.S. National Register of Historic Places
- U.S. Historic district
- Virginia Landmarks Register
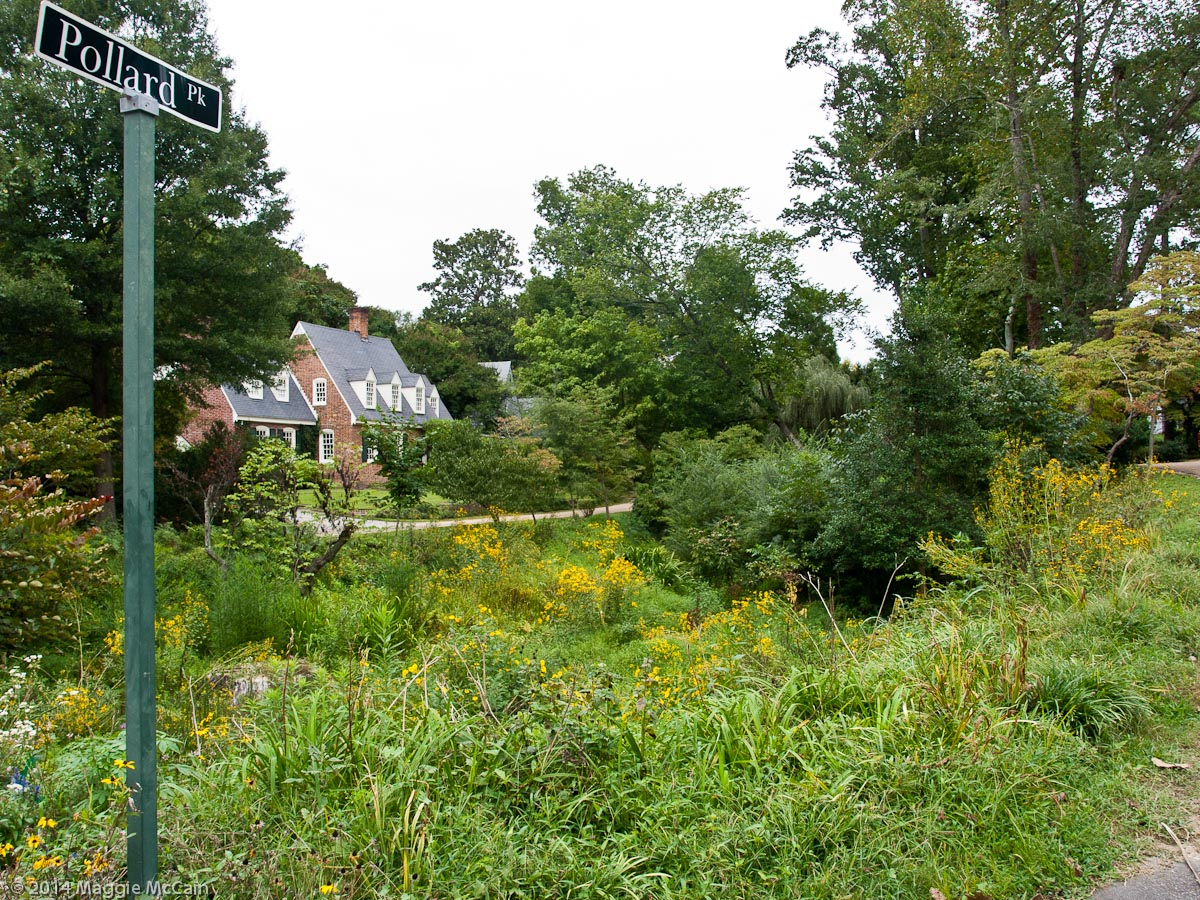
- Pollard Park

- Location within Virginia Location within the United States
- Location: Roughly bounded by Jamestown Rd., Griffin Ave., Pollard Park, and College of William and Mary Maintenance Yard, Williamsburg, Virginia
- Coordinates: 37°16′4″N 76°42′36″W
- Area: 7 acres (2.8 ha)
- Built: 1922
- Architect: multiple
- Architectural style: Colonial Revival, Dutch Colonial Revival, Georgian Revival
- NRHP reference No.: 96001075
- VLR No.: 137-0478

Significant dates
- Added to NRHP: October 3, 1996
- Designated VLR: March 20, 1996

The Chandler Court and Pollard Park Historic District is a pair of neighborhoods that form a national historic district located at Williamsburg, Virginia, United States. Mostly developed between 1922 and 1940, the neighborhoods reflect the evolution of middle-class suburban housing during that period. The houses represent a variety of interpretations of Colonial Revival styles, including Dutch Colonial Revival and Georgian Revival. The houses of Chandler Court more freely interpret historical precedents, while Pollard Park reflects the restoration of Colonial Williamsburg in more closely mirroring historical examples.

The neighborhoods were initially planned by John Garland Pollard, a professor at the College of William & Mary who would later become the mayor of Williamsburg and then the governor of Virginia. Chandler Court was initially laid out between 1922 and 1924, while Pollard Park was laid out in 1930. Envisioned garden suburbs, the neighborhoods have housed several notable figures associated with the college, including the librarian Earl Gregg Swem, the historian Richard Lee Morton, and Pollard himself. Besides Pollard, several architects were involved in designing houses in the neighborhood, including the college's chief architectural planner, Charles M. Robinson.

The district was listed on the National Register of Historic Places (NRHP) in 1996. In 1996, the listing included 25 contributing buildings, two contributing sites, and one contributing structure deemed to contribute to the historic character of the area. Two additional structures, initially considered non-contributing to the historic district, were reassessed as contributing structures in 2020. In the same update to the NRHP, the district's period of historic importance – previously 1922 to 1940 – was expanded to 1968.

== Description ==
Chandler Court and Pollard Park are a pair of neighborhoods in the city of Williamsburg, Virginia, United States, with a total area of 7 acres (2.8 ha). Since 1996, the neighborhoods have been listed as a historic district on the National Register of Historic Places (NRHP). Constructed south of Jamestown Road across from the College of William & Mary, the neighborhood was designed to serve as garden suburb housing faculty and students from the college. The architectural historian Richard Guy Wilson called Chandler Court and Pollard Park "two of Williamsburg's most appealing twentieth-century neighborhoods".

The houses in both neighborhoods are mostly small- and medium-size middle-class residences that reflect influence from historical precedents, falling broadly within the Colonial Revival style despite variance in interpretation and proximity to historical modes. While most of the buildings were originally constructed for homeowners, some were built as rentals or later modified to possess apartments to accommodate lodgers affiliated with the college.

The topography of the neighborhoods spurred the construction of landscaping elements including public brick and stone pathways. Vegetation, both naturally occurring and within home gardens, spans the neighborhoods. Chandler Court has a shared ovoid green that is the focus of that development and where its two lanes meet. This flat lawn was inspired by larger village greens present in England and New England. The Chandler Court development is connected to the Pollard Park development by Ballard Lane and paths that descend south a hillside, which include a sloping private lawn traversed by a publicly accessible brick path. Pollard Park's lane loops a deep, forested ravine, reflecting interwar trends incorporating natural landscaping.

The college professor and politician John Garland Pollard laid out both neighborhoods and assisted in designing some of their houses. Other architects involved in designing the neighborhoods' houses included the Virginians Charles M. Robinson – then the chief architectural planner for the college – Clarence Wright Huff Jr., and Thomas T. Waterman, as well as the South Carolinian Eimer Cappelmam. Among the college faculty and staff of the college who lived in the neighborhoods were the dean Grace Landrum, the history professor Richard L. Morton, and the librarian Earl Gregg Swem; these three each had a building on the campus of the College of William & Mary named for them.

The historic district incorporates 30 resources: 27 buildings, two sites, and a structure are considered contributing to district. This includes 27 residential structures – two of which were initially not included as contributing when the district was listed on the NRHP – the Court in Chandler Court, the Park in Pollard Park, and the brick entrance gate to Chandler Court. The house at 605 Wythe Lane was initially considered non-contributing to the historic district. It was demolished c. 2016, with the house erected on the same site in c. 2017 still considered non-contributing.

The houses of the Chandler Court neighborhood are located along Chandler Court, Wythe Lane, and Griffin Avenue. The earlier of the historic district's two neighborhoods, these houses freely interpret Colonial American architecture that is broadly Colonial Revival but varies substantially between the structures: Dutch Colonial Revival architecture is evident in 101, 121, 123, and 131 Chandler Court and 207 Griffin Avenue, while late Colonial Virginia styling is present in 129 Chandler Court. Waterman designed 140 Chandler Court. Williamsburg Presbyterian Church built its manse at 601 Wythe Lane.

The design of 123 Chandler Court reflects how the development's houses evolved from design to construction. The initial designed for the house was created by Robinson for the college professor Josef Roy Geiger. Robinson's design planned a two-story frame house in an early American neoclassical styling. Geiger believed building this design would be too expensive, so he sought help from the contractor E. T. Davis. The completed Davis design incorporated the Robinson plan's room arrangements and detailing of the stairs but otherwise largely deviated from the initial design. Despite the one and a half-story house being completed in brick and lacking several of the original plan's rooms, the styling suggests that both Geiger and Davis drew upon Robinson's work in completing the house.

The houses of the Pollard Park neighborhood on Pollard Park and Ballard Lane reflect influence from the contemporaneous restoration of Colonial Williamsburg, with the houses of the neighborhood following patterns of 18th-century Chesapeake styling. Huff designed 604 and 608 Pollard Park. Waterman designed 601 Pollard Park, which was built as a rental property for the Mortons, who lived in Chandler Court.

== History ==
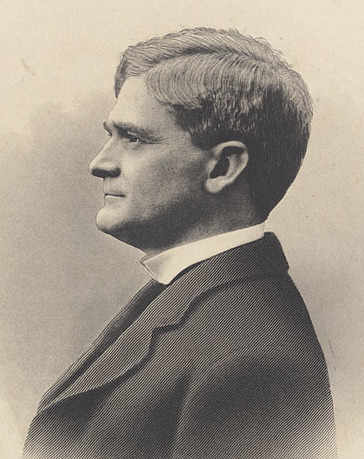
John Garland Pollard was responsible for planning the neighborhoods and was closely involved in their development.

In 1880, A. M. Matics bought a 20-acre (8.1 ha) tract south of the College of William & Mary known as The Oaks from the estate of William A. Durfey for $610 ($17,000 in 2024). This land was then sold for $650 ($20,000 in 2024) to Horatio N. Bucktrout in 1886. An 18-acre (7.3 ha) tract adjacent to this property to the south was sold from Margaret Brooks to Bucktrout for $300 ($9,000 in 2024) in 1901. The Texan C. J. Callahan purchased 33.3 acres (13.5 ha) of the combined properties with the intention of using it for speculation and development. His Callahan Development Company divided the lots into a grid pattern of plots measuring 25 ft (7.6 m) by 100 ft (30 m). However, his plots did not account for the unsuitable land away from the frontage roads, including the ravine; these plots were largely purchased as speculative properties by non-Williamsburg residents, many of whom failed to pay property taxes.

Callahan failed to pay anything towards the $11,000 ($177,000 in 2024) note registered against the properties and defaulted on his mortgage in 1917. In January 1918, Bucktrout reacquired the lots Callahan had not yet sold on the courthouse for $1,250 ($17,000 in 2024). Those lots which Callahan had sold and Bucktrout was unable to reacquire were primarily along what is now Jamestown Road (then considered Duke of Gloucester Street), Griffin Avenue (then Texas Avenue), and Wythe Lane (then Richmond Avenue).

In 1922, John Garland Pollard moved to Williamsburg to become a professor at the college to teach constitutional law and history. A lifelong Virginian, Pollard was the descendent of politically and religiously influential families in the state. The college president, J. A. C. Chandler, determined that Pollard's capacity for leadership made him a suitable candidate to lead the newly founded Marshall-Wythe School of Government and Citizenship, William & Mary's law school, from 1923 until Pollard became Virginia's governor in 1929. Upon arriving in Williamsburg, Pollard rented a house along Jamestown Road that was adjacent to the Bucktrout land.

Pollard, who was familiar with how to design developments and had sufficient wealth to pursue such a venture, conceived the idea for a new neighborhood south of the college. In May 1922, Pollard purchased the land east of Griffin Avenue and south to the ravine from Bucktrout for $5,000 ($73,000 in 2024). Later in May and into July, Pollard purchased the house he was renting and most of the lots not that had not come back into Bucktrout's possession from their individual owners. Pollard acquired the title for the final three plots for his development in March 1925, though he had paid for them in 1922. Those lots that he had failed to purchase were two from Block 2 and ten lots along Jamestown Road.

For his development, Pollard rejected the grid pattern and instituted his own design to conform to the terrain. Chandler Court was introduced as a diagonally aligned access road connecting what is now Wythe Lane with Jamestown Road. The Chandler Court road was made to pass through Wythe Lane and horseshoe back, creating a cul-de-sac with a public lawn in the middle and five houses ringing it. Multiple curving brick paths were to provide walking access and to mark property lines, with construction intended to occur near the paths to provide areas with unobstructed views. Pollards plan was accepted by the city of Williamsburg in January 1924, and the city annexed the development. Pollard Park would follow the same principles established for Chandler Court, with its plan of development approved in 1930.

Pollard was closely involved in the development of the neighborhoods. He moved into a newly constructed house on Chandler Court in February 1924 and built an office down the hill. He recruited the neighborhoods' first residents – primarily but not exclusively college faculty – and assisted in designing, financing, and insuring their houses. Once he became mayor of Williamsburg, Pollard collaborated with the restoration of Colonial Williamsburg that commenced in 1927 under W. A. R. Goodwin and John D. Rockefeller Jr. As part of his effort to restore Williamsburg's historic character, Pollard helped change the names of the streets in his neighborhoods from Texas and Richmond Avenues to Griffin Avenue and Wythe Lane, respectively.

Among the residents of Chandler Court were Richard L. Morton, Earl Gregg Swem, and their respective wives. The Mortons' and Swems' houses were located across from one another, at 116 and 119 Chandler Court, respectively. Though Morton and Swem had substantially different political perspectives, the two were respectful towards one another as neighbors.

In 1991, the city of Williamsburg created the Architectural Preservation District, then encompassing approximately 750 buildings of historic importance. These buildings included colonial-era buildings in Colonial Williamsburg as well as the Merchants Square shopping area and several neighborhoods, including Chandler Court and Pollard Park.
