= Josiah D. Hank Jr. =

American politician

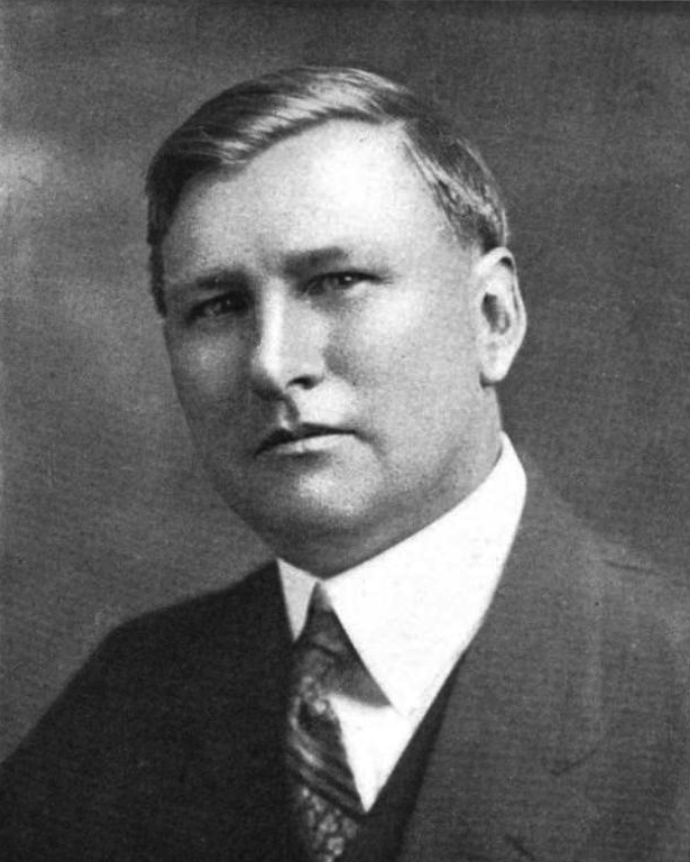

22nd Attorney General of Virginia
- In office January 5, 1918 – February 1, 1918
- Governor: Henry Carter Stuart
- Preceded by: John Garland Pollard
- Succeeded by: John R. Saunders

Personal details
- Born: Josiah Dickenson Hank Jr. April 19, 1875 Saluda, Virginia, U.S.
- Died: July 29, 1924 (aged 49) Richmond, Virginia, U.S.
- Party: Democratic
- Spouse: Emma McAuley Pelham
- Education: Randolph–Macon College; University of Virginia

Josiah Dickenson Hank Jr. (April 19, 1875 – July 29, 1924) was an American attorney and politician. Appointed assistant Attorney General of Virginia in August 1917, he served as Attorney General after John Garland Pollard resigned the following year.

== Early life and education ==
The son of Rev. Josiah Dickenson Hank, a Methodist minister, and his wife Laura Wailes, daughter of a Maryland physician, was born in Saluda, Virginia He had at least three brothers, one also a lawyer. Educated in private schools in Salisbury, Maryland, he returned to Virginia and received degrees from Randolph-Macon College and the University of Virginia School of Law. His uncle served as chief of staff for Confederate General Joseph Wheeler, and his wife's grandfather was Confederate Major John Pelham.

== Career ==
He taught Greek and English from 1895 until 1899, then from 1901 until 1903 edited legal texts for the Michie Company, until beginning a private legal practice in Norfolk, Virginia. In 1907 he published Hank's Annotations. In August 1917 he accepted an appointment as Assistant Attorney General, and briefly served as Attorney General when John Garland Pollard resigned to campaign for governor.
