= Grace Phillips Pollard =

First Lady of Virginia

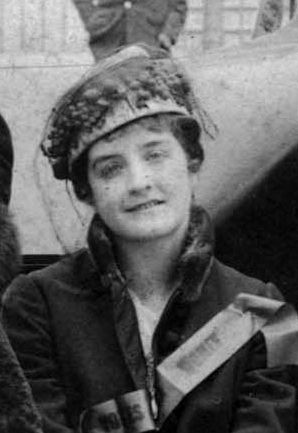
- Photograph of Phillips circa 1915

First Lady of Virginia
- In role January 15, 1930 – May 4, 1932
- Preceded by: Anne Byrd
- Succeeded by: Violet E. MacDougall

Personal details
- Born: Grace Hawthorne Phillips; 1873 Portsmouth, Virginia, U.S.
- Died: May 4, 1932 (aged 58–59) Richmond, Virginia, U.S.
- Spouse: John Garland Pollard
- Children: 4

Grace Hawthorne Pollard (née Phillips; 1873 – May 4, 1932) was an American suffragist who was the first lady of Virginia from 1930 to 1932 as the first wife of John Garland Pollard. She is the only First Lady of Virginia to have died while in the role.

== Early life and family ==
Pollard was born in 1873, the daughter of Charles T. Phillips (a Sergeant Major in the 9th Virginia Infantry) and Mary Hickman. She was raised in Portsmouth, Virginia.

In August 1898, she married John Garland Pollard. They had one child who died in infancy and three children who lived into adulthood, including:

- Dr. John Garland Pollard Jr. (1901–1995), president of the Virginia Museum of Fine Arts, chairman of the Lancaster County School Board
- Charles Phillips Pollard (1903–1990)
- Suzanne Pollard Boatwright (1906–1977)

== Public life ==
=== Women's suffrage ===
In the 1910s Pollard became active in the women's suffrage movement in the United States, and was a member of the Equal Suffrage League of Virginia. She was part of a committee to promote the viewing of the film Your Girl and Mine, a 1914 film promoting woman's suffrage. Virginia women won the right to vote in August 1920 when the Nineteenth Amendment became law and would go on to vote in the presidential election that following November.

=== First lady ===
Pollard became First Lady of Virginia in 1930. As first lady, she was involved in historical preservation and horticultural beautification pursuits. She supervised the planting of dogwoods and boxwoods on the grounds of the Virginia State Capitol and the Executive Mansion. She was also a collector of fine art, including a sculpture by Attilio Piccirilli. Pollard suffered from severe arthritis and used a wheelchair by the time she was first lady.

== Death ==
Pollard died at the Executive Mansion in 1932, aged 58 or 59. She is buried in her family plot in Cedar Grove Cemetery in Portsmouth. After her death, the Virginia General Assembly passed a bipartisan joint resolution in remembrance of her and in honor of her service as the first lady of Virginia. Because of Pollard's work, dogwoods now line Virginia's highways.
