= Virginia Hamilton Adair =

American poet (1913–2004)

- Born: Mary Virginia Hamilton; February 28, 1913 New York City, U.S.
- Died: September 16, 2004 (aged 91) Claremont, California, U.S.
- Occupation: Poet
- Education: Montclair Kimberley Academy; Mount Holyoke College (BA); Radcliffe College (MA)
- Spouse: Douglass Adair

Virginia Hamilton Adair (February 28, 1913, New York City – September 16, 2004, Claremont, California) was an American poet who became famous later in life with the 1996 publication of Ants on the Melon.

== Background ==
Mary Virginia Hamilton was born in the Bronx and raised in Montclair, New Jersey. She attended Montclair Kimberley Academy, graduating in the class of 1929. She disliked the name "Mary" and dropped it as a young adult. Adair composed her first poem at the age of two; after that, she wrote over a thousand poems. Exposed to poetry as a young child through her father, she began writing her own poems regularly at age six. More than seventy were published in journals and major magazines, such as the Atlantic and the New Yorker.

She received her B.A. in English from Mount Holyoke College in 1933 and her M.A. from Radcliffe College. Later she was professor emerita at California State Polytechnic University, Pomona, in Pomona, California, where she taught from 1957 to 1980.

== Career ==
Though she published work during the 1930s and 1940s in Saturday Review, The Atlantic, and The New Republic, Adair did not publish again for almost 50 years. There were several factors which preoccupied her over those decades and took her attention away from publishing her own work. These included her 1936 marriage to prominent historian Douglass Adair, motherhood (she had three children), and an academic career. She was also soured on publishing her work due to her distaste for the gamesmanship of the publishing world.

Adair's return to publishing came in the 1990s, following her husband's 1968 suicide, her retirement from teaching, and her loss of sight from glaucoma. Adair's friend and fellow poet Robert Mezey forwarded some of her work to Alice Quinn, The New Yorker's poetry editor. The New Yorker published the work in 1995, and the subsequently published "Ants on the Melon". Adair's work then appeared regularly in The New Yorker and The New York Review of Books.

== Works ==
- Beliefs and Blasphemies
- Ants on the Melon
