= George P. Coleman Memorial Bridge =

Bridge across York River in Virginia

Coleman Bridge
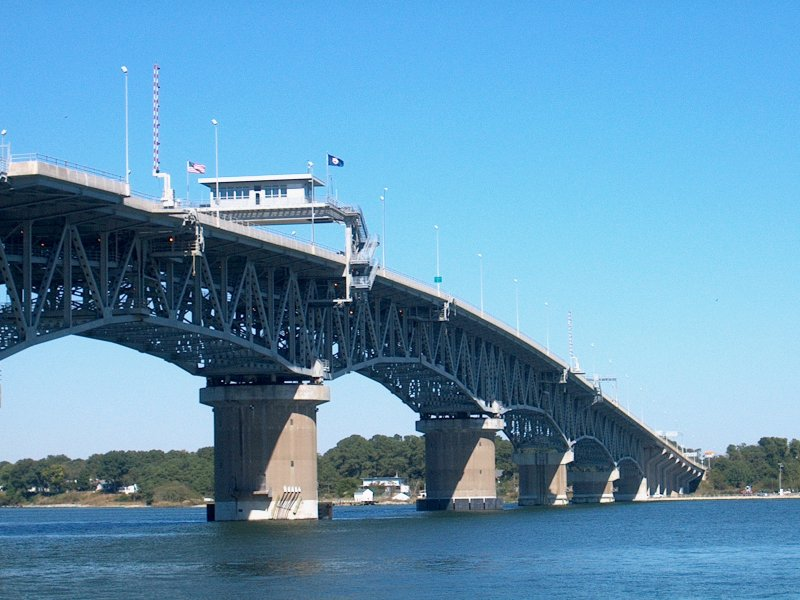
- The Coleman Bridge as seen from Yorktown as it connects with Gloucester Point.
- Coordinates: 37.2426°N 76.5070°W
- Carries: 4 lanes of US 17
- Crosses: York River
- Locale: Gloucester Point and Yorktown, Virginia
- Official name: George P. Coleman Memorial Bridge
- Maintained by: Virginia Department of Transportation
- ID number: 000000000019824

Characteristics
- Design: Swing bridge, with two swinging spans
- Material: High-strength steel
- Total length: 3,750 feet (1,140 m)
- Longest span: 450 feet (140 m)
- Clearance below: 60 feet (18 m)

History
- Designer: Parsons Brinckerhoff
- Opened: May 7, 1952; rebuilt in spring 1995

Statistics
- Daily traffic: 33,595 (2005)

The George P. Coleman Memorial Bridge (known locally as simply the Coleman Bridge) is a double swing bridge that spans the York River between Yorktown and Gloucester Point, in the United States state of Virginia. It connects the Peninsula and Middle Peninsula regions of Tidewater, Virginia. The bridge is the only public crossing of the York River, though State Route 33 crosses both of its tributaries (the Mattaponi and Pamunkey Rivers) just upriver of their confluence at West Point.

== History ==
Originally built in 1952, it was reconstructed and widened in 1995 through an unusual process which greatly reduced the time the important commuter artery was out-of-service from conventional methods. The current 3,750-foot (1,140 m)-long double-swing-span bridge carries United States Route 17, a four-lane arterial highway. The movable span is needed to allow ship access to several military installations that are upstream of the bridge, most notably, the United States Navy's Naval Weapons Station Yorktown. The roadways are almost 90 feet (27 m) above the river at the highest point of the bridge. The bridge is the largest double-swing-span bridge in the United States, and second largest in the world.

The bridge was named for George P. Coleman, who from 1913 to 1922 was the head of the Virginia Department of Highways and Transportation, predecessor to the Virginia Department of Transportation (VDOT). The bridge has been one of the sites of a special program to establish and encourage nesting locations for the peregrine falcon population of Virginia.

The George P. Coleman Memorial Bridge operated as a toll bridge from 1952 until 1976, when the original bonds were paid off. After the bridge was rebuilt, tolls were added again from 1995 until 8:00 PM on Friday August 8th, 2025. Following a brief closure, the bridge reopened free to all traffic.

== Photos ==
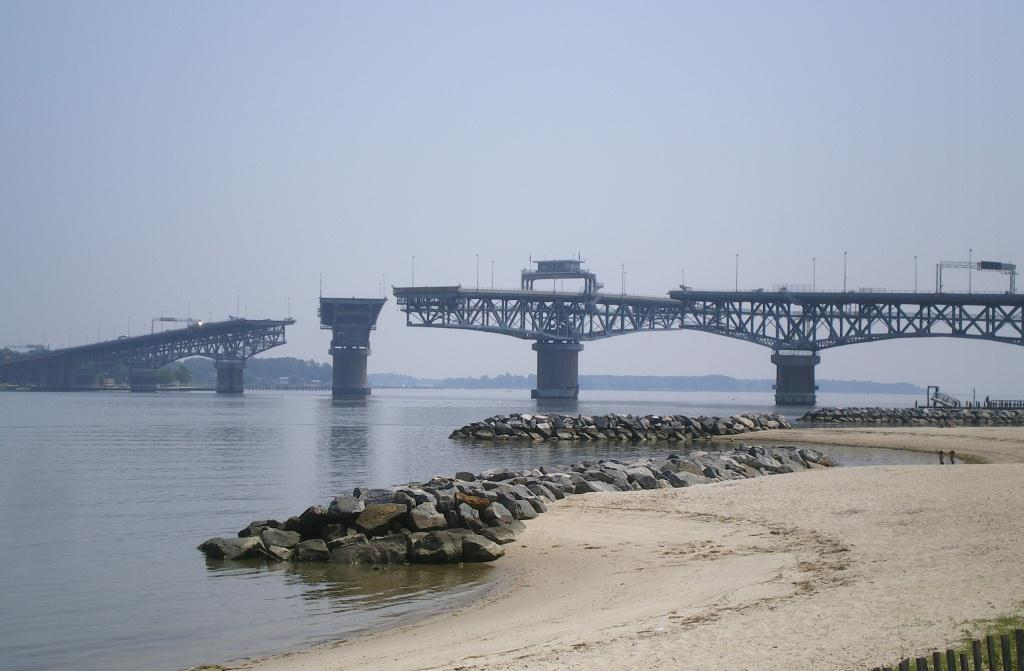
Bridge swung open as seen from Yorktown side, Summer 2011

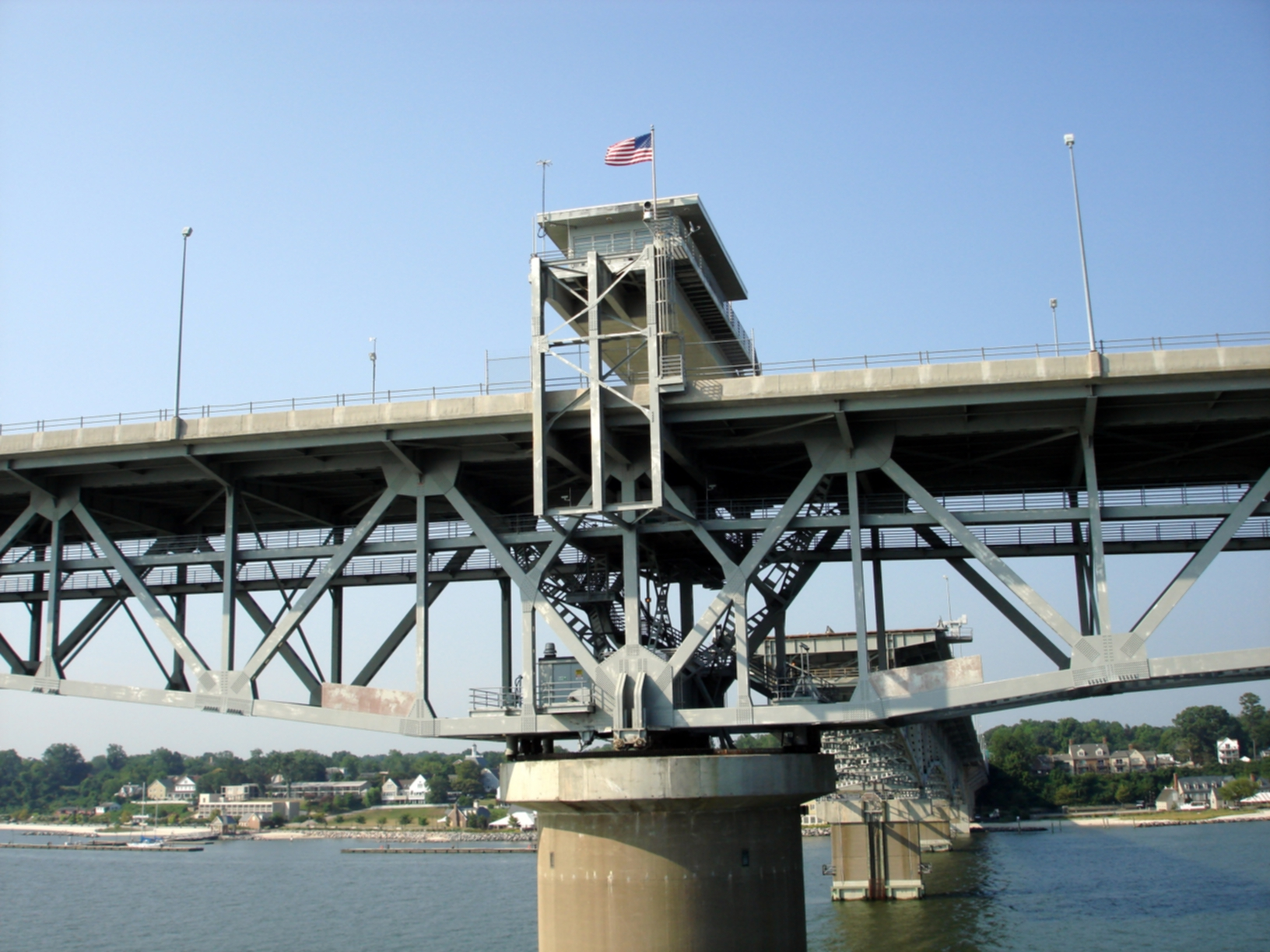
One of the two swing spans while fully turned (open for river traffic)

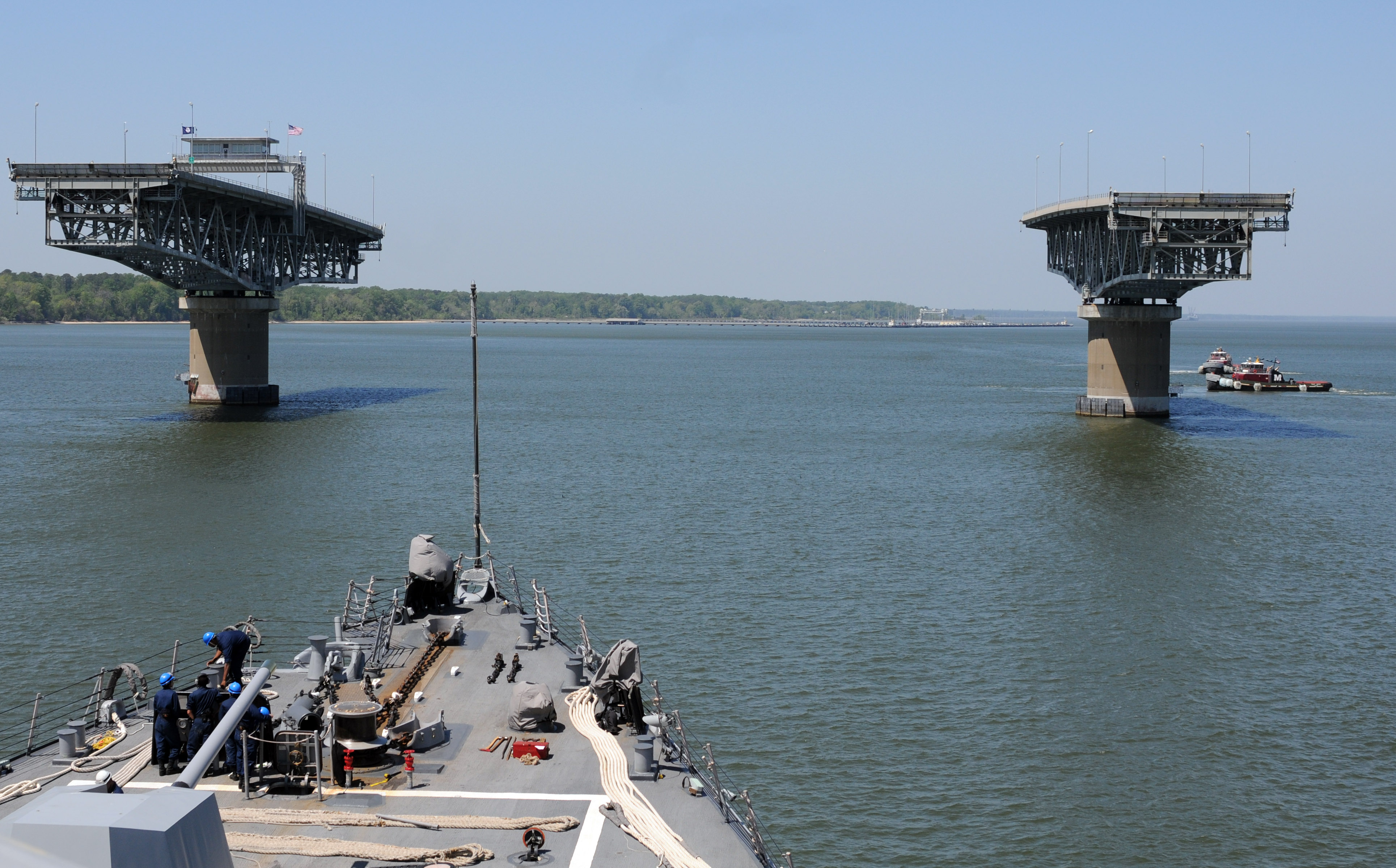
Opened bridge as seen from aboard a Navy ship

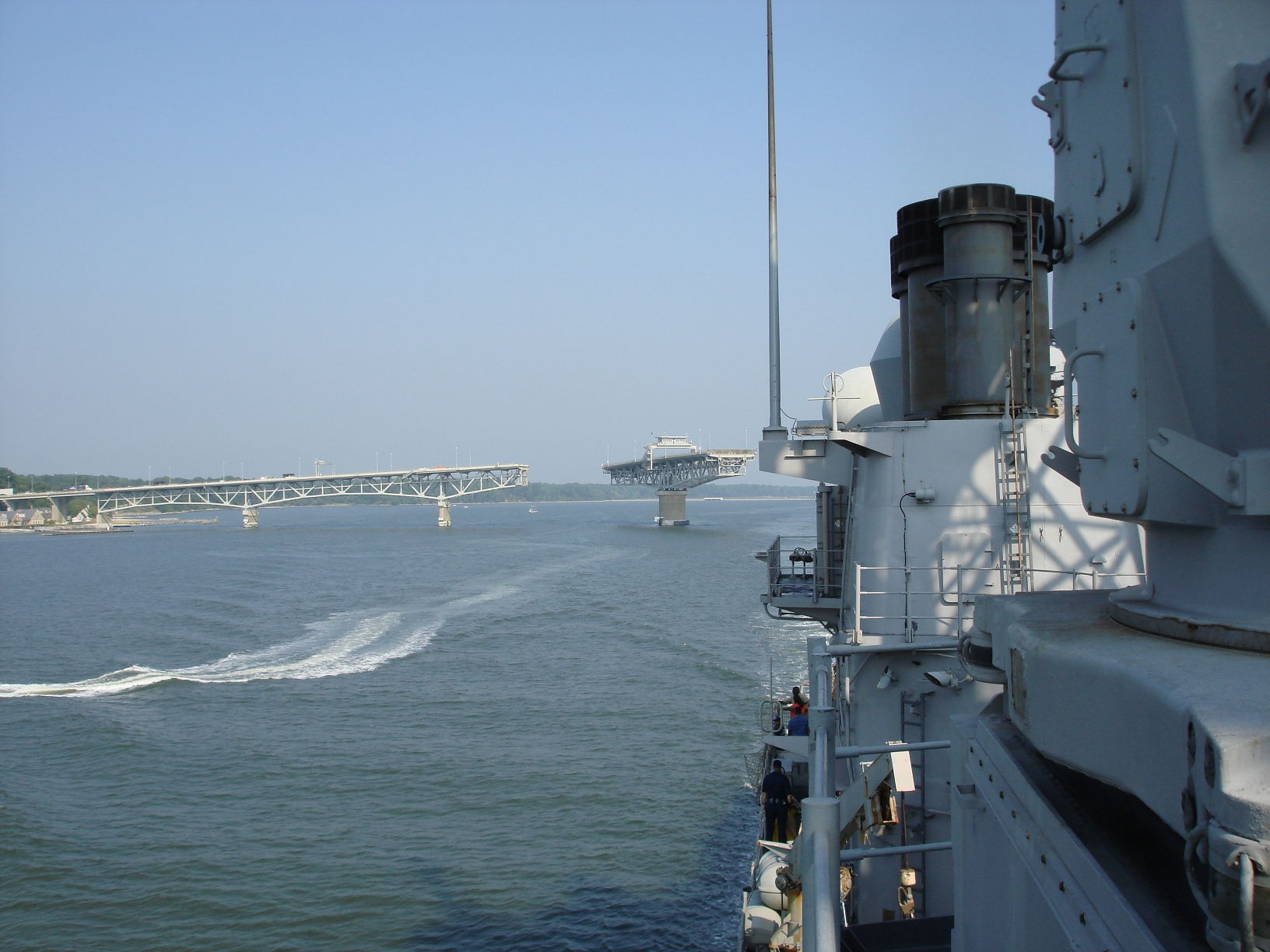
Bridge swinging closed as seen from down York River

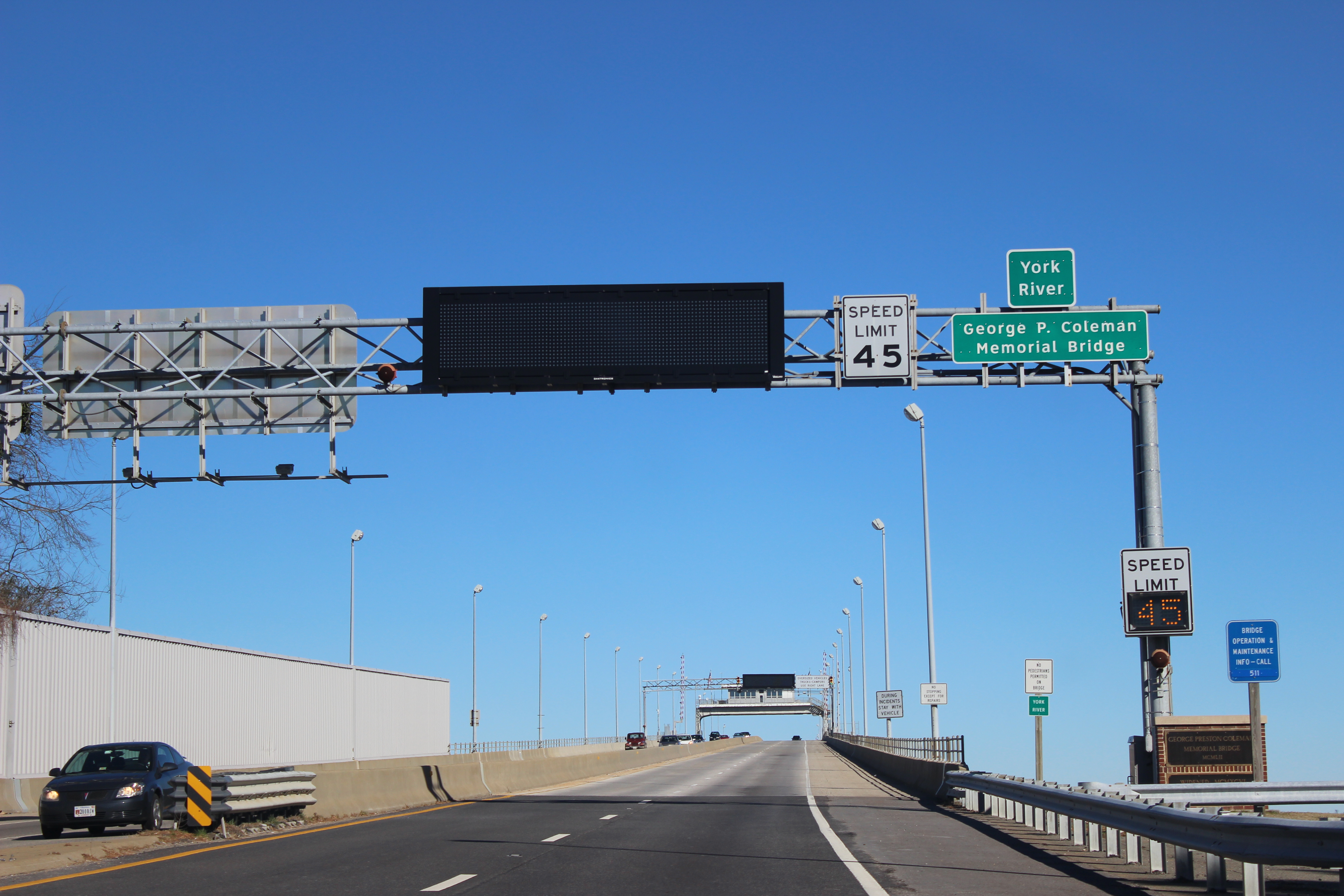
Entering Bridge from Yorktown side

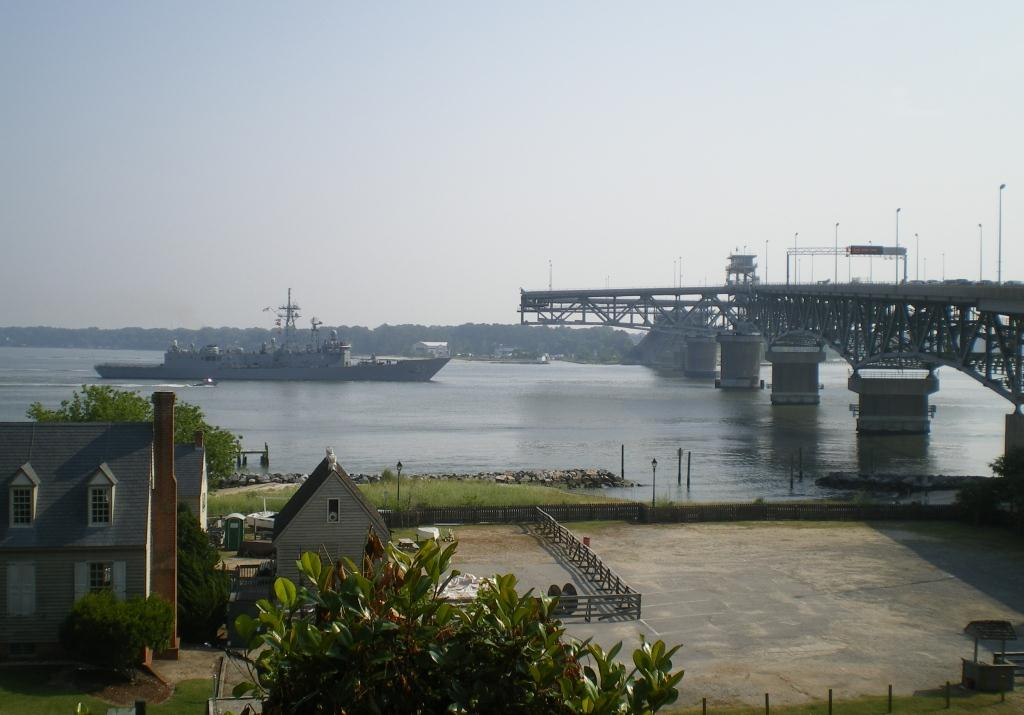
USS Elrod (FFG-55) about to pass through the George P. Coleman Memorial Bridge on the York River, Summer 2011

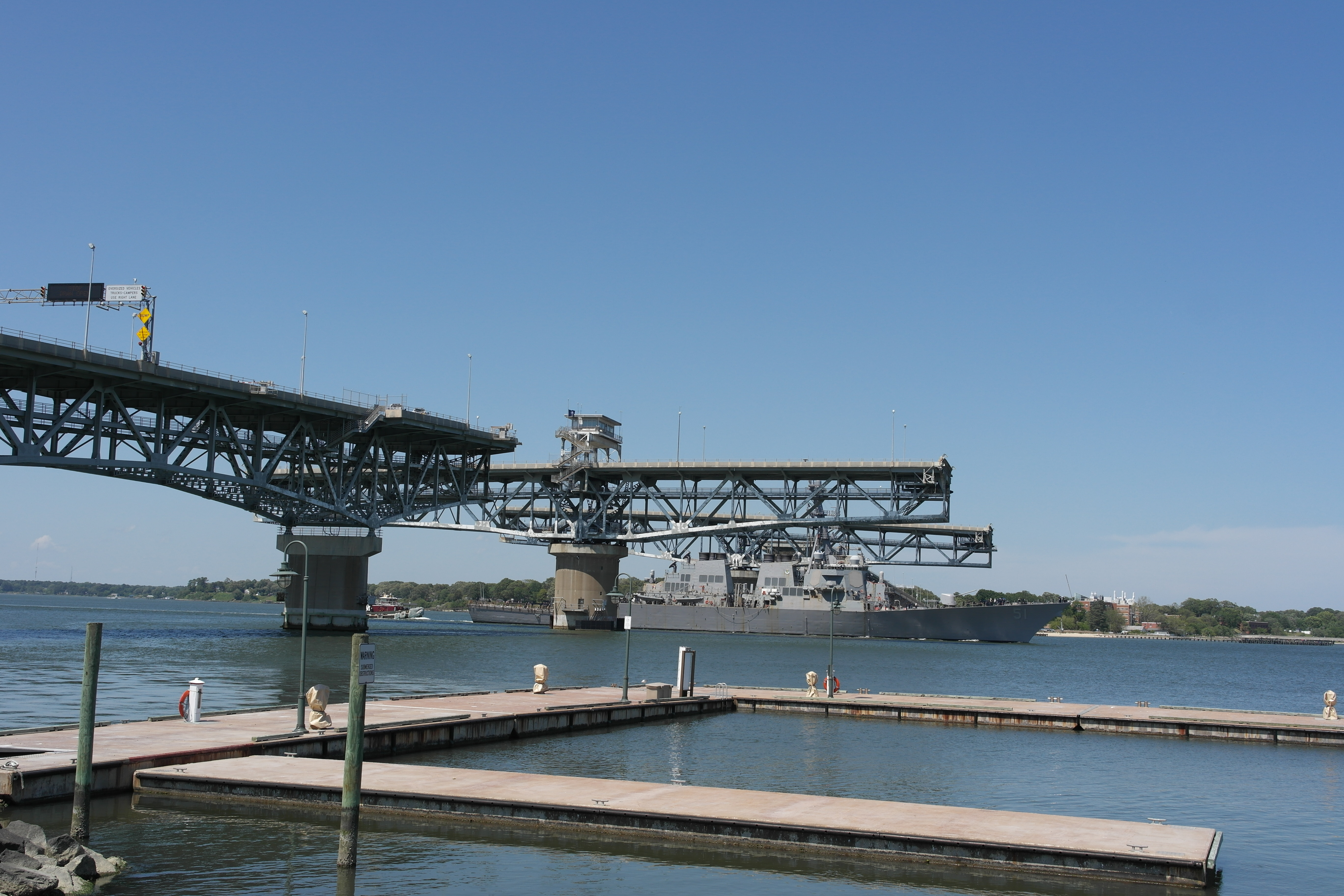
USS Arleigh Burke traveling under the bridge.

== See also ==
- List of bridges documented by the Historic American Engineering Record in Virginia
