= Earl Gregg Swem =

American historian and librarian

- Born: December 29, 1870; Cedar Rapids, Iowa
- Died: April 14, 1965 (aged 94); Louisville, Kentucky
- Occupation: Librarian
- Awards: Fellow of the American Society of Genealogists

Earl Gregg Swem (December 29, 1870 – April 14, 1965) was an American historian, bibliographer and librarian. Swem worked at the Library of Congress and Virginia State Library, and for more than two decades was primary librarian at the College of William & Mary, where the Earl Gregg Swem Library (in construction during his final years) was named in his honor.

== Early and family life ==
Swem was born in Cedar Rapids, Iowa. His father Edward Lawrence Swem (1838–1918) (a gallery owner in Belle Plaine and later Cedar Rapids), was born in Indiana. His mother, the former Emeline Luse, was born in Ohio. Their family included at least two girls and two boys. His middle name reflects Quaker Asa Gregg (1806–1896), one of the first settlers in Muscatine County, Iowa and who wrote about the county's history. Whilst attending the local high school, young Earl began working at the Iowa Masonic Library. He then attended college in Easton, Pennsylvania, graduating from Lafayette College in 1893.

He married Lila S. Hansbrough (1878–1971), a stenographer and daughter of the house where he boarded in Washington, D.C., when he was 36 and she 31. They had one son, Earl G. Swem, Jr., who later attended the College of William and Mary and was a member of a secret society there.

== Career ==
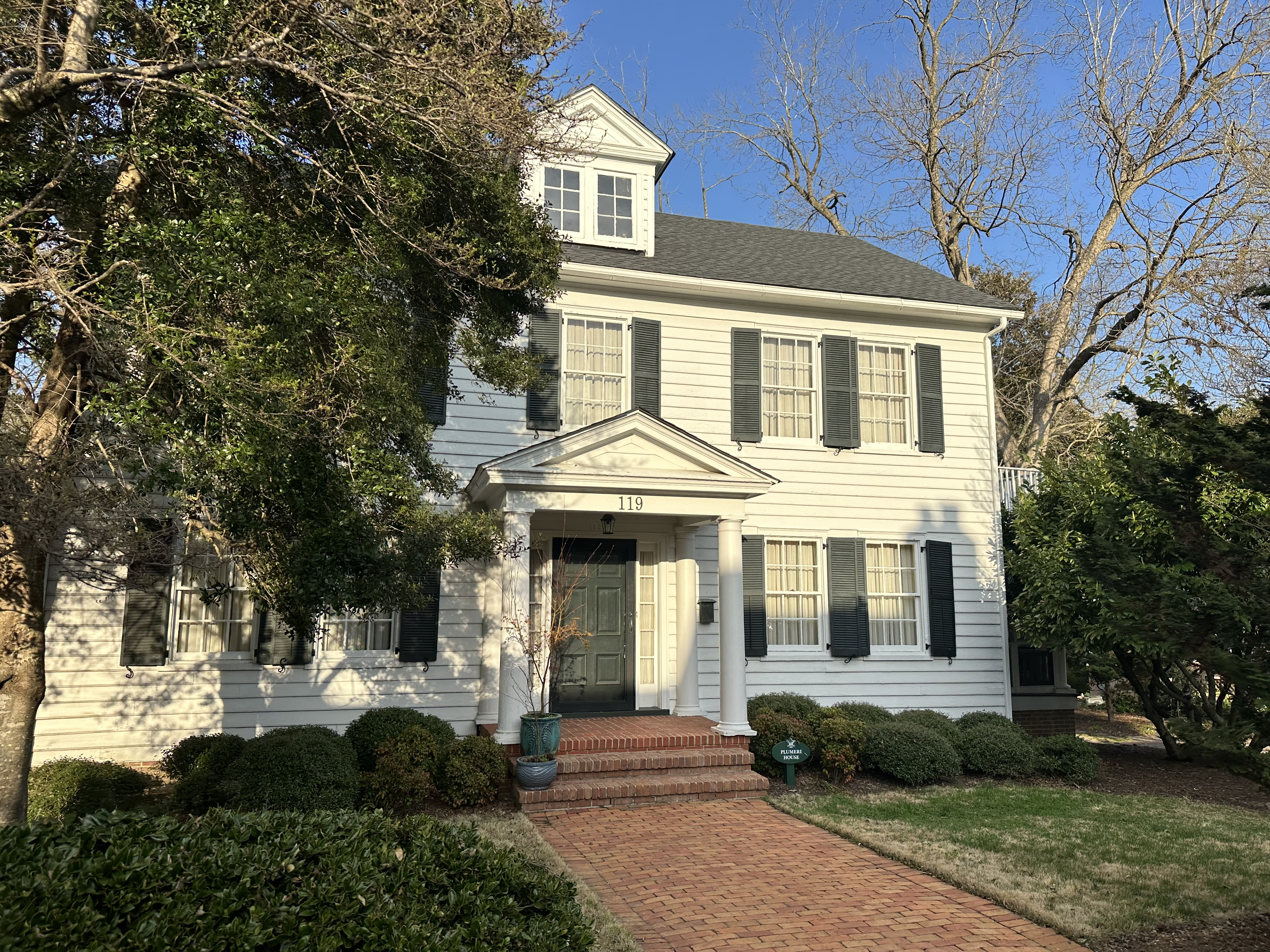
The Swem House in Williamsburg

After graduating from college, Swem worked at several libraries in Chicago. Around 1903 he moved to Washington, D.C., and began working at the Library of Congress, becoming chief of the cataloging division of the Copyright Office. In 1907, Swem moved to Richmond, Virginia, and became assistant state librarian of Virginia. During his 12 years in Richmond, Swem compiled numerous catalogs of indexes, finding lists and bibliographies in Virginia archives and at the Virginia State Library. He also preserved and increased the state library's collection of books, manuscript materials and historical records.

In 1920, Swem moved to the Williamsburg, Virginia, and accepted a position as librarian at the College of William and Mary, and also helped edit the William and Mary Quarterly (a magazine of early American history). By the time Swem retired in 1944, the William and Mary library collection grew from 25,000 books and 20,000 manuscripts to more than 240,000 books and approximately 400,000 manuscripts. Swem also made the library more accessible to its patrons by offering classes on library use to students and library assistants and (in a practice almost unheard of at that time) opening the stacks to students and the public. The Swems lived in the Chandler Court neighborhood alongside other faculty of the college.

In 1936 Swem completed the Virginia Historical Index, also known as "Swem's Index" or simply "Swem," which contains a million entries from seven sources. Reprinted in 1965 and 2003, it continues to be an important resource for genealogists and historians, especially of colonial Virginia. Sixteen members of the Virginia Historical Society and the Rockefeller Foundation (which also helped found Colonial Williamsburg) helped finance the original effort.

Swem was president of the Bibliographical Society of America in 1937-1938.

After his retirement from William and Mary in 1944, Swem continued to write short articles, as well as edit books and manuscripts on Virginia history and serve as librarian emeritus.

== Death and legacy ==
In their final years, the Swems moved to Louisville, Kentucky, to be near their son (who married a Kentuckian) and their grandchildren (including Earl Gregg Swem III). Earl Swem Sr. died aged ninety-four in 1965, two years after he learned the college's new library would be named in his honor and wrote a note for inclusion in the library's cornerstone, but a year before its completion. In recent years, the Earl Gregg Swem Library has celebrated its namesake by hosting events at which friends can be photographed with a life-size portrait of Swem dressed for a walk outdoors. In 2008 it acquired some of the family papers, which it holds in the Special Collections division.
