= Gloucester Point, Virginia =

- Census-designated place
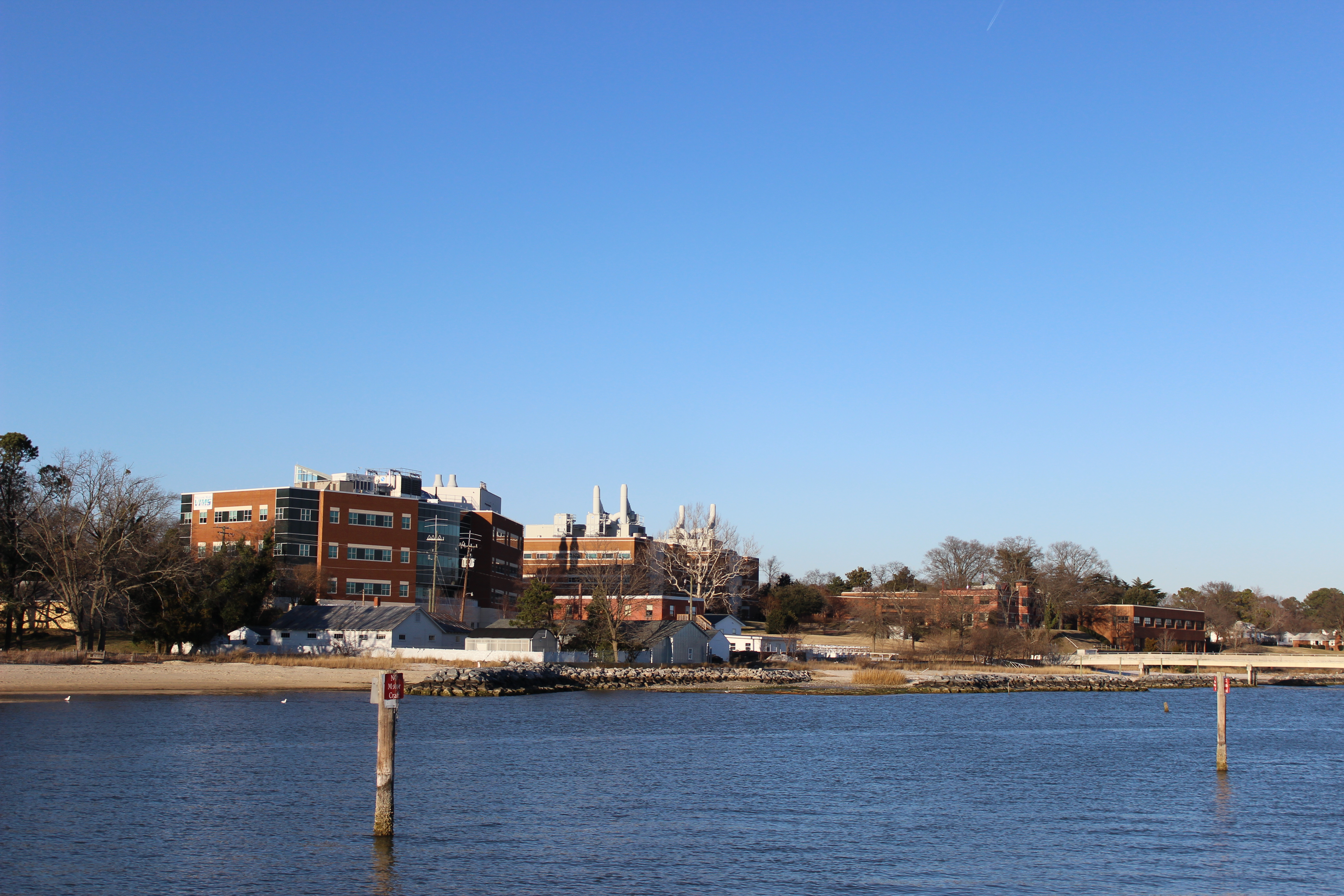
- Virginia Institute of Marine Science campus

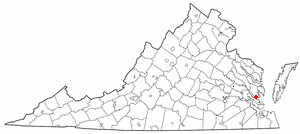
- Location of Gloucester Point, Virginia
- Coordinates: 37°16′12″N 76°29′55″W
- Country: United States
- State: Virginia
- County: Gloucester

Area
  - Total: 16.4 sq mi (42.4 km^{2})
  - Land: 9.4 sq mi (24.3 km^{2})
  - Water: 7.0 sq mi (18.1 km^{2})
- Elevation: 33 ft (10 m)

Population (2010)
  - Total: 9,402
  - Density: 1,000/sq mi (386.2/km^{2})
- Time zone: UTC−5 (Eastern (EST))
  - Summer (DST): UTC−4 (EDT)
- ZIP code: 23062
- Area code: 804
- FIPS code: 51-31616
- GNIS feature ID: 1493008

Gloucester Point is a census-designated place (CDP) in Gloucester County, Virginia, United States. As of the 2020 census, Gloucester Point had a population of 10,587. It is home to the College of William & Mary's Virginia Institute of Marine Science, a graduate school for the study of oceanography.

== History ==
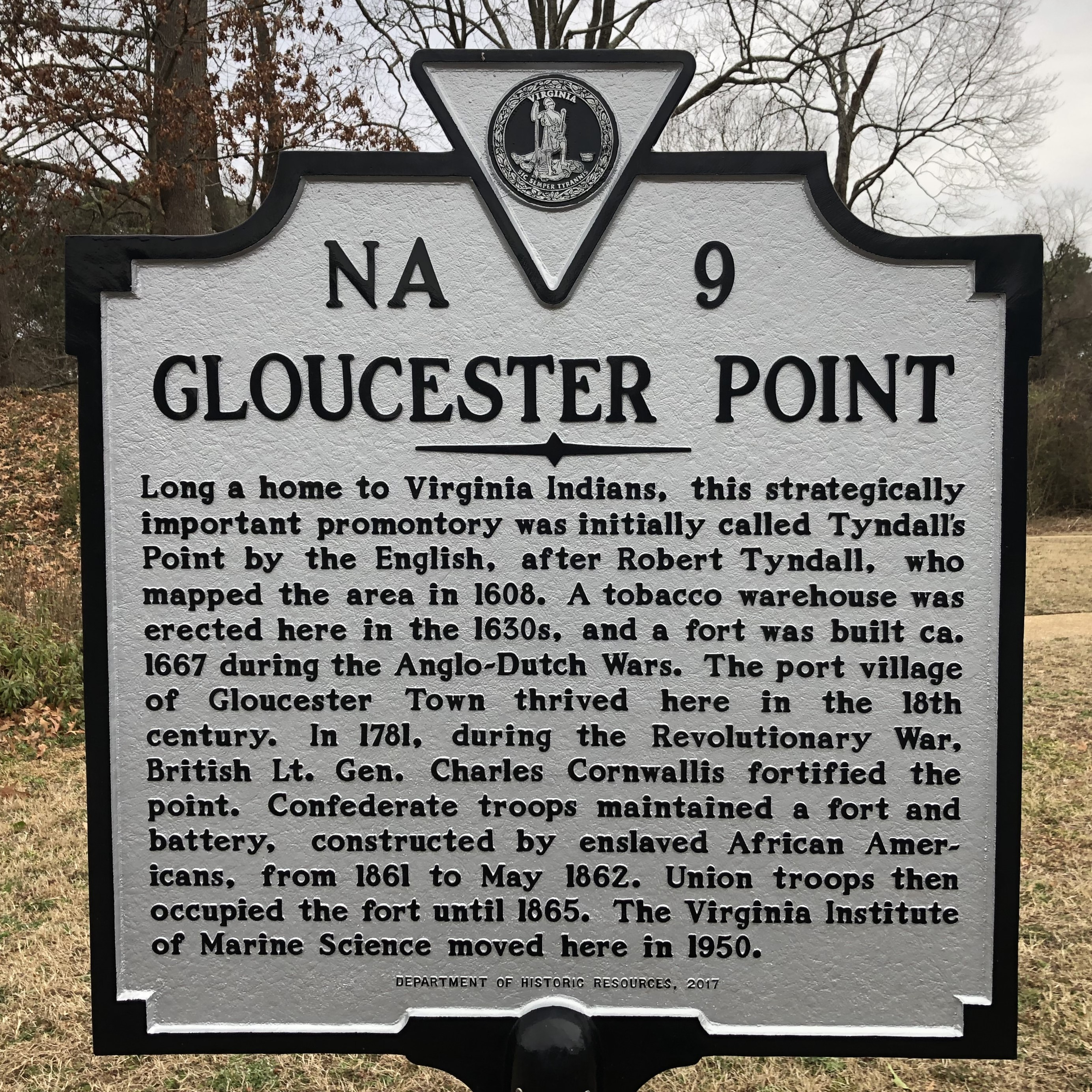
Historical marker for Gloucester Point, Virginia

Originally explored by English Christopher Newport, John Smith, and Robert Tyndall in 1608, "Tyndall's Point" was renamed to Gloucester at some point in the 1600s. The point is downstream from Werowocomoco, capital of the Powhatan Confederacy since the 1609.

== Geography ==
Gloucester Point is located in southern Gloucester County at 37°16′12″N 76°29′55″W (37.269907, −76.498604), on the north side of the York River in southeastern Virginia. To the south across the river on U.S. Route 17 and the George P. Coleman Memorial Bridge is Yorktown, site of the conclusion of the American Revolution. From Gloucester Point, US 17 leads south through Yorktown 18 miles (29 km) to the center of Newport News and north 12 miles (19 km) to Gloucester Courthouse, the Gloucester County seat.

According to the United States Census Bureau, the Gloucester Point CDP has a total area of 16.4 square miles (42.4 km^{2}), of which 9.4 square miles (24.3 km^{2}) are land and 7.0 square miles (18.1 km^{2}), or 42.58%, are water, consisting of the tidal York River and its inlets, including Sarah Creek and part of Timberneck Creek.

== Demographics ==
=== 2020 census ===
As of the 2020 census, Gloucester Point had a population of 10,587. The median age was 44.2 years. 20.0% of residents were under the age of 18 and 20.9% of residents were 65 years of age or older. For every 100 females there were 94.4 males, and for every 100 females age 18 and over there were 92.9 males age 18 and over.

99.6% of residents lived in urban areas, while 0.4% lived in rural areas.

There were 4,454 households in Gloucester Point, of which 26.2% had children under the age of 18 living in them. Of all households, 50.2% were married-couple households, 16.8% were households with a male householder and no spouse or partner present, and 25.5% were households with a female householder and no spouse or partner present. About 26.5% of all households were made up of individuals and 11.6% had someone living alone who was 65 years of age or older.

There were 4,840 housing units, of which 8.0% were vacant. The homeowner vacancy rate was 1.7% and the rental vacancy rate was 4.4%.

Racial composition as of the 2020 census
Race	Number	Percent
White	8,924	84.3%
Black or African American	686	6.5%
American Indian and Alaska Native	30	0.3%
Asian	122	1.2%
Native Hawaiian and Other Pacific Islander	7	0.1%
Some other race	115	1.1%
Two or more races	703	6.6%
Hispanic or Latino (of any race)	434	4.1%

=== 2000 census ===
As of the census of 2000, there were 9,429 people, 3,787 households, and 2,715 families residing in the CDP. The population density was 1,125.2 people per square mile (434.4/km^{2}). There were 4,071 housing units at an average density of 485.8/sq mi (187.6/km^{2}). The racial makeup of the CDP was 87.18% White, 9.16% African American, 0.47% Native American, 1.27% Asian, 0.06% Pacific Islander, 0.60% from other races, and 1.25% from two or more races. Hispanic or Latino of any race were 1.73% of the population.

There were 3,787 households, out of which 32.5% had children under the age of 18 living with them, 56.7% were married couples living together, 10.9% had a female householder with no husband present, and 28.3% were non-families. 22.3% of all households were made up of individuals, and 8.2% had someone living alone who was 65 years of age or older. The average household size was 2.49 and the average family size was 2.90.

In the CDP, the population was spread out, with 24.4% under the age of 18, 7.8% from 18 to 24, 30.9% from 25 to 44, 25.1% from 45 to 64, and 11.8% who were 65 years of age or older. The median age was 38 years. For every 100 females, there were 96.3 males. For every 100 females age 18 and over, there were 93.2 males.

The median income for a household in the CDP was $45,536, and the median income for a family was $52,888. Males had a median income of $35,855 versus $26,306 for females. The per capita income for the CDP was $20,536. About 8.6% of families and 8.9% of the population were below the poverty line, including 11.5% of those under age 18 and 9.2% of those age 65 or over.
