= Omohundro Institute of Early American History and Culture =

Research organization at the College of William & Mary

- Motto: Leading Early American Scholarship Since 1943
- Established: 1943
- Chair: Barbara Oberg (Executive Board); Jennifer L. Morgan (Council)
- Director: Catherine E. Kelly (Interim Director)
- Staff: 33
- Address: 427 Scotland Street; Williamsburg, Virginia 23185
- Location: Earl Gregg Swem Library
- Website: http://oieahc.wm.edu/

The Omohundro Institute of Early American History and Culture (OI) is an independent research organization located in Williamsburg, Virginia, sponsored by the College of William & Mary and the Colonial Williamsburg Foundation. Founded in 1943, the OI supports the scholars and scholarship of vast early America—a term used to describe the capacious histories of North America and related geographies, including foundational histories of indigenous peoples, the scale and impact of transatlantic slavery, and multidimensional European colonization and settlement, from the 1450s to the 1820s.

William & Mary and the Colonial Williamsburg Foundation founded the Institute of Early American History and Culture in 1943. In 1996, the name Omohundro was added to the Institute's name in recognition of a private donation from the late Mr. and Mrs. Malvern H. Omohundro, Jr.

== Publications ==
=== Books ===
The Institute publishes a select number of books each year on topics pertaining to the histories and cultures of North America from circa 1450 to 1820, including related developments in the British Isles, Europe, West Africa, and the Caribbean. Since the first book appeared in print in 1947, the OI has published over 247 titles, which have won a total of 208 awards.

The OI partners with the University of North Carolina Press in publishing its titles, and UNC Press also distributes the OI's books.

=== William and Mary Quarterly ===
The William and Mary Quarterly is an academic journal with a focus on early American history and culture. It ranges chronologically from Old World-New World contacts to about 1820. Geographically, it focuses on North America from New France and the Spanish-American borderlands to British America and the Caribbean and extends to Europe and West Africa. Although grounded in history, it welcomes works from all disciplines (for example, literature, law, political science, anthropology, archaeology, material culture, cultural studies) bearing on the early American period. Currently in its Third Series, the Quarterly is published in January, April, July, and October. The journal originated in 1892, making it one of the oldest scholarly journals in the United States.

=== Digital publications ===
In addition to peer-reviewed digital humanities projects such as Colonial Virginia Portraits,the OI also publishes the OI Reader, which features a digital edition of the William and Mary Quarterly as well as additional digital projects, and Commonplace.online in conjunction with the American Antiquarian Society. The OI also supports other digital humanities work in early American history including Enslaved.org and the Slave Voyages Project.

== Fellowships ==
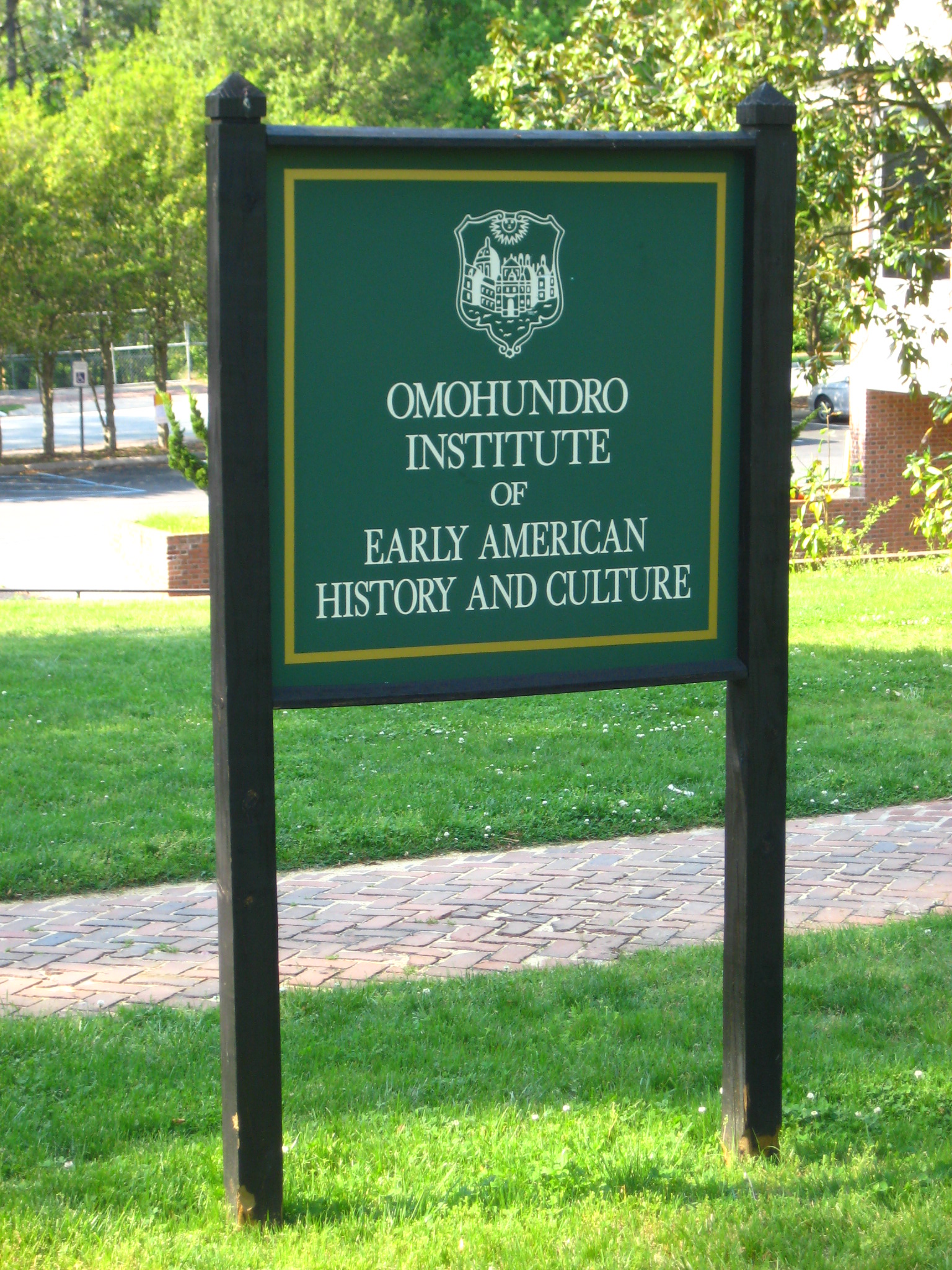
Sign on the campus of W&M

All OI fellowship applicants are evaluated by outside committees of scholars who volunteer their time and expertise. Opportunities are available for predoctoral through postdoctoral students, early career scholars, and senior career scholars. Please check the OI website for details.

== Events ==
Most OI events are open to the public; costs to the participant vary.

=== Annual conferences ===
The OI offers an annual conference in June each year. The location varies each year in order to accommodate a wide range of scholars. Panels and papers are chosen by an external committee. The committee typically represents a large variety of institutions and disciplines and is formed by members from the host institution. Graduate students, junior, mid-career and senior scholars are all invited to submit proposals via a Call for Papers; all levels of career achievement are likewise represented on the final program.

=== Topical conferences ===
The OI also typically offers one topically themed conference each year, usually in the fall. The location varies. An organizing theme or topic is proposed by a group of scholars who then form a program committee and issue a Call for Papers. The number of papers and panels offered is typically smaller than at the annual conference, likewise the overall number of participants.

=== WMQ-EMSI workshops ===
Each May, the William and Mary Quarterly in conjunction with the Early Modern Studies Institute at the University of Southern California conducts a workshop designed to identify and encourage new trends in our understanding of the history and culture of early North America. The participants are primarily mature scholars working on second or subsequent book projects; they share their work in progress with the aim of deepening and enriching their perspectives, their approaches, and ultimately the final products of their research.

=== Colloquia ===
The OI's colloquium meets four or five times a semester to discuss projects (usually a book chapter) in progress. The institute offers overnight accommodations and up to $300 for travel for those chosen to present their work.
