= 2017 Virginia lieutenant gubernatorial election =

- November 7, 2017
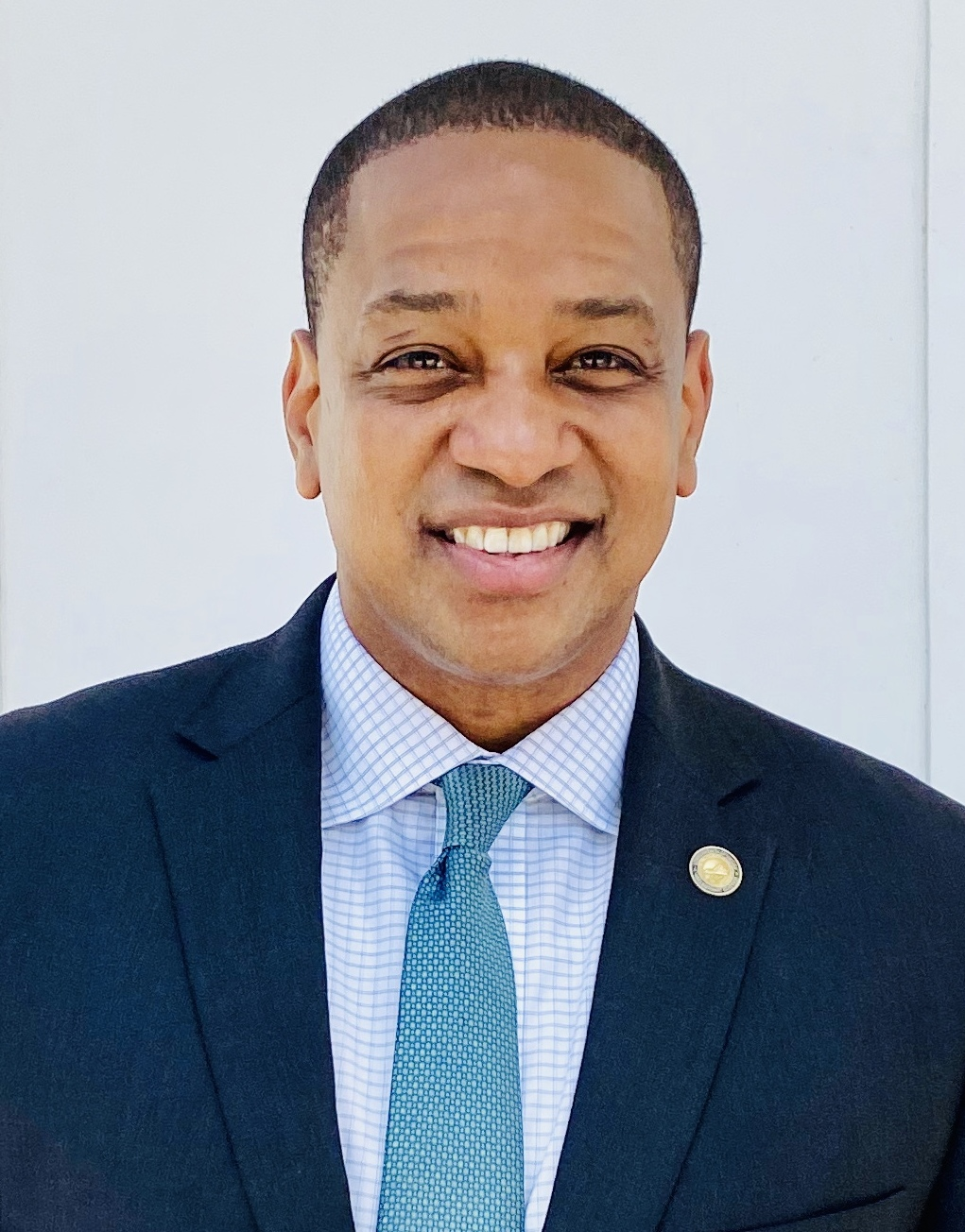

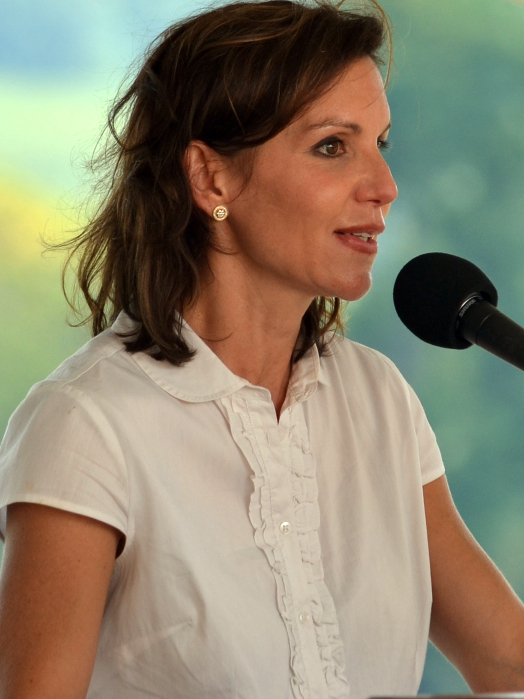
| Nominee | Justin Fairfax | Jill Vogel |
| Party | Democratic | Republican |
| Popular vote | 1,368,261 | 1,224,519 |
| Percentage | 52.72% | 47.18% |
- Fairfax: 40–50% 50–60% 60–70% 70–80% 80–90% >90% Vogel: 40–50% 50–60% 60–70% 70–80% 80–90% >90% Tie: 40–50% 50% No votes
Lieutenant Governor before election
Ralph Northam
Democratic
Elected Lieutenant Governor
Justin Fairfax
Democratic

The 2017 Virginia lieutenant gubernatorial election was held on November 7, 2017. After the party primary elections were held, the major party nominees were Jill Vogel (Republican) and Justin Fairfax (Democrat). The incumbent lieutenant governor, Democrat Ralph Northam, declined to run for re-election in order to run for governor. In the general election on November 7, 2017, Democratic nominee Justin Fairfax defeated Republican state senator Jill Vogel to become the 41st lieutenant governor of Virginia.

== Democratic primary ==
=== Nominee ===
- Justin Fairfax, former assistant United States Attorney and candidate for attorney general in 2013

=== Eliminated in primary ===
- Susan Platt, former chief of staff to Joe Biden
- Gene Rossi, former Assistant United States Attorney and former gubernatorial aide

=== Declined ===
- Kenny Alexander, mayor of Norfolk and former state senator
- David Bowers, former mayor of Roanoke and nominee for VA-06 in 1998
- Barbara Favola, state senator
- Eileen Filler-Corn, state delegate
- Mike Hamlar, businessman and candidate for the State Senate in 2015
- Charniele Herring, state delegate, former chair of the Democratic Party of Virginia, and candidate for VA-08 in 2014
- Anne Holton, former Virginia Secretary of Education, former Juvenile and Domestic Relations District Court Judge, and wife of Senator Tim Kaine
- Dwight C. Jones, former mayor of Richmond and former chair of the Democratic Party of Virginia
- Jennifer McClellan, state senator
- Ralph Northam, incumbent lieutenant governor (running for governor)
- Adam Parkhomenko, National Field Director for the Democratic National Committee, co-founder of Ready for Hillary and candidate for the State House in 2009
- Chap Petersen, state senator and candidate for lieutenant governor in 2005
- Sam Rasoul, state delegate and nominee for VA-06 in 2008
- Levar Stoney, mayor of Richmond and former Secretary of the Commonwealth of Virginia
- Molly Joseph Ward, Secretary of Natural Resources and former mayor of Hampton
- Jennifer Wexton, state senator (running for Congress)

=== Endorsements ===
Susan Platt

State representatives

- Ward Armstrong, former House Minority Leader
- Richard Cranwell, former House Majority Leader, former Democratic Party of Virginia chair
- Alan Diamonstein, former delegate
- Steve Heretic, state delegate
- Patrick Hope, state delegate
- Kaye Kory, state delegate
- Emilie Miller, former state senator
- Kathleen Murphy, state delegate
- Moody Stallings, former state senator
- Jody Wagner, former Virginia Secretary of Finance

Local representatives

- Connie Brennan, Nelson County supervisor
- Kelly Burk, mayor of Leesburg
- John Flannery, Loudoun County Soil and Water Conservation Board director
- John Foust, Fairfax County Supervisor
- Libby Garvey, Arlington County Board member
- Jasmine Gore, vice mayor of Hopewell
- Amy Laufer, Charlottesville City School Board chair
- Rosemary Mahan, Westmoreland County supervisor
- Ingrid Morroy, Arlington Commissioner of Revenue
- Meredith Richards, former Charlottesville vice mayor
- Patricia Richie-Folks, treasurer of Manassas City
- Jeanette Rishell, mayor of Manassas Park
- Kathy Smith, Fairfax County supervisor

Individuals

- Sandra Brandt, former DNC member
- Patsy Brown, CD-10 chairwoman
- Sheila Coats, with Black Women United for Action
- Hannah Hart, internet personality
- Susan Hippen, member of Board of Veteran Services, Commonwealth of VA
- Derek Kitts, veteran, former 9th Congressional District candidate
- Issac Sarver, chair of 9th Congressional District Democrats
- Linda Schultz, 2nd Congressional District Democratic Committee chair
- C.R Suddith Jr, president of Treasurers' Association of Virginia
- Graham Weinschenk, Virginia Young Democrats leader

=== Results ===
Results by county and independent city: Fairfax: Fairfax—70–80%; Fairfax—60–70%; Fairfax—50–60%; Fairfax—40–50%; Platt: Platt—40–50%; Platt—50–60%; Platt—60–70%

Democratic primary results
| Party | Candidate | Votes | % |
|---|---|---|---|
| Democratic | Justin Fairfax | 252,291 | 49.22% |
| Democratic | Susan Platt | 200,537 | 39.12% |
| Democratic | Gene Rossi | 59,797 | 11.66% |
| Total votes | | 512,625 | 100.00% |

== Republican primary ==
=== Candidates ===
==== Nominee ====
- Jill Vogel, state senator

==== Eliminated in primary ====
- Glenn Davis, state delegate
- Bryce Reeves, state senator

==== Declined ====
- Ben Cline, state delegate
- Micah Edmond, former congressional aide and nominee for VA-08 in 2014
- Shak Hill, financial consultant and candidate for the U.S. Senate in 2014
- E. W. Jackson, pastor, conservative activist, candidate for the U.S. Senate in 2012 and nominee for Lieutenant Governor in 2013 (endorsed Vogel)
- Israel O'Quinn, state delegate
- Ken Peterson, Goochland County supervisor
- David Ramadan, former state delegate (endorsed Vogel)
- Pete Snyder, technology executive and candidate for lieutenant governor in 2013
- Corey Stewart, chairman of the Prince William Board of County Supervisors and candidate for lieutenant governor in 2013 (running for governor)
- Scott Taylor, U.S. representative (endorsed Reeves)
- Danny Vargas, businessman and candidate for the State House in 2015

=== Endorsements ===
Glenn Davis

Federal officials

- Tom Davis, former U.S. representative

State officials

- Kirk Cox, majority leader of the Virginia House of Delegates
- Bob McDonnell, former governor of Virginia

Individuals

- Elwood Sanders, attorney, contributor to Virginia Right!
Bryce Reeves

Federal officials

- Tom Garrett, U.S. representative
- Ed Meese, former U.S. Attorney General

State legislators

- Rich Anderson, state delegate
- Dickie Bell, state delegate
- Kathy Byron, state delegate
- Jeff Campbell, state delegate
- Bill Carrico, state senator
- Ben Chafin, state senator
- Amanda Chase, state senator
- Mark Cole, state delegate
- John Cosgrove, state senator
- Bill DeSteph, state senator
- Mark Dudenhefer, state delegate
- Peter Farrell, state delegate
- Matt Fariss, state delegate
- Buddy Fowler, state delegate
- Nick Freitas, state delegate
- Emmett Hanger, state senator
- Chris Head, state delegate
- Bill Howell, Speaker of the Virginia House of Delegates
- Tim Hugo, state delegate
- Terry Kilgore, state delegate
- Jay Leftwich, state delegate
- Jim LeMunyon, state delegate
- Ryan McDougle, state senator
- Jackson Miller, state delegate
- Jason Miyares, state delegate
- Will Morefield, state delegate
- Rick Morris, state delegate
- Tommy Norment, Majority Leader of the Virginia Senate
- Bobby Orrock, state delegate
- Brenda Pogge, state delegate
- Margaret Ransone, state delegate
- Roxann Robinson, state delegate
- Bill Stanley, state senator
- Richard Stuart, state senator
- Glen Sturtevant, state senator
- Scott Taylor, former state delegate and U.S. representative
- Frank Wagner, state senator

Sheriffs and law enforcement officials

- Mark Amos, sheriff of Orange County
- Michael Brown, sheriff of Bedford County
- Chadwick Cubbage, sheriff of Page County
- David Decatur, sheriff of Stafford County
- Steve Dempsey, sheriff of King George County
- Danny Diggs, Sheriff of York County & Poquoson
- Keith Dunagan, sheriff of Wythe County
- Ashland Fortune, sheriff of Louisa County
- Todd Godwin, sheriff of Accomack County
- Chip Harding, sheriff of Albemarle County
- Roger Harris, sheriff of Spotsylvania County
- Paul Higgs, sheriff of Fredericksburg
- Glendell Hill, sheriff of Prince William County
- Darrell Hodges, sheriff of Cumberland County
- Scott Jenkins, sheriff of Culpeper County
- Alan Jones, sheriff of Charles City County
- Karl Leonard, sheriff of Chesterfield County
- Tony Lippa, sheriff of Caroline County
- James "Doc" Lyons, sheriff of Northumberland County
- Patrick McCranie, sheriff of Lancaster County
- Michael Mondul, sheriff of Danville
- Hank Partin, sheriff of Montgomery County
- Robert Plecker, sheriff of Bath County
- Brian Roberts, sheriff of Brunswick County
- Thomas Roseberry III, sheriff of Bland County
- Daniel Smith, sheriff of Patrick County
- Donald Smith, sheriff of Augusta County
- Steve Smith, sheriff of Richmond County
- Steven Smith, sheriff of Greene County
- Richard Vaughan, sheriff of Grayson County

Individuals

- Steve Forbes, chairman and editor-in-chief of Forbes Media
- Paul Galanti, former 2nd Commissioner of the Virginia Department of Veterans Services

=== Polling ===
| Poll source | Date(s) administered | Sample size (Note: Key: A – all adults RV – registered voters LV – likely voters V – unclear) | Margin of error | Glenn Davis | Bryce Reeves | Jill Vogel | Undecided |
|---|---|---|---|---|---|---|---|
| Public Opinion Strategies | September 18–21, 2016 | 800 | ±3.46% | 12% | 8% | 13% | 66% |

=== Results ===
Results by county and independent city: Vogel: Vogel—30–40%; Vogel—40–50%; Vogel—50–60%; Vogel—60–70%; Reeves: Reeves—30–40%; Reeves—40–50%; Reeves—50–60%; Reeves—60–70%; Reeves—70+%; Davis: Davis—30–40%

Republican primary results
| Party | Candidate | Votes | % |
|---|---|---|---|
| Republican | Jill Vogel | 151,984 | 42.78% |
| Republican | Bryce Reeves | 142,196 | 40.03% |
| Republican | Glenn Davis | 61,072 | 17.19% |
| Total votes | | 355,252 | 100.00% |

== General election ==
| Source | Ranking | As of |
|---|---|---|
| Sabato's Crystal Ball | Lean D | November 2, 2017 |

=== Endorsements ===
Justin Fairfax (D)

Federal officials

- Don Beyer, U.S. representative, VA-8
- Hillary Clinton, former U.S. Secretary of State
- Gerry Connolly, U.S. representative, VA-11
- Keith Ellison, U.S. representative, MN-5
- Tim Kaine, U.S. senator
- Donald McEachin, U.S. representative, VA-4
- Tom Perriello, U.S. representative, VA-5 (former)
- Mark Warner, U.S. senator

Statewide politicians

- Howard Dean, former governor of Vermont
- Alison Lundergan Grimes, Secretary of State of Kentucky
- Terry McAuliffe, governor of Virginia
- Martin O'Malley, former governor of Maryland
- Douglas Wilder, former governor of Virginia

State representatives

- Lashrecse Aird, delegate, 63rd District
- Lamont Bagby, delegate, 74th District
- Jeffrey Bourne, delegate, 71st District
- Rosalyn Dance, state senator, 16th District
- Paul Krizek, delegate, 44th District
- Chap Petersen, state senator, 34th District
- Marcus Simon, delegate, 53rd District
- Scott Surovell, state senator, 36th District
- Roslyn Tyler, delegate, 75th District

Local representatives

- Willie Bailey, City Council member, Alexandria
- Anton A. Bell, Commonwealth's Attorney, Hampton
- Muriel Bowser, mayor of Washington, D.C.
- John Chapman, City Council member, Alexandria
- Paige D. Cherry, Councilman and Democratic Party chair, Portsmouth
- Christian Dorsey, Board of Supervisors member, Arlington County
- Bill Euille, mayor emeritus, City of Alexandria
- Andrew Gillum, mayor of Tallahassee
- Penny Gross, Board of Supervisors member, Fairfax County
- Amelia Ross Hammond, councilwoman, Virginia Beach
- Raleigh H. Isaacs Sr., sheriff, Suffolk
- Stacey Kincaid, sheriff, Fairfax County & City
- James Lander, school board member and former chairman, Arlington County
- Sherman Lea Sr., mayor, Roanoke
- Chris Lewis, school board member, Alexandria
- Bob McCabe, sheriff, Norfolk
- Lisa Merkel, mayor, Town of Herndon
- Will J. Moffett, councilman, Hampton
- Stephanie N. Morales, Commonwealth's Attorney, Portsmouth
- Sheila Olem, councilwoman, Town of Herndon
- Gabe A. Morgan Sr., sheriff, Newport News
- Evans Poston, Commissioner of the Revenue, Norfolk
- Marcia Price, delegate, Newport News
- McKinley L. Price, mayor, Newport News
- Phyllis Randall, Board of Supervisors chairwoman, Loudoun County
- Paul R. Riddick, councilman, Norfolk
- Rachel Rifkind, Mason District Democratic Party chair, Fairfax County
- Koran Saines, Board of Supervisors member, Loudoun County
- Jason S. Samuels, school board chair, Hampton
- Theo Stamos, Arlington County Commonwealth's Attorney
- Kristen Umstattd, Board of Supervisors member, Loudoun County
- Tina Vick, vice mayor, Newport News
- Dr. Ella P. Ward, councilwoman, Chesapeake
- Angelia Williams Graves, councilwoman, Norfolk
- Derrick Wood, councilman, Town of Dumfries
- Dr. Reginald Woodhouse, school board member, Hampton
- Kenny Wright, mayor, Portsmouth

Party officials

- Dianne Carter de Mayo, Democratic Party chair, Gloucester
- Cesar Del Aguila, former Democratic Party chair, Fairfax County
- Linwood Fisher, Democratic Party chair, Norfolk
- Evelyn Morris Harris, DPVA chair, Democratic Black Caucus of Virginia
- Jaime Harrison, chair of the South Carolina Democratic Party
- Hallie J. Holmes, Democratic Party chair, Middlesex
- Nancy Payne, acting Democratic Party chair, Accomack County
- Leslie A. Rinaldi, Democratic Party chair, Suffolk
- Rex Simmons, former Democratic Party chair, Fairfax County
- Atima Omara, DNC committeewoman and former president, Young Democrats of America
- Terron Sims, II, DNC committeewoman and former president, Young Democrats of America
- Delores Thomas, Democratic Party co-chair, Newport News
- Edith Turner, Democratic Party co-chair, Mathews
- Bud Ward, Democratic Party co-chair, Mathews

Individuals

- Cornell William Brooks, president of NAACP
- Jason Winston George, actor
- Bettina Lawton, activist, former candidate for clerk of court, Fairfax County & City
- Piper Perabo, actress

Organizations

- Americans for Responsible Solutions
- CASA in Action
- Democracy for America
- Human Rights Campaign
- LGBT Democrats of Virginia
- NARAL Pro-Choice Virginia
- Our Revolution RVA
- People for the American Way
- Planned Parenthood Advocates of Virginia
- Progressive Change Campaign Committee
- Virginia AFL-CIO
- Virginia Education Association
- Virginia League of Conservation Voters
- Virginia Sierra Club
Jill Vogel (R)

Federal officials

- Barbara Comstock, U.S. representative, VA-10
- Bob Goodlatte, U.S. representative, VA-6
- Sean Spicer, former White House Press Secretary
- John Warner, former U.S. senator
- Frank Wolf, former U.S. representative, VA-10

Statewide politicians

- Jerry Kilgore, former Attorney General of Virginia and nominee for governor in 2005

State legislators

- Scott Lingamfelter, state delegate
- Joe May, former state delegate
- Steve Newman, state senator
- Mark Obenshain, state senator
- David Ramadan, former state delegate
- Bill Stanley, state senator
- Richard Stuart, state senator

Local officials

- Marc Abrams, Winchester City Commonwealth's Attorney
- Kenneth Alger, Page County Commonwealth's Attorney
- Ann Baskervill, Dinwiddie County Commonwealth's Attorney
- Chris Billias, Lexington City and Rockbridge County Commonwealth's Attorney
- Meg Bohmke, Stafford County Supervisor
- Joel Branscom, Botetourt County Commonwealth's Attorney
- Tony Buffington, Loudoun County Supervisor
- Ralph Buona, Loudoun County Supervisor
- Donald Caldwell, Roanoke City Commonwealth's Attorney
- Mike Caudill, Goochland County Commonwealth's Attorney
- Jack Cavalier, Stafford County Supervisor
- R. E. "Trip" Chalkley, Hanover County Commonwealth's Attorney
- Janet Clarke, former Loudoun County Supervisor
- Gary Clemens, Loudoun County Clerk of the Circuit Court
- Richard Cox, Powhatan County Commonwealth's Attorney
- William "Billy" Davenport, Chesterfield County Commonwealth's Attorney
- Betsy Davis, Mayor of Middleburg
- Eric DeKenipp, Loudoun County School Board member
- Vince Donoghue, Essex County Commonwealth's Attorney
- James Fisher, Fauquier County Commonwealth's Attorney
- Arthur Goff, Rappahannock County Commonwealth's Attorney
- Nathan Green, Williamsburg City and James City County Commonwealth's Attorney
- Robert "Bryan" Haskins, Pittsylvania County Commonwealth's Attorney
- Geary Higgins, Loudoun County Supervisor
- Beth Huck, Loudoun County School Board member
- Charlie King, 2015 Republican nominee for chairman of the Loudoun County Board of Supervisors
- Matt Letourneau, Loudoun County Supervisor
- Nathan Lyon, Carroll County Commonwealth's Attorney
- Gerald Mabe, Wythe County Commonwealth's Attorney
- Brian Madden, Warren County Commonwealth's Attorney
- Tracy Martin, Halifax County Commonwealth's Attorney
- Wendy Maurer, Stafford County Supervisor
- Ron Meyer, Loudoun County Supervisor
- Jeff Morse, Loudoun County School Board member
- Bundles Murdock, former Middleburg Town Council member
- Andrew Nester, Henry County Commonwealth's Attorney
- Michael Newman, Danville City Commonwealth's Attorney
- Jim Plowman, Loudoun County Commonwealth's Attorney
- Ken Reid, former Loudoun County Supervisor
- Debbie Rose, Loudoun County School Board member
- Christopher Russell, Buena Vista City Commonwealth's Attorney
- Jan Smith, Lancaster County Commonwealth's Attorney
- Gary Snellings, Stafford County Supervisor
- Ross Spicer, Frederick County Commonwealth's Attorney
- Kathy Sterne, Stafford Clerk of the Court
- Colin Stolle, Virginia Beach City Commonwealth's Attorney
- Greg Stone, former Loudoun County Community Criminal Justice Board member
- Jill Turgeon, Loudoun County School Board member
- Patricia Watson, Greensville County and Emporia City Commonwealth's Attorney
- Bob Wertz, Loudoun County Commissioner of the Revenue
- Amanda Wiseley, Shenandoah County Commonwealth's Attorney
- Scott York, former chairman of the Loudoun County Board of Supervisors
- Roger Zurn, Loudoun County Treasurer

Sheriffs and law enforcement officials

- Raymond Bell, sheriff of Sussex County
- David Bushey, sheriff of Middlesex County
- Timothy Carter, sheriff of Shenandoah County
- Mike Chapman, sheriff of Loudoun County
- Connie Compton, sheriff of Rappahannock County
- L. Trevor Craddock, sheriff of Craig County
- Chad Cubbage, sheriff of Page County
- Robert Deeds, sheriff of Williamsburg & James City County
- J. B. Gardner, sheriff of Carroll County
- Kevin Hall, sheriff of Alleghany County
- W. Randolph Hamilton Jr., sheriff of Buena Vista
- Joe Harris, sheriff of Waynesboro
- Bobby Hawkins, sheriff of Mecklenburg County
- Eric Hess, sheriff of Fluvanna County
- Darrell Hodges, sheriff of Cumberland County
- Steve Hutcherson, sheriff of Campbell County
- Bryan Hutcheson, sheriff of Rockingham County & Harrisonburg
- Thomas Jones, sheriff of Charlotte County
- Daniel McEathron, sheriff of Warren County
- Lenny Millholland, sheriff of Frederick County
- Bob Mosier, sheriff of Fauquier County
- David Neal, sheriff of Highland County
- Gary Parsons, sheriff of Lee County
- Lane Perry, sheriff of Henry County
- Tony Roper, sheriff of Clarke County
- Ronald Sprinkle, sheriff of Botetourt County
- Ken Stolle, sheriff of Virginia Beach
- Les Taylor, sheriff of Winchester
- Richard Vaughan, sheriff of Grayson County
- E. W. Viar Jr., sheriff of Amherst County
- Mike Wade, sheriff of Henrico County
- Jeff Walton, sheriff of King William County

Party officials and individuals

- Rick Buchanan, chair of the Virginia Tea Party Patriot Federation and vice chair of the Virginia Fifth Congressional District Republican Committee
- Tom Cherry, chairman of the Norfolk City Republican Committee
- Peter Churins, chairman of the Charles City County Republican Committee
- Will Estrada, chairman of the Loudoun County Republican Committee
- Carly Fiorina, businesswoman
- E.W. Jackson, pastor, conservative activist, candidate for U.S. Senate in 2012 and nominee in 2013
- Ed Levine, founder of Virginia Open Carry
- Dirk Maurer, former Stafford GOP chairman
- Jamie Radtke, candidate for the GOP nomination for U.S. Senate in 2012
- Charles Sterne, conservative activist
- Bob West, vice chair of the Norfolk City Republican Committee

Organizations

- Citizens for Responsible Energy Solutions
- Northern Virginia Chamber of Commerce
- Virginia Citizens Defense League, pro-gun organization
- Virginia Fraternal Order of Police

Newspapers

- Richmond Times-Dispatch
- The Virginian-Pilot
- The Winchester Star

=== Polling ===
| Poll source | Date(s) administered | Sample size | Margin of error | Justin Fairfax (D) | Jill Vogel (R) | Undecided |
|---|---|---|---|---|---|---|
| Change Research | November 2–5, 2017 | 3,648 | ±1.5% | 50% | 45% | 5% |
| The Polling Company (R) | November 2–5, 2017 | 800 | ±3.5% | 44% | 43% | 13% |
| Christopher Newport University | October 29–November 4, 2017 | 839 | ±3.5% | 50% | 45% | 5% |
| Gravis Marketing | October 30–November 3, 2017 | 1,143 | ±2.9% | 46% | 42% | 12% |
| The Polling Company (R) | October 30–November 2, 2017 | 800 | ±3.5% | 40% | 43% | 14% |
| Roanoke College | October 29–November 2, 2017 | 781 | ±3.5% | 45% | 45% | 10% |
| Suffolk University | October 30–November 1, 2017 | 500 | ±4.4% | 44% | 40% | 14% |
| Washington Post/Schar School | October 26–29, 2017 | 921 | ±4.0% | 49% | 43% | 6% |
| Christopher Newport University | October 20–25, 2017 | 812 | ±3.8% | 47% | 44% | 9% |
| Roanoke College | October 8–13, 2017 | 607 | ±4.0% | 45% | 42% | 13% |
| Christopher Newport University | October 2–6, 2017 | 928 | ±4.3% | 48% | 40% | 12% |
| Public Policy Polling | September 21–23, 2017 | 849 | ±3.8% | 43% | 37% | 21% |
| Christopher Newport University | September 12–22, 2017 | 776 | ±3.7% | 46% | 42% | 13% |
| Suffolk University | September 13–17, 2017 | 500 | ±4.4% | 36% | 35% | 27% |
| Mason-Dixon | September 10–15, 2017 | 625 | ±4.0% | 41% | 38% | 21% |
| University of Mary Washington | September 5–12, 2017 | 562 (LV) | ±5.2% | 45% | 40% | 11% |
| University of Mary Washington | September 5–12, 2017 | 867 (RV) | ±4.1% | 45% | 37% | 14% |
| Virginia Commonwealth University | July 17–25, 2017 | 538 (LV) | ±5.1% | 43% | 38% | 15% |
| Virginia Commonwealth University | July 17–25, 2017 | 707 (RV) | ±4.5% | 41% | 34% | 18% |
| Gravis Marketing | March 14–19, 2017 | 3,097 | ±1.6% | 40% | 37% | 23% |

Hypothetical polling

With Bryce Reeves

| Poll source | Date(s) administered | Sample size | Margin of error | Justin Fairfax (D) | Bryce Reeves (R) | Undecided |
|---|---|---|---|---|---|---|
| Gravis Marketing | March 14–19, 2017 | 3,097 | ±1.6% | 41% | 35% | 24% |

With Glenn Davis

| Poll source | Date(s) administered | Sample size | Margin of error | Justin Fairfax (D) | Glenn Davis (R) | Undecided |
|---|---|---|---|---|---|---|
| Gravis Marketing | March 14–19, 2017 | 3,097 | ±1.6% | 42% | 37% | 21% |

=== Results ===
2017 Virginia lieutenant gubernatorial election
| Party | Candidate | Votes | % | ±% |
|---|---|---|---|---|
| Democratic | Justin Fairfax | 1,368,261 | 52.72 | –2.40 |
| Republican | Jill Vogel | 1,224,519 | 47.18 | +2.64 |
| Write-in | | 2,446 | 0.09 | –0.25 |
| Total votes | | 2,595,225 | 100.00 | N/A |
| Democratic hold | | | | |

==== By county and independent city ====
| Locality | Justin Fairfax Democratic | | Jill Vogel Republican | | Write-in Various | | Margin | | Total votes cast |
| Locality | # | % | # | % | # | % | # | % | Total votes cast |
|---|---|---|---|---|---|---|---|---|---|
| Accomack | 4,468 | 42.45% | 6,055 | 57.53% | 2 | 0.02% | −1,587 | −15.08% | 10,525 |
| Albemarle | 26,386 | 62.77% | 15,620 | 37.16% | 27 | 0.06% | 10,766 | 25.61% | 42,033 |
| Alexandria | 40,342 | 77.78% | 11,468 | 22.11% | 56 | 0.11% | 28,874 | 55.67% | 51,866 |
| Alleghany | 1,376 | 31.44% | 2,999 | 68.52% | 2 | 0.05% | −1,623 | −37.08% | 4,377 |
| Amelia | 1,351 | 29.41% | 3,241 | 70.55% | 2 | 0.04% | −1,890 | −41.14% | 4,594 |
| Amherst | 3,126 | 32.15% | 6,583 | 67.71% | 14 | 0.14% | −3,457 | −35.55% | 9,723 |
| Appomattox | 1,155 | 22.43% | 3,989 | 77.47% | 5 | 0.10% | −2,834 | −55.04% | 5,149 |
| Arlington | 66,818 | 79.05% | 17,615 | 20.84% | 88 | 0.10% | 49,203 | 58.21% | 84,521 |
| Augusta | 5,749 | 24.56% | 17,640 | 75.37% | 17 | 0.07% | −11,891 | −50.80% | 23,406 |
| Bath | 432 | 29.35% | 1,039 | 70.58% | 1 | 0.07% | −607 | −41.24% | 1,472 |
| Bedford | 6,348 | 22.97% | 21,276 | 76.98% | 15 | 0.05% | −14,928 | −54.01% | 27,639 |
| Bland | 378 | 18.44% | 1,670 | 81.46% | 2 | 0.10% | −1,292 | −63.02% | 2,050 |
| Botetourt | 3,084 | 24.82% | 9,329 | 75.08% | 13 | 0.10% | −6,245 | −50.26% | 12,426 |
| Bristol | 1,206 | 28.58% | 3,009 | 71.32% | 4 | 0.09% | −1,803 | −42.74% | 4,219 |
| Brunswick | 2,709 | 57.04% | 2,039 | 42.94% | 1 | 0.02% | 670 | 14.11% | 4,749 |
| Buchanan | 1,183 | 26.83% | 3,220 | 73.02% | 7 | 0.16% | −2,037 | −46.19% | 4,410 |
| Buckingham | 1,880 | 41.15% | 2,687 | 58.81% | 2 | 0.04% | −807 | −17.66% | 4,569 |
| Buena Vista | 485 | 29.92% | 1,135 | 70.02% | 1 | 0.06% | −650 | −40.10% | 1,621 |
| Campbell | 4,070 | 23.53% | 13,206 | 76.34% | 23 | 0.13% | −9,136 | −52.81% | 17,299 |
| Caroline | 4,070 | 48.83% | 4,261 | 51.12% | 4 | 0.05% | −191 | −2.29% | 8,335 |
| Carroll | 1,759 | 21.43% | 6,445 | 78.53% | 3 | 0.04% | −4,686 | −57.10% | 8,207 |
| Charles City | 1,698 | 62.80% | 1,005 | 37.17% | 1 | 0.04% | 693 | 25.63% | 2,704 |
| Charlotte | 1,393 | 34.98% | 2,582 | 64.84% | 7 | 0.18% | −1,189 | −29.86% | 3,982 |
| Charlottesville | 13,687 | 84.14% | 2,562 | 15.75% | 18 | 0.11% | 11,125 | 68.39% | 16,267 |
| Chesapeake | 37,034 | 51.31% | 35,086 | 48.61% | 54 | 0.07% | 1,948 | 2.70% | 72,174 |
| Chesterfield | 57,845 | 48.89% | 60,386 | 51.03% | 97 | 0.08% | −2,541 | −2.15% | 118,328 |
| Clarke | 2,247 | 40.53% | 3,290 | 59.34% | 7 | 0.13% | −1,043 | −18.81% | 5,544 |
| Colonial Heights | 1,310 | 25.55% | 3,816 | 74.41% | 2 | 0.04% | −2,506 | −48.87% | 5,128 |
| Covington | 492 | 36.77% | 845 | 63.15% | 1 | 0.07% | −353 | −26.38% | 1,338 |
| Craig | 390 | 21.32% | 1,438 | 78.62% | 1 | 0.05% | −1,048 | −57.30% | 1,829 |
| Culpeper | 4,842 | 35.82% | 8,660 | 64.06% | 16 | 0.12% | −3,818 | −28.24% | 13,518 |
| Cumberland | 1,279 | 40.99% | 1,839 | 58.94% | 2 | 0.06% | −560 | −17.95% | 3,120 |
| Danville | 6,095 | 55.86% | 4,808 | 44.07% | 8 | 0.07% | 1,287 | 11.80% | 10,911 |
| Dickenson | 995 | 29.28% | 2,400 | 70.63% | 3 | 0.09% | −1,405 | −41.35% | 3,398 |
| Dinwiddie | 3,648 | 43.91% | 4,655 | 56.03% | 5 | 0.06% | −1,007 | −12.12% | 8,308 |
| Emporia | 918 | 56.91% | 693 | 42.96% | 2 | 0.12% | 225 | 13.95% | 1,613 |
| Essex | 1,681 | 45.53% | 2,008 | 54.39% | 3 | 0.08% | −327 | −8.86% | 3,692 |
| Fairfax City | 5,340 | 64.80% | 2,894 | 35.12% | 7 | 0.08% | 2,446 | 29.68% | 8,241 |
| Fairfax County | 251,388 | 67.25% | 122,021 | 32.64% | 424 | 0.11% | 129,367 | 34.61% | 373,833 |
| Falls Church | 4,661 | 77.70% | 1,333 | 22.22% | 5 | 0.08% | 3,328 | 55.48% | 5,999 |
| Fauquier | 8,962 | 37.30% | 15,033 | 62.57% | 31 | 0.13% | −6,071 | −25.27% | 24,026 |
| Floyd | 1,820 | 33.41% | 3,623 | 66.50% | 5 | 0.09% | −1,803 | −33.09% | 5,448 |
| Fluvanna | 4,143 | 45.25% | 5,004 | 54.65% | 9 | 0.10% | −861 | −9.40% | 9,156 |
| Franklin City | 1,480 | 58.06% | 1,068 | 41.90% | 1 | 0.04% | 412 | 16.16% | 2,549 |
| Franklin County | 4,870 | 27.95% | 12,539 | 71.98% | 12 | 0.07% | −7,669 | −44.02% | 17,421 |
| Frederick | 7,794 | 32.15% | 16,430 | 67.76% | 22 | 0.09% | −8,636 | −35.62% | 24,246 |
| Fredericksburg | 4,564 | 63.89% | 2,571 | 35.99% | 8 | 0.11% | 1,993 | 27.90% | 7,143 |
| Galax | 388 | 28.74% | 951 | 70.44% | 11 | 0.81% | −563 | −41.70% | 1,350 |
| Giles | 1,499 | 26.11% | 4,237 | 73.80% | 5 | 0.09% | −2,738 | −47.69% | 5,741 |
| Gloucester | 4,103 | 32.62% | 8,470 | 67.34% | 5 | 0.04% | −4,367 | −34.72% | 12,578 |
| Goochland | 3,791 | 36.08% | 6,708 | 63.84% | 8 | 0.08% | −2,917 | −27.76% | 10,507 |
| Grayson | 993 | 22.14% | 3,491 | 77.82% | 2 | 0.04% | −2,498 | −55.68% | 4,486 |
| Greene | 2,137 | 34.25% | 4,100 | 65.71% | 3 | 0.05% | −1,963 | −31.46% | 6,240 |
| Greensville | 1,638 | 57.09% | 1,229 | 42.84% | 2 | 0.07% | 409 | 14.26% | 2,869 |
| Halifax | 3,933 | 38.17% | 6,364 | 61.77% | 6 | 0.06% | −2,431 | −23.60% | 10,303 |
| Hampton | 28,488 | 70.84% | 11,656 | 28.98% | 71 | 0.18% | 16,832 | 41.86% | 40,215 |
| Hanover | 14,236 | 33.09% | 28,726 | 66.77% | 58 | 0.13% | −14,490 | −33.68% | 43,020 |
| Harrisonburg | 6,431 | 62.93% | 3,772 | 36.91% | 17 | 0.17% | 2,659 | 26.02% | 10,220 |
| Henrico | 68,691 | 59.91% | 45,816 | 39.96% | 146 | 0.13% | 22,875 | 19.95% | 114,653 |
| Henry | 4,706 | 33.70% | 9,244 | 66.19% | 15 | 0.11% | −4,538 | −32.50% | 13,965 |
| Highland | 312 | 30.14% | 722 | 69.76% | 1 | 0.10% | −410 | −39.61% | 1,035 |
| Hopewell | 2,645 | 48.81% | 2,766 | 51.04% | 8 | 0.15% | −121 | −2.23% | 5,419 |
| Isle of Wight | 5,648 | 40.18% | 8,404 | 59.78% | 6 | 0.04% | −2,756 | −19.60% | 14,058 |
| James City | 14,928 | 47.15% | 16,710 | 52.77% | 26 | 0.08% | −1,782 | −5.63% | 31,664 |
| King and Queen | 1,006 | 40.81% | 1,457 | 59.11% | 2 | 0.08% | −451 | −18.30% | 2,465 |
| King George | 2,577 | 36.18% | 4,537 | 63.70% | 8 | 0.11% | −1,960 | −27.52% | 7,122 |
| King William | 1,936 | 32.57% | 4,001 | 67.31% | 7 | 0.12% | −2,065 | −34.74% | 5,944 |
| Lancaster | 1,966 | 41.09% | 2,815 | 58.83% | 4 | 0.08% | −849 | −17.74% | 4,785 |
| Lee | 1,430 | 21.99% | 5,065 | 77.89% | 8 | 0.12% | −3,635 | −55.90% | 6,503 |
| Lexington | 1,102 | 63.52% | 631 | 36.37% | 2 | 0.12% | 471 | 27.15% | 1,735 |
| Loudoun | 67,768 | 57.96% | 49,066 | 41.96% | 89 | 0.08% | 18,702 | 16.00% | 116,923 |
| Louisa | 4,336 | 37.00% | 7,373 | 62.91% | 10 | 0.09% | −3,037 | −25.92% | 11,719 |
| Lunenburg | 1,429 | 39.45% | 2,191 | 60.49% | 2 | 0.06% | −762 | −21.04% | 3,622 |
| Lynchburg | 9,384 | 44.58% | 11,640 | 55.30% | 25 | 0.12% | −2,256 | −10.72% | 21,049 |
| Madison | 1,739 | 35.56% | 3,147 | 64.34% | 5 | 0.10% | −1,408 | −28.79% | 4,891 |
| Manassas | 5,211 | 56.36% | 4,025 | 43.53% | 10 | 0.11% | 1,186 | 12.83% | 9,246 |
| Manassas Park | 1,940 | 63.54% | 1,111 | 36.39% | 2 | 0.07% | 829 | 27.15% | 3,053 |
| Martinsville | 2,119 | 57.61% | 1,552 | 42.20% | 7 | 0.19% | 567 | 15.42% | 3,678 |
| Mathews | 1,291 | 32.95% | 2,624 | 66.97% | 3 | 0.08% | −1,333 | −34.02% | 3,918 |
| Mecklenburg | 3,357 | 39.42% | 5,158 | 60.58% | 0 | 0.00% | −1,801 | −21.15% | 8,515 |
| Middlesex | 1,534 | 35.81% | 2,748 | 64.15% | 2 | 0.05% | −1,214 | −28.34% | 4,284 |
| Montgomery | 14,402 | 51.56% | 13,507 | 48.36% | 21 | 0.08% | 895 | 3.20% | 27,930 |
| Nelson | 2,956 | 48.32% | 3,157 | 51.61% | 4 | 0.07% | −201 | −3.29% | 6,117 |
| New Kent | 2,624 | 30.77% | 5,902 | 69.21% | 2 | 0.02% | −3,278 | −38.44% | 8,528 |
| Newport News | 29,685 | 63.63% | 16,923 | 36.28% | 42 | 0.09% | 12,762 | 27.36% | 46,650 |
| Norfolk | 37,851 | 70.90% | 15,464 | 28.97% | 69 | 0.13% | 22,387 | 41.94% | 53,384 |
| Northampton | 2,250 | 52.08% | 2,067 | 47.85% | 3 | 0.07% | 183 | 4.24% | 4,320 |
| Northumberland | 1,932 | 36.45% | 3,363 | 63.44% | 6 | 0.11% | −1,431 | −26.99% | 5,301 |
| Norton | 310 | 36.60% | 536 | 63.28% | 1 | 0.12% | −226 | −26.68% | 847 |
| Nottoway | 1,756 | 41.53% | 2,467 | 58.35% | 5 | 0.12% | −711 | −16.82% | 4,228 |
| Orange | 4,022 | 37.06% | 6,817 | 62.81% | 14 | 0.13% | −2,795 | −25.75% | 10,853 |
| Page | 1,723 | 26.00% | 4,890 | 73.80% | 13 | 0.20% | −3,167 | −47.80% | 6,626 |
| Patrick | 1,286 | 23.05% | 4,290 | 76.88% | 4 | 0.07% | −3,004 | −53.84% | 5,580 |
| Petersburg | 7,130 | 87.82% | 983 | 12.11% | 6 | 0.07% | 6,147 | 75.71% | 8,119 |
| Pittsylvania | 5,536 | 28.45% | 13,914 | 71.50% | 9 | 0.05% | −8,378 | −43.05% | 19,459 |
| Poquoson | 1,170 | 24.35% | 3,628 | 75.52% | 6 | 0.12% | −2,458 | −51.17% | 4,804 |
| Portsmouth | 19,559 | 68.60% | 8,923 | 31.30% | 28 | 0.10% | 10,636 | 37.31% | 28,510 |
| Powhatan | 2,989 | 26.04% | 8,475 | 73.82% | 16 | 0.14% | −5,486 | −47.79% | 11,480 |
| Prince Edward | 2,809 | 50.10% | 2,789 | 49.74% | 9 | 0.16% | 20 | 0.36% | 5,607 |
| Prince George | 4,058 | 39.62% | 6,178 | 60.32% | 6 | 0.06% | −2,120 | −20.70% | 10,242 |
| Prince William | 72,454 | 60.60% | 46,943 | 39.26% | 168 | 0.14% | 25,511 | 21.34% | 119,565 |
| Pulaski | 3,254 | 28.02% | 8,342 | 71.83% | 17 | 0.15% | −5,088 | −43.81% | 11,613 |
| Radford | 2,067 | 52.95% | 1,832 | 46.93% | 5 | 0.13% | 235 | 6.02% | 3,904 |
| Rappahannock | 1,429 | 43.83% | 1,827 | 56.04% | 4 | 0.12% | −398 | −12.21% | 3,260 |
| Richmond City | 57,346 | 80.97% | 13,417 | 18.94% | 62 | 0.09% | 43,929 | 62.02% | 70,825 |
| Richmond County | 837 | 35.47% | 1,522 | 64.49% | 1 | 0.04% | −685 | −29.03% | 2,360 |
| Roanoke City | 14,494 | 60.11% | 9,591 | 39.77% | 29 | 0.12% | 4,903 | 20.33% | 24,114 |
| Roanoke County | 11,574 | 34.49% | 21,946 | 65.40% | 39 | 0.12% | −10,372 | −30.91% | 33,559 |
| Rockbridge | 2,771 | 35.25% | 5,085 | 64.68% | 6 | 0.08% | −2,314 | −29.43% | 7,862 |
| Rockingham | 6,824 | 27.23% | 18,219 | 72.70% | 18 | 0.07% | −11,395 | −45.47% | 25,061 |
| Russell | 1,543 | 23.26% | 5,084 | 76.64% | 7 | 0.11% | −3,541 | −53.38% | 6,634 |
| Salem | 2,856 | 35.22% | 5,242 | 64.64% | 11 | 0.14% | −2,386 | −29.42% | 8,109 |
| Scott | 1,165 | 19.22% | 4,886 | 80.60% | 11 | 0.18% | −3,721 | −61.38% | 6,062 |
| Shenandoah | 3,487 | 26.34% | 9,740 | 73.58% | 10 | 0.08% | −6,253 | −47.24% | 13,237 |
| Smyth | 1,790 | 22.83% | 6,049 | 77.16% | 1 | 0.01% | −4,259 | −54.32% | 7,840 |
| Southampton | 2,434 | 39.79% | 3,679 | 60.14% | 4 | 0.07% | −1,245 | −20.35% | 6,117 |
| Spotsylvania | 15,531 | 42.41% | 21,026 | 57.42% | 60 | 0.16% | −5,495 | −15.01% | 36,617 |
| Stafford | 18,563 | 45.89% | 21,840 | 54.00% | 44 | 0.11% | −3,277 | −8.10% | 40,447 |
| Staunton | 3,956 | 52.76% | 3,534 | 47.13% | 8 | 0.11% | 422 | 5.63% | 7,498 |
| Suffolk | 16,071 | 56.62% | 12,294 | 43.32% | 17 | 0.06% | 3,777 | 13.31% | 28,382 |
| Surry | 1,633 | 55.47% | 1,310 | 44.50% | 1 | 0.03% | 323 | 10.97% | 2,944 |
| Sussex | 1,788 | 55.44% | 1,437 | 44.56% | 0 | 0.00% | 351 | 10.88% | 3,225 |
| Tazewell | 1,837 | 18.41% | 8,130 | 81.47% | 12 | 0.12% | −6,293 | −63.06% | 9,979 |
| Virginia Beach | 62,086 | 48.74% | 65,190 | 51.18% | 104 | 0.08% | −3,104 | −2.44% | 127,380 |
| Warren | 3,410 | 32.98% | 6,920 | 66.92% | 10 | 0.10% | −3,510 | −33.95% | 10,340 |
| Washington | 3,975 | 24.50% | 12,242 | 75.44% | 10 | 0.06% | −8,267 | −50.95% | 16,227 |
| Waynesboro | 2,578 | 44.33% | 3,231 | 55.55% | 7 | 0.12% | −653 | −11.23% | 5,816 |
| Westmoreland | 2,375 | 44.63% | 2,939 | 55.22% | 8 | 0.15% | −564 | −10.60% | 5,322 |
| Williamsburg | 3,656 | 69.59% | 1,596 | 30.38% | 2 | 0.04% | 2,060 | 39.21% | 5,254 |
| Winchester | 3,327 | 50.28% | 3,287 | 49.68% | 3 | 0.05% | 40 | 0.60% | 6,617 |
| Wise | 2,024 | 23.89% | 6,439 | 75.99% | 10 | 0.12% | −4,415 | −52.11% | 8,473 |
| Wythe | 1,974 | 23.39% | 6,449 | 76.42% | 16 | 0.19% | −4,475 | −53.03% | 8,439 |
| York | 9,612 | 41.81% | 13,357 | 58.10% | 21 | 0.09% | −3,745 | −16.29% | 22,990 |
| Totals | 1,368,261 | 52.72% | 1,224,519 | 47.18% | 2,446 | 0.09% | 143,742 | 5.54% | 2,595,226 |

Counties and independent cities that flipped from Democratic to Republican

- Accomack (largest city: Chincoteague)
- Alleghany (largest city: Clifton Forge)
- Buckingham (largest city: Dillwyn)
- Caroline (largest city: Bowling Green)
- Chesterfield (largest city: Chester)
- Covington (independent city)
- Cumberland (largest city: Farmville)
- Dinwiddie (largest city: McKenney)
- Essex (largest city: Tappahannock)
- Hopewell (independent city)
- James City (largest city: Williamsburg)
- King and Queen (largest city: King and Queen Court House)
- Lancaster (largest city: Kilmarnock)
- Lunenburg (largest city: Victoria)
- Middlesex (largest city: Urbanna)
- Nelson (largest city: Nellysford)
- Northumberland (largest city: Heathsville)
- Nottoway (largest city: Blackstone)
- Rockbridge (largest city: Lexington)
- Southampton (largest city: Courtland)
- Virginia Beach (independent city)
- Westmoreland (largest city: Colonial Beach)

==== By congressional district ====
Fairfax won five of 11 congressional districts, including one that was represented by a Republican.

| District | Fairfax | Vogel | Representative |
|---|---|---|---|
| 1st | 43% | 57% | Rob Wittman |
| 2nd | 49% | 51% | Scott Taylor |
| 3rd | 67% | 33% | Bobby Scott |
| 4th | 61% | 39% | Donald McEachin |
| 5th | 44% | 56% | Tom Garrett |
| 6th | 37% | 63% | Bob Goodlatte |
| 7th | 47% | 53% | Dave Brat |
| 8th | 75% | 25% | Don Beyer |
| 9th | 31% | 69% | Morgan Griffith |
| 10th | 54% | 46% | Barbara Comstock |
| 11th | 70% | 30% | Gerry Connolly |

== See also ==
- 2017 United States elections
- 2017 Virginia gubernatorial election
- 2017 Virginia Attorney General election
- 2017 Virginia House of Delegates election
- 2017 Virginia elections
