= 2005 Virginia gubernatorial election =

- November 8, 2005
- Turnout: 45.0% ▼1.4
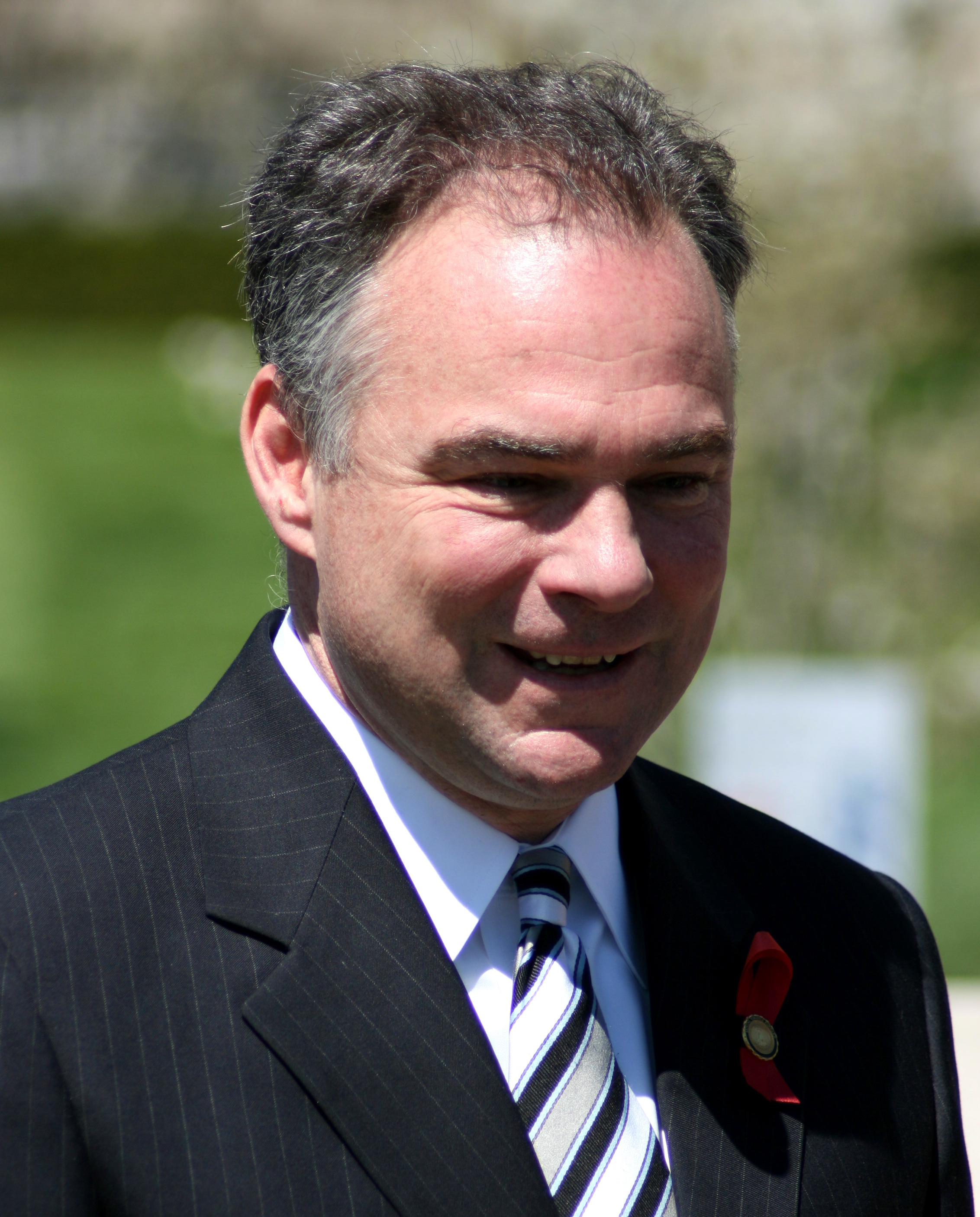

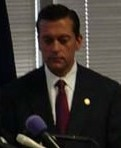
Nominee	Tim Kaine	Jerry Kilgore
Party	Democratic	Republican
Popular vote	1,025,942	912,327
Percentage	51.72%	45.99%
- Kaine: 40–50% 50–60% 60–70% 70–80% 80–90% >90% Kilgore: 40–50% 50–60% 60–70% 70–80% 80–90%
Governor before election
Mark Warner
Democratic
Elected Governor
Tim Kaine
Democratic

The 2005 Virginia gubernatorial election was held on November 8, 2005, to elect the governor of Virginia. Democratic lieutenant governor Tim Kaine defeated Republican former attorney general Jery Kilgore. Incumbent Democratic governor Mark Warner was ineligible to seek re-election to a second term due to the state's prohibition on consecutive gubernatorial terms.

Primary elections were held on June 14, 2005, in which Kaine and Kilgore won with little opposition. Governor Warner maintained high approval ratings in the state with 70–80% job approval — Kaine consistently associated himself with him. Kilgore ran a heavily aggressive campaign by attacking Kaine as an "out-of-touch liberal" who supported tax increases and opposed the death penalty. Kilgore lead in the initial polls though his aggressive campaign strategy failed to resonate, and Kaine had become favored in polling by Election Day.

Virginia was considered competitive throughout the election, while the state's historical precedent of voting the party not in the presidential office since 1977 was noted as an important factor in the campaign. The election was largely viewed as a referendum on President Bush's second term ahead of the 2006 midterms by political pundits. Bush's late appearance in the state was viewed by both political parties as an attempt to potentially motivate their voters on Election Day. Warner's popularity and Kaine's focus on affordability were seen as the main factors for Kaine's win.

This is the most recent election in which the Governor and Lieutenant Governor of opposite parties were elected. This is the last gubernatorial election when Accomack County, Buchanan County, Fluvanna County, Henry County, King and Queen County, Nottoway County, Rappahannock County, Westmoreland County and the independent cities of Buena Vista and Lynchburg have voted Democratic for governor.

== Democratic primary ==
On March 16, 2005, Lieutenant Governor Tim Kaine formally launched his campaign for governor though he was widely anticipated as the frontrunner for the Democratic nomination before his official announcement. From July 1 to December 31, 2004, Kaine raised $2.1 million with $3.2 million to spend in the campaign. In addition, he received $1.5 million in financial support from the Democratic National Committee. He did not receive opposition in the primary, becoming the Democratic nominee by default.

=== Candidates ===
==== Nominee ====
- Tim Kaine, Lieutenant Governor of Virginia (2002-2006) and former mayor of Richmond (1998-2001)

== Republican primary ==
On January 17, 2005, Republican Jerry Kilgore announced he would resign from Attorney General to campaign for governor on February 1. From July 1 to December 31, 2004, Kilgore raised $2 million with $3.3 million to spend in the campaign. He launched his campaign with support for conservative economic and social policies.

On February 28, 2005, Warrenton mayor, George Fitch declared his candidacy for governor as the more conservative candidate — he promised to never raise taxes. Due to Republican support and fundraising advantages for Kilgore, Fitch was considered the underdog in the Republican primary.

On June 4, Kilgore easily defeated Fitch in the primary becoming the Republican nominee.

=== Candidates ===
==== Nominee ====
- Jerry Kilgore, former Attorney General of Virginia (2002-2005)

==== Eliminated in primary ====
- George Fitch, mayor of Warrenton (1998-2014)

=== Results ===
Republican primary results
Party	Candidate	Votes	%
Republican	Jerry Kilgore	145,002	82.78
Republican	George Fitch	30,168	17.22
Total votes		175,170	100.00

== Third Parties and Independents ==
=== Candidates ===
==== Independent Republican ====
- Russ Potts, state senator from Virginia's 27th district (Independent Republican)

== General election ==
Candidates

- Tim Kaine, lieutenant governor of Virginia and former mayor of Richmond (Democratic)
- Jerry Kilgore, former attorney general of Virginia (Republican)
- Russ Potts, state senator from Winchester (Independent Republican)

The general election was expected to be close, with Independent candidate Russ Potts as a possible spoiler candidate. Kaine remained behind in polls throughout most of the campaign, at one point 10 points behind Kilgore, but captured a slight lead in the final weeks of the campaign. Kaine led in some polls for the first time in October 2005 and held his lead into the final week before the election.

Kaine closely associated himself with popular outgoing Democratic Governor Mark Warner during his campaign; he won his race by a slightly larger margin than Warner. He promised homeowner tax relief, centrist fiscal leadership, and strong support for education. A number of factors, from the sagging poll numbers of President George W. Bush to a public disgust over the death penalty ads run by Kilgore, have also been cited as key to his decisive win.

The election was the most expensive in Virginia history, with the candidates combined raising over $42 million.

=== Campaign ===
Kilgore resigned as attorney general in February 2005 to run for governor (as is the convention in Virginia) and easily won the primary election against Warrenton Mayor George B. Fitch to become the Republican nominee. In the general election, he ran against Democratic nominee Tim Kaine, the lieutenant governor of Virginia, and State Senator Russ Potts, a pro-choice Republican who ran as an independent candidate. Early in the race, Kilgore showed solid leads of ten points or more in the polls, but Kaine steadily closed the gap and ultimately defeated Kilgore by a margin of 52% to 46%.

Kilgore's campaign was at times criticized for taking steps to avoid debates; Kilgore refused to debate Potts for the majority of the campaign, at times leaving Kaine and Potts to debate each other in his absence. He agreed to debate only with Kaine, and only if the footage could not be aired in campaign commercials. During this debate, he refused to answer whether or not he would make abortion a crime. This apparent public moderation of his previously open and hardline stance on abortion troubled some of his conservative supporters.

He was further criticized for failing to limit his negative advertisements to 50% of his campaign's total publicity as Kaine proposed. One such advertisement featured a father whose son had been murdered by a man who was on Virginia's death row; the father expressed doubt that the sentence would be carried out if Kaine were elected and alleged that Kaine would not even have authorized the execution of Adolf Hitler, based on an interview with the Richmond Times-Dispatch. The negative reaction to the mention of Hitler combined with Kaine's pledge to carry out the death penalty and explanation of his personal opposition as arising from his Catholic faith helped to neutralize what many observers thought would've been a potent issue for Kilgore. Kaine's campaign also ran an ad entitled "Wrong" quoting many Virginia newspapers in their condemnation of Kilgore and his campaign ads which stated (all caps emphasis) "All these newspapers can't be WRONG: 'Jerry Kilgore's ads are a VILE attempt to manipulate for political gain. . . they TWIST the truth. . . and SMEAR Tim Kaine. . . Kilgore's attacks are DISHONEST. . . FALSELY accuse Kaine. . . and TAR a decent man. . . Kilgore CROSSED the line. . . DRAGGING Kaine's beliefs through the mud. . . Jerry Kilgore should APOLOGIZE to Tim Kaine.'"

In trying to explain how a solid Republican could lose a traditionally Republican state by such a large margin, political commentators cited numerous key factors. Kaine's campaign had many political advantages, including his association with the state's popular Democratic Governor Mark Warner and defense of Warner's 2004 budget priorities, his "response ads" to Kilgore's death penalty advertisements where he spoke to voters about his religious convictions and as mentioned above, reminded them about how a large cross-section of Virginia media strongly condemned Kilgore for his negative death penalty ads, his relentless in-person campaigning across the state, and his opposition to tax increases. Experienced attorney Lawrence Roberts served as Kaine's campaign chairman. In contrast, Kilgore's campaign had many political disadvantages, including a backlash over the death penalty ads that Kilgore's campaign ran in the fall, the relatively low poll numbers of then-President George W. Bush at the time of the election, and a bitter division between the moderate and conservative wings of the Republican Party over tax and spending priorities.

=== Debates ===
- Complete video of first debate, September 13, 2005
- Complete video of second debate, October 9, 2005

=== Predictions ===
Source	Ranking	As of
Sabato's Crystal Ball	Tossup	October 25, 2005

=== Polling ===
Aggregate polls

Source of poll aggregation	Dates administered	Dates updated	Tim Kaine (D)	Jerry Kilgore (R)	Other/Undecided (Note: Calculated by taking the difference of 100% and all other candidates combined.)	Margin
Real Clear Politics	November 2–7, 2005	November 7, 2005	48.0%	45.0%	7% (Note: Potts with 3%.)	Kaine +3.0%

Poll source	Date(s) administered	Sample size (Note: Key: A – all adults RV – registered voters LV – likely voters V – unclear)	Margin of error	Tim Kaine (D)	Jerry Kilgore (R)	Russ Potts (I)	Other	Undecided
SurveyUSA (Note: Poll sponsored by WSLS-TV Roanoke and WUSA-TV Washington, DC)	November 5–7, 2005	804 (LV)	± 3.5%	50%	45%	3%	1%	1%
Mason-Dixon Polling & Strategies	November 2–3, 2005	625 (LV)	± 4.0%	45%	44%	4%	–	7%
Rasmussen Reports	November 2, 2005	500 (LV)	± 4.5%	49%	46%	2%	–	3%
Rasmussen Reports	October 27, 2005	500 (LV)	± 4.5%	46%	44%	4%	–	6%
Roanoke College	October 22–30, 2005	407 (LV)	± 5.0%	44%	36%	5%	–	15%
The Washington Post	October 23–26, 2005	1,004 (LV)	± 3.0%	47%	44%	4%	–	5%
Rasmussen Reports	October 20, 2005	500 (LV)	± 4.5%	46%	48%	2%	–	4%
Mason-Dixon Polling & Strategy	October 18–20, 2005	625 (LV)	± 4.0%	42%	44%	5%	–	9%
SurveyUSA	October 14–16, 2005	750 (LV)	± 3.7%	47%	45%	4%	2%	2%
Financial Dynamics (Note: Poll sponsored by The Hotline/Diageo)	October 13–16, 2005	500 (RV)	± 4.4%	40%	38%	5%	–	17%
Financial Dynamics	October 13–16, 2005	321 (LV)	± 5.6%	41%	40%	5%	–	14%
Rasmussen Reports	October 10–11, 2005	500 (LV)	± 4.5%	44%	46%	1%	–	9%
Rasmussen Reports	September 28, 2005	500 (LV)	± 4.5%	45%	45%	5%	–	5%
SurveyUSA	September 16–18, 2005	636 (LV)	± 4.0%	43%	46%	4%	3%	4%
Mason-Dixon Polling & Strategy	September 13–15, 2005	625 (LV)	± 4.0%	40%	41%	6%	–	13%
Rasmussen Reports	September 14, 2005	500 (LV)	± 4.5%	41%	44%	–	5%	10%
Rasmussen Reports	September 14, 2005	500 (LV)	± 4.5%	40%	43%	5%	2%	10%
The Washington Post	September 6–9, 2005	1,036 (RV)	± 3.0%	41%	45%	5%	–	9%
The Washington Post	September 6–9, 2005	571 (LV)	± 4.0%	44%	51%	4%	–	1%
SurveyUSA	August 6–8, 2005	568 (LV)	± 4.2%	43%	48%	3%	3%	4%
Rasmussen Reports	August 3, 2005	500 (LV)	± 4.5%	39%	45%	–	5%	11%
Mason-Dixon Polling & Strategy	July 19–21, 2005	625 (LV)	± 4.0%	38%	37%	9%	–	16%
Rasmussen Reports	July 12, 2005	500 (LV)	± 4.5%	41%	47%	–	4%	8%
SurveyUSA	June 28–29, 2005	494 (LV)	± 4.5%	39%	49%	5%	3%	7%
Rasmussen Reports	June 15, 2005	500 (LV)	± 4.5%	40%	46%	–	2%	12%
SurveyUSA	May 15–16, 2005	575 (RV)	± 4.2%	40%	44%	–	5%	11%
Rasmussen Reports	April 14, 2005	500 (LV)	± 4.5%	36%	44%	–	5%	15%

=== Results ===
Virginia gubernatorial election, 2005
Party	Candidate	Votes	%	±%
Democratic	Tim Kaine	1,025,942	51.72%	−0.44%
Republican	Jerry Kilgore	912,327	45.99%	−1.04%
Independent	Russ Potts	43,953	2.22%	
Write-in		1,556	0.08%	+0.04%
Majority		113,615	5.73%	+0.60%
Turnout		1,983,778	44.96%	−1.4%
Democratic hold		Swing		

==== Results by county and independent city ====
County	Kaine	Votes	Kilgore	Votes	Potts	Votes	Others	Votes
Accomack	49.8%	3,860	48.5%	3,754	1.6%	126	0.1%	5
Albemarle	61.2%	18,455	36.4%	10,994	2.4%	711	0.0%	14
Alexandria	71.9%	25,061	26.3%	9,173	1.7%	605	0.1%	25
Alleghany	53.9%	2,907	44.0%	2,373	2.1%	115	0.0%	2
Amelia	37.0%	1,368	60.9%	2,251	2.0%	74	0.1%	3
Amherst	43.6%	3,576	54.2%	4,450	2.1%	175	0.0%	4
Appomattox	39.5%	1,804	58.3%	2,663	2.2%	99	0.1%	4
Arlington	74.3%	42,319	23.9%	13,631	1.7%	990	0.1%	49
Augusta	33.1%	6,395	63.1%	12,197	3.7%	721	0.1%	12
Bath	45.1%	729	53.2%	860	1.6%	26	0.1%	2
Bedford County	37.1%	7,524	60.8%	12,330	2.1%	420	0.1%	14
Bedford	49.1%	892	48.2%	877	2.6%	47	0.1%	2
Bland	36.8%	706	61.4%	1,176	1.8%	34	0.0%	0
Botetourt	39.4%	4,083	58.4%	6,053	2.2%	227	0.1%	10
Bristol	37.8%	1,548	61.5%	2,515	0.7%	27	0.0%	1
Brunswick	60.3%	2,691	39.0%	1,742	0.7%	31	0.0%	2
Buchanan	52.2%	3,171	47.3%	2,875	0.4%	27	0.1%	4
Buckingham	47.9%	1,822	50.0%	1,899	2.1%	80	0.0%	0
Buena Vista	51.9%	799	46.3%	713	1.8%	28	0.0%	0
Campbell	36.8%	5,319	61.3%	8,864	1.8%	264	0.1%	15
Caroline	53.7%	3,396	44.0%	2,786	2.2%	142	0.0%	1
Carroll	38.9%	2,942	59.2%	4,485	1.9%	143	0.0%	1
Charles City	69.1%	1,565	29.6%	671	1.3%	29	0.0%	0
Charlotte	43.2%	1,637	54.9%	2,078	1.8%	69	0.1%	2
Charlottesville	79.4%	8,018	18.5%	1,870	2.0%	205	0.1%	11
Chesapeake	50.3%	26,612	47.1%	24,885	2.6%	1,357	0.1%	34
Chesterfield	44.7%	40,134	53.6%	48,112	1.7%	1,484	0.1%	81
Clarke	45.0%	2,225	47.6%	2,350	7.3%	363	0.1%	4
Colonial Heights	29.4%	1,777	68.2%	4,116	2.4%	143	0.0%	2
Covington	61.5%	1,022	35.3%	587	3.2%	53	0.0%	0
Craig	42.4%	754	54.8%	975	2.7%	48	0.2%	3
Culpeper	38.0%	3,689	59.4%	5,762	2.5%	242	0.1%	5
Cumberland	43.8%	1,144	54.3%	1,420	1.9%	50	0.0%	0
Danville	53.3%	6,052	45.6%	5,177	1.0%	119	0.0%	2
Dickenson	48.0%	2,377	51.6%	2,559	0.4%	18	0.1%	3
Dinwiddie	46.4%	3,168	51.6%	3,523	1.9%	131	0.1%	4
Emporia	48.6%	796	49.8%	815	1.6%	26	0.0%	0
Essex	48.7%	1,500	49.8%	1,533	1.5%	45	0.0%	0
Fairfax County	60.1%	163,667	38.0%	103,285	1.8%	4,907	0.1%	241
Fairfax	57.2%	3,865	40.7%	2,750	2.0%	132	0.1%	9
Falls Church	72.5%	3,138	25.5%	1,102	1.8%	77	0.2%	10
Fauquier	43.4%	7,746	53.3%	9,505	3.2%	576	0.1%	20
Floyd	44.4%	1,959	52.7%	2,324	2.9%	129	0.0%	0
Fluvanna	49.7%	3,592	47.8%	3,456	2.5%	178	0.0%	1
Franklin County	44.9%	7,017	52.2%	8,157	2.8%	441	0.0%	3
Franklin	57.5%	1,394	40.8%	988	1.7%	41	0.0%	0
Frederick	33.7%	6,027	59.8%	10,698	6.3%	1,125	0.1%	26
Fredericksburg	60.8%	2,611	36.4%	1,561	2.7%	118	0.1%	4
Galax	50.0%	730	47.5%	693	2.5%	36	0.0%	0
Giles	49.3%	2,570	48.1%	2,507	2.5%	132	0.1%	5
Gloucester	39.6%	3,985	56.6%	5,688	3.7%	373	0.1%	12
Goochland	42.4%	3,292	55.6%	4,313	1.9%	146	0.1%	5
Grayson	40.3%	1,875	58.3%	2,710	1.4%	66	0.0%	0
Greene	41.1%	1,846	56.3%	2,526	2.6%	115	0.0%	1
Greensville	55.8%	1,833	43.4%	1,424	0.8%	25	0.0%	1
Halifax	43.8%	3,931	54.5%	4,887	1.7%	149	0.1%	5
Hampton	63.8%	20,961	33.7%	11,078	2.5%	814	0.1%	25
Hanover	36.3%	12,784	61.5%	21,637	2.2%	770	0.1%	19
Harrisonburg	51.0%	3,539	46.8%	3,251	2.0%	138	0.2%	12
Henrico	53.2%	49,170	45.1%	41,619	1.6%	1,492	0.1%	78
Henry	50.8%	7,454	47.8%	7,004	1.4%	198	0.0%	3
Highland	39.5%	478	57.8%	700	2.6%	32	0.1%	1
Hopewell	45.1%	2,300	53.0%	2,705	1.8%	90	0.1%	4
Isle of Wight	45.7%	4,664	51.5%	5,262	2.8%	285	0.0%	4
James City	48.5%	10,205	48.0%	10,104	3.3%	704	0.1%	16
King and Queen	54.3%	1,114	43.7%	896	2.0%	40	0.0%	1
King George	43.0%	2,042	54.1%	2,569	2.8%	133	0.1%	5
King William	42.7%	1,951	54.9%	2,509	2.4%	108	0.0%	2
Lancaster	44.2%	2,043	53.3%	2,463	2.4%	113	0.1%	6
Lee	34.4%	2,453	65.0%	4,640	0.6%	42	0.0%	0
Lexington	64.6%	1,097	33.4%	567	1.9%	33	0.0%	0
Loudoun	51.6%	31,074	45.8%	27,539	2.5%	1,501	0.1%	65
Louisa	45.9%	3,716	51.7%	4,179	2.4%	193	0.0%	2
Lunenburg	45.3%	1,490	53.2%	1,749	1.5%	48	0.1%	2
Lynchburg	50.9%	8,329	47.1%	7,708	1.9%	308	0.2%	27
Madison	43.2%	1,672	54.4%	2,105	2.3%	90	0.1%	4
Manassas	46.2%	3,167	51.6%	3,532	2.1%	147	0.1%	4
Manassas Park	45.7%	650	52.8%	751	1.4%	20	0.1%	2
Martinsville	62.4%	2,363	36.4%	1,380	1.1%	43	0.1%	2
Mathews	40.7%	1,452	54.5%	1,946	4.8%	170	0.0%	0
Mecklenburg	42.8%	2,986	55.4%	3,864	1.9%	131	0.0%	0
Middlesex	40.2%	1,530	57.0%	2,167	2.7%	104	0.0%	1
Montgomery	55.4%	11,509	41.8%	8,670	2.7%	560	0.1%	19
Nelson	55.4%	2,755	42.5%	2,113	2.1%	102	0.0%	2
New Kent	40.4%	2,241	57.3%	3,179	2.3%	127	0.0%	2
Newport News	57.4%	21,743	39.9%	15,095	2.6%	992	0.1%	42
Norfolk	66.1%	27,791	30.7%	12,899	3.1%	1,290	0.1%	50
Northampton	60.8%	2,058	37.1%	1,256	2.2%	73	0.0%	0
Northumberland	44.3%	2,104	53.6%	2,548	2.0%	95	0.1%	6
Norton	44.9%	449	54.0%	539	1.1%	11	0.0%	0
Nottoway	49.9%	1,993	48.6%	1,942	1.5%	59	0.0%	0
Orange	45.5%	3,888	52.4%	4,481	2.1%	182	0.0%	0
Page	38.7%	2,385	58.2%	3,591	3.0%	185	0.1%	4
Patrick	41.7%	2,111	56.4%	2,853	1.8%	93	0.1%	4
Petersburg	81.8%	5,995	17.4%	1,274	0.8%	59	0.0%	2
Pittsylvania	37.7%	6,363	60.8%	10,252	1.5%	250	0.0%	6
Poquoson	34.2%	1,383	62.2%	2,515	3.5%	143	0.1%	3
Portsmouth	65.7%	16,314	31.9%	7,926	2.3%	560	0.1%	17
Powhatan	32.3%	2,744	65.6%	5,580	2.0%	170	0.1%	6
Prince Edward	52.1%	2,546	46.2%	2,259	1.7%	85	0.0%	1
Prince George	40.9%	3,382	57.5%	4,751	1.6%	130	0.0%	3
Prince William	49.9%	33,364	48.2%	32,178	1.8%	1,220	0.1%	35
Pulaski	46.5%	4,427	51.4%	4,901	2.1%	199	0.0%	0
Radford	54.2%	1,928	43.1%	1,534	2.6%	94	0.1%	2
Rappahannock	51.1%	1,397	47.0%	1,283	1.8%	50	0.1%	2
Richmond County	39.3%	863	58.8%	1,293	1.9%	42	0.0%	0
Richmond	75.9%	38,900	22.5%	11,529	1.5%	769	0.1%	40
Roanoke County	44.7%	14,125	52.8%	16,686	2.4%	755	0.1%	29
Roanoke	61.8%	14,207	35.9%	8,239	2.2%	505	0.1%	21
Rockbridge	46.1%	2,993	51.6%	3,354	2.2%	142	0.1%	5
Rockingham	32.4%	6,560	65.5%	13,262	2.0%	404	0.1%	19
Russell	43.9%	3,431	55.2%	4,314	0.9%	69	0.0%	0
Salem	47.1%	3,788	49.7%	3,993	3.0%	242	0.1%	12
Scott	26.2%	2,156	73.2%	6,016	0.5%	43	0.0%	0
Shenandoah	32.4%	3,996	63.9%	7,874	3.6%	438	0.1%	12
Smyth	36.7%	2,989	62.1%	5,053	1.1%	91	0.0%	2
Southampton	49.8%	2,442	48.0%	2,354	2.2%	110	0.0%	1
Spotsylvania	43.8%	11,061	54.0%	13,635	2.1%	533	0.2%	38
Stafford	43.6%	10,924	54.1%	13,559	2.2%	564	0.1%	28
Staunton	50.0%	3,384	46.0%	3,112	4.0%	270	0.0%	3
Suffolk	53.7%	10,480	43.9%	8,561	2.3%	456	0.1%	12
Surry	60.7%	1,480	37.7%	919	1.5%	37	0.1%	3
Sussex	54.5%	1,739	43.9%	1,401	1.5%	48	0.0%	0
Tazewell	40.8%	4,194	58.1%	5,970	1.0%	106	0.0%	4
Virginia Beach	48.6%	47,120	48.0%	46,471	3.3%	3,178	0.1%	120
Warren	40.3%	3,408	55.7%	4,705	3.9%	329	0.1%	9
Washington	33.9%	5,188	65.4%	10,009	0.7%	108	0.0%	5
Waynesboro	44.5%	2,223	51.9%	2,596	3.6%	181	0.0%	0
Westmoreland	52.3%	2,219	45.4%	1,924	2.2%	93	0.1%	3
Williamsburg	60.5%	1,782	36.7%	1,081	2.7%	80	0.0%	1
Winchester	45.1%	2,683	42.0%	2,497	12.8%	763	0.1%	8
Wise	38.2%	3,871	61.2%	6,190	0.6%	56	0.0%	5
Wythe	37.8%	3,125	59.9%	4,954	2.2%	185	0.1%	5
York	44.4%	8,142	52.1%	9,565	3.4%	620	0.1%	16

==== Counties and independent cities that flipped from Republican to Democratic ====
- James City (no municipalities)
- Rappahannock (largest city: Washington)
- Virginia Beach (independent city)
- Chesapeake (independent city)
- Harrisonburg (independent city)
- Prince William (largest borough: Manassas)
- Staunton (independent city)
- Loudoun (largest borough: Leesburg)
- Fluvanna (largest borough: Lake Monticello)

==== Counties and independent cities that flipped from Democratic to Republican ====
- Appomattox (largest city: Appomattox)
- Amherst (largest city: Amherst)
- Bath (largest city: Hot Springs)
- Buckingham (largest city: Dillwyn)
- Charlotte (largest city: Keysville)
- Craig (largest city: New Castle)
- Cumberland (largest city: Farmville)
- Dickenson (largest borough: Clintwood)
- Dinwiddie (largest town: McKenney)
- Essex (largest city: Tappahannock)
- Emporia (independent city)
- Franklin (largest city: Rocky Mount)
- Halifax (largest city: South Boston)
- Hopewell (independent city)
- Isle of Wight (largest city: Smithfield)
- Norton (independent city)
- Salem (independent city)
- Louisa (largest city: Louisa)
- Lunenburg (largest city: Victoria)
- Lee (largest city: Pennington Gap)
- Northumberland (largest city: Heathsville)
- Pulaski (largest city: Pulaski)
- Russell (largest municipality: Lebanon)
- Rockbridge (largest city: Lexington)
- Smyth (largest city: Marion)
- Tazewell (largest city: Richlands)
- Wise (largest city: Big Stone Gap)

== Analysis ==
In the 2001 gubernatorial election, Mark Warner was accredited with strong performances in rural areas of the commonwealth which saw some reversions to Jerry Kilgore in this election. Kaine made heavy attempts to appeal to suburban and exurban counties in Northern Virginia where President Bush did strongly in 2004 through campaigning with Governor Warner and supporting zoning laws.

== See also ==
- Commonwealth of Virginia
- List of governors of Virginia

== Notes ==
Partisan clients
