= William Truban =

American politician (1924–2007)

William A. Truban
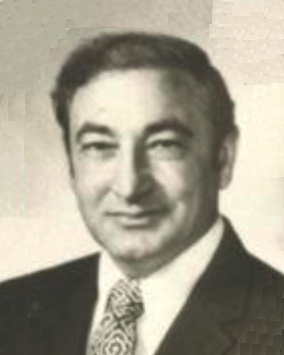

Member of the Virginia Senate
- In office January 6, 1971 – January 8, 1992
- Preceded by: J. Kenneth Robinson
- Succeeded by: Russ Potts
- Constituency: 21st district (1971–1972); 27th district (1972–1992)

Personal details
- Born: William Andonia Truban; October 6, 1924 Gorman, Maryland, U.S.
- Died: February 3, 2007 (aged 82) Woodstock, Virginia, U.S.
- Party: Republican
- Spouse: Mildred Jean Hayes
- Children: 6
- Education: West Virginia Wesleyan College (BS); University of Pennsylvania School of Veterinary Medicine (VMD)
- Occupation: Veterinarian; farmer

Military service
- Branch/service: United States Army; Army Air Forces
- Battles/wars: World War II; Pacific theater
- Awards: Bronze Star Medal (3)

William Andonia Truban (October 6, 1924 – February 3, 2007) was an American veterinarian and politician who served more than two decades as a Republican in the Virginia Senate, representing Shenandoah, Clarke, Frederick and Loudoun Counties and the city of Winchester, Virginia, and sometimes Fauquier and Warren counties as well. Dr. Truban was then Senate minority leader of what was then a small party as the Byrd Organization disintegrated.

== Early life ==
William Truban was born in the unincorporated town of Gormania in Garrett County, Maryland on October 6, 1924, to Joseph Truban and his wife May Parks. He was single and classified as a gardener or groundskeeper when he registered for the draft upon turning 18. Truban was inducted into the U.S. Army in Baltimore, Maryland, on March 15, 1943. He served in the U.S. Army Air Force in the Asian Theater during World War II,

He used the G.I. Bill at West Virginia Wesleyan College in Buckhannon, West Virginia from which he received a bachelor's degree. He earned his veterinary degree (V.M.D.) from the University of Pennsylvania School of Veterinary Medicine in Philadelphia, Pennsylvania. He married Mildred Jean Hayes and was a member of the United Methodist Church.

== Career ==
Truban established Shenandoah Animal Hospital in Woodstock, Shenandoah County, Virginia and was active in the Veterinary Medical Association as well as the Woodstock Rotary Club. His son Thomas S. Truban later took over the veterinary practice.

== Political career ==
Truban won a special election in 1970 after J. Kenneth Robinson, who had represented the then-rural 27th District in the Virginia Senate as a Republican, won election to the U.S. House of Representatives. Dr. Truban won 61% of the votes cast in that election and handily defeated Democrat Robert Smalley. Four years later, he defeated Democrat Thelma T. Ore by a similar margin, although in 1979 Truban won re-election with a mere 56.9% of votes cast while running against Democrat Donald W. Patterson Jr. Dr. Truban faced no opposition in his 1983 nor 1987 campaigns for re-election and announced his retirement before the 1991 primary.

Dr. Truban served as the sole Republican on the Senate Finance Committee and as Senate minority leader until November 1991. While he was the Republican floor leader, his party held no more than 10 of the Senate's 40 seats; Republicans later became the majority party. Dr. Truban helped establish a veterinary school at Virginia Tech, which became the Virginia-Maryland Regional College of Veterinary Medicine. A fiscal conservative as had been both his long-serving predecessor Democrats Harry F. Byrd Sr. and Harry F. Byrd Jr., Truban sat on the Joint Legislative Audit and Review Commission (JLARC) which in 1990 proposed establishing a state cash reserve to protect Virginia's bond rating and keep the state on firm financial footing during economic downturns. Although the proposal initially failed, voters ratified the Virginia Revenue Stabilization Fund, better known as the rainy-day fund, in 1992, and it became law in 1993.

== Later years ==
Truban continued his veterinary practice, but when health issues accumulated, he entered an assisted living facility in Woodstock, Virginia. There he died on February 3, 2007, survived by his widow and six children, as well as grandchildren. One of his sons, William A. Truban Jr., became a lawyer and established legal practice specializing in elder law.

Senate of Virginia
Preceded by J. Kenneth Robinson	Virginia Senate, District 27; 1971–1992	Succeeded by Russ Potts
