= Jill Vogel =

American politician (born 1970)

Jill Holtzman Vogel
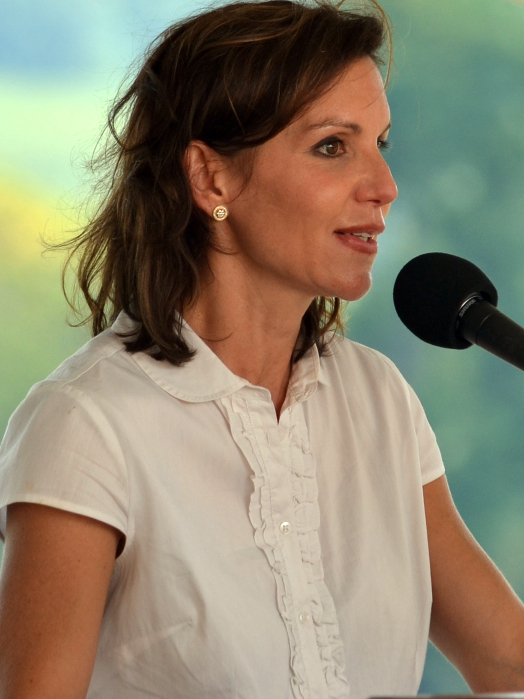

Member of the Virginia Senate from the 27th district
- In office January 9, 2008 – January 10, 2024
- Preceded by: Russ Potts
- Succeeded by: Russet Perry (Redistricting)

Personal details
- Born: Jill Kendrick Holtzman; July 6, 1970 (age 56) Roanoke, Virginia, U.S.
- Party: Republican
- Spouse: Alex Vogel
- Education: College of William and Mary (BA); DePaul University (JD)
- Website: Official website

Jill Kendrick Holtzman Vogel (née Holtzman; born July 6, 1970) is an American attorney and politician who served as the Virginia State Senator from the 27th district from 2008 to 2024. A Republican, her district was located in exurban and rural parts of Northern Virginia, and it included all of Clarke, Fauquier, and Frederick counties, Winchester city, as well as pieces of Culpeper, Loudoun, and Stafford counties.

== Early and family life ==
Born in Roanoke, Virginia, Vogel's family started a small business, Holtzman Oil Company, which eventually grew into an enterprise employing over 600 people in Virginia. Vogel attended the College of William and Mary in Williamsburg, Virginia, and received a B.A. degree in government and religion. She then attended DePaul University's Law School in Chicago, Illinois, and received a J.D. degree.

== Political career ==
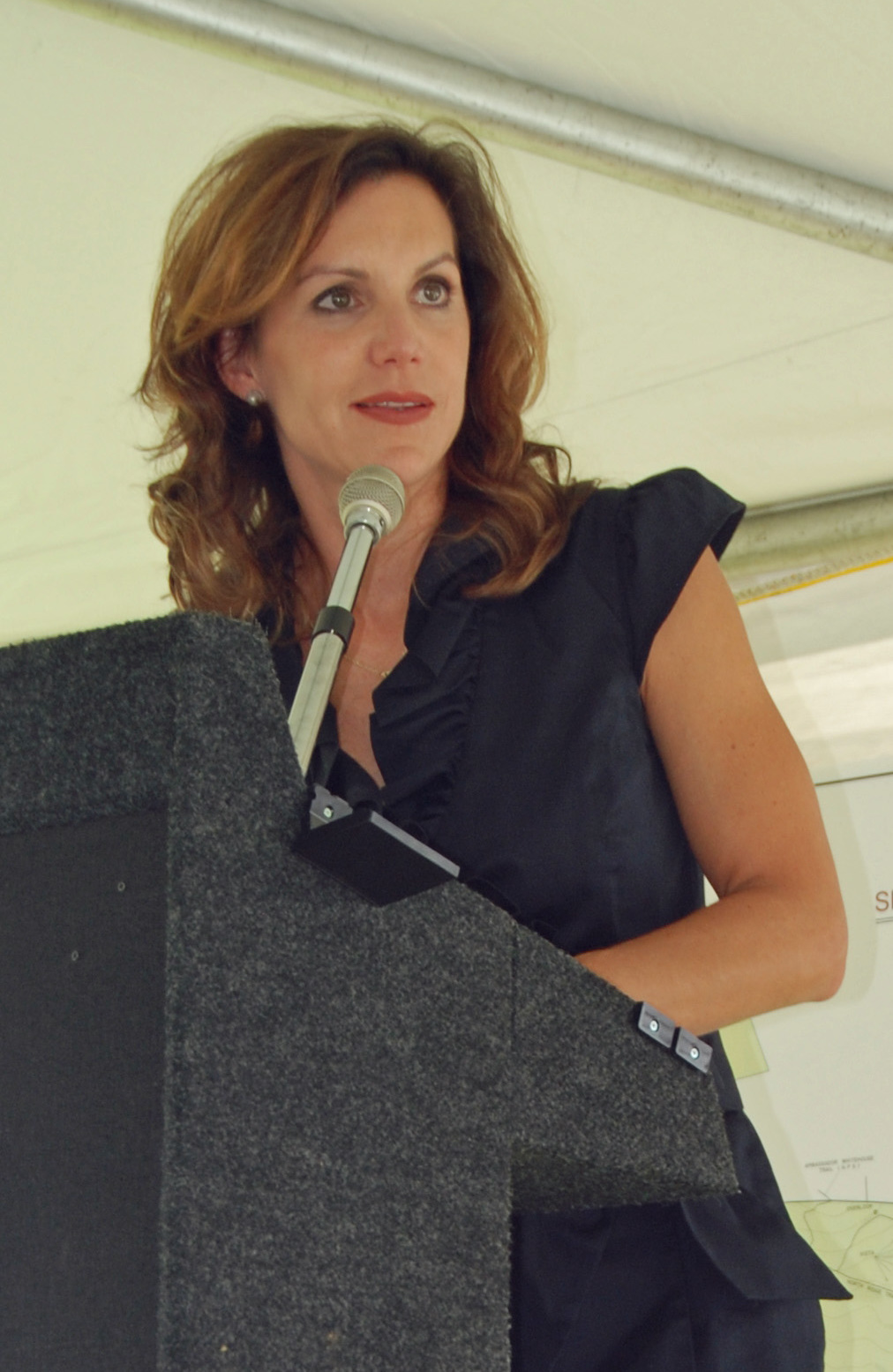
Vogel in 2013

A member of the Virginia and Washington D.C. bars, Vogel did legal work for charitable and nonprofit organizations, as well as campaign finance and ethics. Vogel served as Deputy General Counsel in the Department of Energy, before starting her own law firm, Holtzman Vogel Josefiak Torchinsky. Vogel became the Chief Counsel of the Republican National Committee in February 2004. Previously, she had been Deputy Chief Counsel, and was involved in the 2000 Florida recount and as a staff counsel at the 1996 Republican National Convention.

She was elected to the Senate of Virginia as a Republican in 2007, after long-term state senator Russ Potts retired. She represents much of the territory that was once represented by former Governor and U. S. Senator Harry F. Byrd Sr. and former U. S. Senator Harry F. Byrd Jr. It was one of the first areas of Virginia to turn Republican; the GOP has held the seat without interruption since Harry Jr.'s appointment to the U. S. Senate in 1965.

Vogel faced a contentious race in 2007, winning by only 661 votes over Winchester School Board Trustee Karen Schultz as the Democrats regained control of the Senate. She was re-elected by a wider margin in 2011.

In 2015, Vogel's candidacy for reelection was unopposed. She became the Caucus Whip for the Republican party in the state Senate.

In 2017, after an unusually bitter primary battle, Vogel became the Republican nominee for Lieutenant Governor of Virginia in 2017. She lost to Democrat Justin Fairfax in the general election on November 7, 2017.

In 2019 Vogel was reelected to the Virginia State Senate. Also in 2019, Vogel was presented with the Legislator of the Year award from the Virginia Professional Fire Fighters organization.

In December 2021, The Daily Beast reported that Vogel had done substantial work for Kanye West's 2020 presidential campaign as part of a larger astroturfing effort by the Republican Party on behalf of West's candidacy.

== Policy positions ==
=== Abortion ===
In 2012, Vogel attracted nationwide media attention for a bill she introduced requiring abortion clinics to administer transvaginal ultrasounds, which she described as necessary for fully informed consent.

=== Gun rights ===
In 2016, she introduced legislation to allow victims of domestic violence to more easily and quickly obtain concealed weapons permits.

=== Child marriage ===
In 2016, she also gained nationwide media attention for helping repeal laws that allowed "child marriage" involving pregnant minors.

=== Redistricting reform ===
In 2017, she sought to curb gerrymandering by introducing a bill establishing more specific criteria for redistricting in Virginia. She also introduced legislation to legalize medicinal use of non-psychoactive cannabis oils for a range of conditions.

=== LGBT rights ===
In the January 2020 session of the legislature, Vogel was the only Republican in the Senate who voted in favor of a ban on conversion therapy. In the same session, Vogel also voted in favor of a bill which would make it easier for transgender Virginians to change the sex listed on their birth certificates and a bill which would repeal Virginia's defunct ban on same-sex marriage.

== Electoral history ==
Date	Election	Candidate	Party	Votes	%
Virginia Senate, 27th district
June 12, 2007	Primary	Jill H. Vogel	Republican	3,778	54.0%
June 12, 2007	Primary	Mark D. Tate	Republican	2,022	28.9%
June 12, 2007	Primary	Terrence L. Nyhous	Republican	654	9.3%
June 12, 2007	Primary	Richard W. Robinson	Republican	548	7.8%
Nov 6, 2007	General	Jill H. Vogel	Republican	24,960	48.4%
Nov 6, 2007	General	Karen K. Schultz	Democratic	24,301	47.2%
Nov 6, 2007	General	Donald C. Marro	Independent	2,170	4.2%
Nov 6, 2007	General	Write Ins		90	0.2
Nov 8, 2011	General	Jill H. Vogel	Republican	24,555	74.6%
Nov 8, 2011	General	Shaun D. Broy	Democratic	7,616	23.2%
Nov 8, 2011	General	Donald C. Marro	Independent	681	2.1%
Nov 8, 2011	General	Write Ins		12	0.1
Nov 3, 2015	General	Jill H. Vogel	Republican	34,203	100.0%
Nov 3, 2015	General	Write Ins		964	2.7
Nov 5, 2019	General	Jill H. Vogel	Republican	43,406	64.21
Nov 5, 2019	General	Ronnie Ross	Democratic	24,128	35.69
Nov 5, 2019	General	Write Ins		65	0.10
Virginia Lieutenant Governor
June 13, 2017	Primary	Jill H. Vogel	Republican	151,880	42.8%
June 13, 2017	Primary	Bryce Reeves	Republican	141,888	40.0%
June 13, 2017	Primary	Glenn Davis	Republican	60,998	17.2%
Nov 7, 2017	General	Justin E. Fairfax	Democratic	1,368,261	52.7%
Nov 7, 2017	General	Jill H. Vogel	Republican	1,224,519	47.2%
Nov 7, 2017	General	Write Ins		2,446	0.1%

Senate of Virginia
Preceded by Russ Potts	Member of the Virginia Senate from the 27th district 2008–2024	Succeeded by Tara Durant
Party political offices
Preceded by E. W. Jackson	Republican nominee for Lieutenant Governor of Virginia; 2017	Succeeded by Winsome Earle-Sears
