= J. Kenneth Robinson =

American politician (1916–1990)

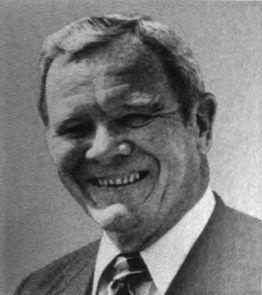

Member of the U.S. House of Representatives from Virginia's 7th district
- In office January 3, 1971 – January 3, 1985
- Preceded by: John O. Marsh Jr.
- Succeeded by: D. French Slaughter Jr.

Member of the Virginia Senate from the 21st district
- In office January 12, 1966 – January 3, 1971
- Preceded by: Harry F. Byrd Jr. (redistricting)
- Succeeded by: William Truban

Personal details
- Born: James Kenneth Robinson; May 14, 1916 Winchester, Virginia, U.S.
- Died: April 8, 1990 (aged 73) Winchester, Virginia, U.S.
- Party: Republican
- Spouse: Kathryn M. Rankin
- Children: 7
- Education: Virginia Tech (BS)
- Occupation: Businessman; politician; orchardist

Military service
- Allegiance: United States
- Branch/service: United States Army
- Years of service: 1941–1945
- Rank: Major
- Battles/wars: World War II

James Kenneth Robinson (May 14, 1916 – April 8, 1990) was a state senator and U.S. representative from Virginia.

== Early life ==
Born on May 14, 1916 in Winchester, Virginia, Robinson attended the city's public schools, including Handley High School. He graduated with a B.S. in horticulture from Virginia Polytechnic Institute, Blacksburg, Virginia in 1937. He served as infantryman in the United States Army from 1941 to 1945. He was discharged with the rank of major, and was active in the American Legion despite his Quaker faith.

== Career ==
Like the powerful Democratic Byrd family of Winchester, Robinson owned a fruit orchard and operated a fruit packing business, and had real estate and other business interests in the Winchester area. He and Harry F. Byrd Jr. were both pages in the court of the Queen of the Shenandoah Apple Blossom Festival long before Robinson served as the organization's president, and he also was an instructor in the on-the-farm training program for returning veterans. Robinson was also active in the Winchester Rotary Club, Izaak Walton League, Virginia Farm Bureau Federation, Boy Scouts, Winchester-Frederick County Chamber of Commerce and the Winchester Elks Lodge.

== Political career ==
Robinson made his first bid for elected office in 1962, when he ran as a Republican in Virginia's 7th congressional district, which included his home in Winchester. This district, like most of Virginia, had long been dominated by the Byrd Machine; indeed, machine patriarch Harry F. Byrd Sr. was a Winchester native. However, Robinson nearly ended the long run of Democratic dominance in this seat, coming within 598 votes of defeating the Democratic nominee, John Marsh. By this time, conservative Byrd Democrats had begun splitting their tickets in national contests out of chagrin over the New Deal as early as the 1930s, a trend that accelerated with the national party's embrace of civil rights for blacks.

After redistricting following the Civil Rights Act of 1964 and the U.S. Supreme Court decision in Davis v. Mann as well as Virginia Governor Albertis Harrison's appointment of state Senator Harry F. Byrd Jr. to succeed his retiring father in the U.S. Senate, voters in Byrd's long-held state senatorial district encompassing Clarke, Frederick and Shenandoah Counties and the City of Winchester (previously numbered the 24th (with the new addition of Loudoun County now numbered the 21st) elected Robinson to the Virginia Senate in 1965. He was re-elected to a four-year term in 1967. Robinson served as chairman of the Republican delegation to the 1968 and 1969 general assembly.

After Marsh opted not to run for a fifth term in 1970, Robinson entered the race to succeed him in 1970. His state senate district covered much of the congressional district's western portion. He defeated the former ambassador to El Salvador, Murat W. Williams, by a decisive margin. He defeated Williams in a rematch in 1972, becoming the first Republican to win a second term in this district since Reconstruction. He served as the ranking minority member on the Permanent Select Committee on Intelligence by the time he stepped down in January 1985.

Robinson became very popular in his district, even though many of its living residents had never been represented by a Republican before. After his first run for Congress, he only dropped below 60 percent of the vote once, in 1974 when a number of Republicans were unseated due to anger over the Watergate Scandal.

He did not seek an eighth term in 1984 due to ill health. He continued work in the fruit growing and packing business in Winchester until his death.

== Death and legacy ==
Robinson died from pancreatic cancer on April 8, 1990. Winchester's main post office is named in his honor, as is a bridge built in 1968, and a section of Virginia State Route 27 in Frederick County.

== Electoral history ==
1970;Robinson was elected to the U.S. House of Representatives with 61.75% of the vote, defeating Democrat Murat Williams.

- 1972; Robinson was re-elected with 66.18% of the vote, defeating Democrat Williams.
- 1974; Robinson was re-elected with 52.64% of the vote, defeating Democrat George H. Gilliam.
- 1976; Robinson was re-elected with 81.78% of the vote, defeating Independent James R. Hutt.
- 1978; Robinson was re-elected with 64.29% of the vote, defeating Democrat Lewis Perley Fickett Jr.
- 1980; Robinson was re-elected unopposed.
- 1982; Robinson was re-elected with 62.27% of the vote, defeating Democrat Lindsay G. Dorrier.

Senate of Virginia
Preceded by Curry Carter	Virginia Senator for the 21st District; 1966–1971	Succeeded by William Truban
U.S. House of Representatives
Preceded by John O. Marsh Jr.	Member of the U.S. House of Representatives from Virginia's 7th congressional district 1971–1985	Succeeded by D. French Slaughter Jr.
