= Russ Potts =

American politician (1939–2021)

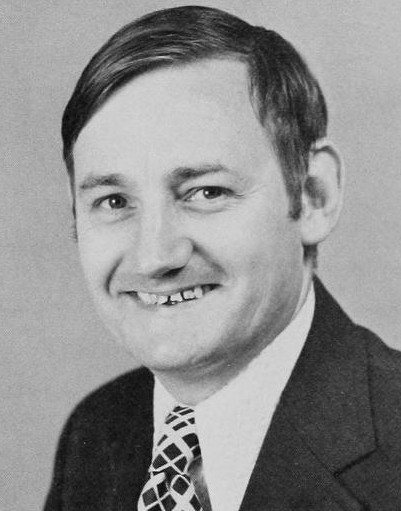

Member of the Virginia Senate from the 27th district
- In office January 8, 1992 – January 9, 2008
- Preceded by: William Truban
- Succeeded by: Jill Vogel

Personal details
- Born: Harry Russell Potts Jr. March 4, 1939 Richmond, Virginia, U.S.
- Died: December 19, 2021 (aged 82) Winchester, Virginia, U.S.
- Party: Republican
- Spouse: Emily Strite (m. 1965)
- Children: 3
- Education: University of Maryland
- Profession: Businessman; newspaper editor
- Website: http://www.rppi.net/

Harry Russell Potts Jr. (March 4, 1939 – December 19, 2021) was an American businessman, journalist, and politician who served as a Republican state senator in Virginia, representing the 27th district from 1992 to 2008. An independent candidate for Governor of Virginia in 2005, Potts received 2.22 percent of the vote in a race won by Democrat Tim Kaine, far below the votes received by Republican Jerry Kilgore. Following backlash within the Republican Party from his 2005 independent candidacy, Potts retired from the state senate at the following election.

== Early life ==
Born in Richmond, Virginia on March 4, 1939, Potts graduated from the University of Maryland with a major in journalism and a minor in political science. Potts served in the U.S. Army Reserves (1958–64).

== Career ==
A former sports editor for the Winchester Star, Potts held various athletic management and marketing positions with the University of Maryland and Southern Methodist University. He was also once vice president of the Chicago White Sox. In 1982, he founded Russ Potts Productions Inc., a small business in sports marketing. The company claims to have promoted many of the biggest and most successful independent sporting events in North America in the past four decades, as well as worked with various collegiate teams, Major League Baseball and the National Basketball Association. Potts has been inducted into the Virginia Sports Hall of Fame, NACMA Hall of Fame (National Association of College Marketing Administrators), Shenandoah University Hall of Fame, Potomac State College of West Virginia University Hall of Fame, John Handley High School Hall of Fame and the Phi Delta Theta Hall of Fame.

== Politics ==
First elected to the Virginia General Assembly in 1991 as a Republican, Potts received 49.6% of the vote in a four-candidate race. He was re-elected by large margins in 1995 and 1999, the latter year only facing a challenger (Mark D. Tate) in the Republican primary. In 2003, he defeated Democrat Mark R. Herring, who later became Virginia's Attorney General. Potts eventually chaired the Senate Education and Health Committee. Decades earlier, Harry Byrd, Sr. represented the same Senate district, but Potts actually succeeded fellow Methodist and Republican state senator William A. Truban (1971–1991). He was succeeded by Jill Holtzman Vogel, who also defeated Mark D. Tate (in the 2007 Republican primary).

=== Views ===
Potts frequently referred to himself as a "moderate Republican," and criticized the Republican Party for being too far right politically to be in touch with the people it represents. Potts' moderate views on abortion and taxes led some Republicans to label him a Republican In Name Only.

=== Republican opposition to 2005 gubernatorial run ===
Potts ran as an independent in the 2005 Virginia gubernatorial election. Virginia pundits disagreed on how he would affect the November gubernatorial election, and the Winchester City Republican Committee disowned him in early March 2005. Both the Kilgore and Kaine campaigns announced his candidacy to be in their favor — the former because of Potts' relatively liberal views, and the latter for his appeal to moderate Republicans. Potts was considered an underdog to both of these candidates, trailing behind them in popular and financial support. Lloyd Ross, founder of the Tuesday Morning retail chain and frequent contributor to Republican campaigns, donated $300,000 to the Potts campaign.

In April 2005, Lieutenant Governor and Democratic gubernatorial candidate Tim Kaine, in his role as president of the Senate, refused to entertain a motion to strip Potts of his committee assignments. His ruling was upheld on a 27–9 vote.

Kilgore refused to debate Russ Potts, a decision which columnist Barnie Day said could strengthen Potts' underdog appeal and was a poor decision by Kilgore. It is unclear whether this had any effect on the election's outcome. Russ Potts polled 9% in a Mason-Dixon poll, but then dropped to 6% in a September poll. He needed to poll 15% in two separate polls to qualify for participation in the October Kaine-Kilgore debate. This poll was taken before Potts' TV ads ran. Although Potts was excluded from the final debate, he agreed to be sequestered in an office at Richmond's WTVR-TV during Sunday evening's debate and was not allowed to hear any of the questions nor any of the answers offered by his opponents. Minutes after the debate ended, Potts was taken into WTVR-TV studios where the station played back the debate in real time and recorded Potts' answers to each of the debate questions.

In the last week of the campaign, Jerry Kilgore's campaign sent out a direct mail piece contrasting Potts with Tim Kaine and encouraging "progressive" voters to support Potts. The piece was billed as a "2005 Official Democrat and Progressive Voter Guide," but a notice in small print, turned 90 degrees to the rest of the piece and placed next to a picture so as to resemble a photo credit, noted that it was paid for by "Virginians for Jerry Kilgore". The State Board of Elections imposed a $100 fine for the violation.

== Personal life and death ==
Potts married Emily Strite in 1965, and they had three daughters.

After a series of falls, Potts died from viral pneumonia in Winchester on December 19, 2021, aged 82.

== Sources ==
- Russ Potts Vision for Virginia
- Day, Barnie: Politics 101 – People don't pull for the overdog: Potts as Pac Man, June 23, 2005.
- Edds, Margaret: Russ Potts: A Republican voice from outside the tent, The Virginian-Pilot, April 10, 2005.
- Graham, Chris: Potts, Kilgore tear into Kaine roads plan, Augusta Free Press, June 29, 2005.
- Helderman, Rosalind S.: Potts Faces Wrath of Va. GOP: Leaders Move to Oust Senator Over Independent Bid, The Washington Post, March 9, 2005.
- Kilgore, Kaine Still About Even In Va. Poll, September 19, 2005.
- Shapiro, Jeff E.: Donor puts $300,000 into Potts Campaign, Richmond Times-Dispatch, April 14, 2005.
