= Judith Jagdmann =

American politician

Member of the Virginia State Corporation Commission
- In office February 1, 2006 – December 31, 2022
- Preceded by: Clinton Miller
- Succeeded by: Kelsey Bagot

43rd Attorney General of Virginia
- In office February 1, 2005 – January 14, 2006
- Governor: Mark Warner
- Preceded by: Jerry Kilgore
- Succeeded by: Bob McDonnell

Personal details
- Born: Judith Ann Williams; November 3, 1958 (age 67) Norton, Virginia, U.S.
- Party: Republican
- Spouse: Joseph Victor Jagdmann
- Parent: Glen M. Williams (father)
- Education: University of Virginia (BA); University of Richmond (JD)
- Occupation: Lawyer; politician

Judith Williams Jagdmann (born November 3, 1958) is an American attorney who served as the 43rd Attorney General of Virginia. She was elected by the Virginia General Assembly to fill the vacancy created when Jerry Kilgore resigned to run for governor, and remained in office until the election of Bob McDonnell. She served on the Virginia State Corporation Commission from 2006 to 2022.

Jagdmann is the daughter of the late Glen Morgan Williams, a longtime judge of the United States District Court for the Western District of Virginia.

Legal offices
Preceded by Jerry Kilgore	Attorney General of Virginia; February 1, 2005 – January 14, 2006	Succeeded by Bob McDonnell
