= George B. Fitch =

Chinese-born American politician

- Born: February 7, 1948; Canton, China
- Died: December 30, 2014 (aged 66); Falls Church, Virginia, US
- Occupations: Businessman, politician
- Political party: Republican

George Bradley Fitch (February 7, 1948 – December 30, 2014) was a Chinese-born American business consultant and Republican politician. He served four consecutive terms as the mayor of Warrenton, Virginia, for a total of 16 years, before retiring in June 2014. He ran in the 2005 Republican primary for the governorship of Virginia, a race which he lost to Jerry Kilgore. Having long had ties to Jamaica, Fitch was one of the co-founders of the Jamaican Bobsled Team for the 1988 Winter Olympics in Calgary. Determined to achieve what most dismissed as impossible, Fitch's success inspired the Disney film Cool Runnings. In 2007 he proposed that his town generate all of its energy from methane released from a nearby landfill. In 2010 he authored the book A Pathway To Local Energy Independence.

Fitch was born of a missionary family in Canton, China, during the Chinese Communist Revolution. His father had served with the OSS behind the lines during the Japanese invasion and with Chenault's Flying Tigers. His grandfather George Ashmore Fitch, who came to China in 1906 to follow his father as a missionary, was serving as the head of Nanjing YMCA when the Japanese invaded. He joined the Nanking Safety Zone Committee and acted as its administrative director during the Rape of Nanking, documenting atrocities and appealing to the Japanese embassy to restore order. He later wrote a book entitled My Eighty Years in China.

After leaving China, Fitch was raised in India and Singapore, where he graduated from the Singapore American School. He attended the University of Singapore (now the National University of Singapore) for two years, and then returned to the U.S. He graduated with a B.A. in economics from the College of Wooster, Ohio and earned an MBA in International Business from George Washington University. Fitch worked for many years as a Foreign and Commercial Service Officer with the U.S. Department of Commerce. During the Reagan Administration, he was The Commerce Department's chief implementation official for The Caribbean Basin Initiative, travelling to almost every Caribbean and Caribbean Rim nation, meeting with Finance and Trade officials, and, occasionally, heads of State. He spoke several languages.

Fitch died of cancer on December 30, 2014, at Inova Fairfax Hospital in Falls Church, Virginia. He was 66.

== See also ==
- Biogas
