= Jerry Kilgore (politician) =

American lawyer

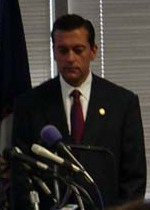

42nd Attorney General of Virginia
- In office January 12, 2002 – February 1, 2005
- Governor: Mark Warner
- Preceded by: Randolph Beales
- Succeeded by: Judith Jagdmann

9th Virginia Secretary of Public Safety
- In office January 15, 1994 – January 17, 1998
- Governor: George Allen
- Preceded by: Randy Rollins
- Succeeded by: Gary K. Aronhalt

Personal details
- Born: Jerry Walter Kilgore; August 23, 1961 (age 64) Kingsport, Tennessee, U.S.
- Party: Republican
- Spouse: Marty
- Relations: Terry Kilgore (brother)
- Education: Clinch Valley College (BA); College of William and Mary (JD)

Jerry Walter Kilgore (born August 23, 1961) is an American attorney and politician. A Republican, he served as Attorney General of Virginia from 2002 to 2005 and was the Republican nominee for Governor of Virginia in 2005, losing to Democratic nominee Tim Kaine. He is a partner with the law firm Cozen O'Connor and is a member of the firm's leading State Attorneys General practice in Washington, D.C. He also serves as finance chair of the Republican Party of Virginia.

He was previously a partner at McGuireWoods and a senior advisor with McGuireWoods Consulting in Richmond, Virginia.

== Background ==
Born in Kingsport, Tennessee on August 23, 1961, Kilgore earned a B.A. degree summa cum laude from Clinch Valley College (now the University of Virginia's College at Wise) in 1983 and a J.D. from the William & Mary School of Law in 1986. His twin brother, Terry Kilgore, has served in the Virginia House of Delegates since 1994.

== Early career ==
During 1987 and 1992, Kilgore served as an Assistant United States Attorney for the Western District of Virginia. He was Secretary of Public Safety under Governor George Allen from 1994 to 1998 and was elected Attorney General of Virginia in the 2001 Virginia Attorney General election by a wide margin.

Kilgore is known for his conservative views on social issues, especially with respect to gun control, religion and abortion. He was critical of Democratic Governor Mark Warner's fiscal policy, particularly the 2004 budget that included substantial tax increases. Kilgore garnered national attention for his opposition to the Herndon day-laborer center and he has traditionally held the view that laws regarding illegal immigration should be enforced stringently.

== 2005 gubernatorial campaign ==
Kilgore resigned as attorney general in February 2005 to run for Governor (as is the convention in Virginia) and easily won the primary election against Warrenton Mayor George B. Fitch to become the Republican nominee. In the general election, he ran against Democratic nominee Tim Kaine, the Lieutenant Governor of Virginia, and State Senator Russ Potts, a pro-choice Republican who ran as an independent candidate. Early in the race, Kilgore showed solid leads of ten points or more in the polls, but Kaine steadily closed the gap and ultimately defeated Kilgore by a margin of 52% to 46%.

Kilgore's campaign was at times criticized for taking steps to avoid debates; Kilgore refused to debate Potts for the majority of the campaign, at times leaving Kaine and Potts to debate each other in his absence. He agreed to debate only with Kaine, and only if the footage could not be aired in campaign commercials. During this debate, he refused to answer whether or not he would make abortion a crime. This apparent public moderation of his previously open and hard-line stance on abortion troubled some of his conservative supporters.

He was further criticized for failing to limit his negative advertisements to 50% of his campaign's total publicity as Kaine proposed. One such advertisement featured a father whose son had been murdered by a man who was on Virginia's death row; the father expressed doubt that the sentence would be carried out if Kaine were elected and alleged that Kaine would not even have authorized the execution of Adolf Hitler, based on an interview with the Richmond Times-Dispatch. The negative reaction to the mention of Hitler combined with Kaine's pledge to carry out the death penalty and explanation of his personal opposition as arising from his Catholic faith helped to neutralize what many observers thought would've been a potent issue for Kilgore.

In trying to explain how a solid Republican could lose a traditionally Republican state by such a large margin, political commentators cited numerous key factors. Kaine's campaign had many political advantages, including his association with the state's popular Democratic Governor Mark Warner and defense of Warner's 2004 budget priorities, his "response ads" to Kilgore's death penalty advertisements, which featured him speaking to voters about his religious convictions, his relentless in-person campaigning across the state, and his opposition to tax increases. In contrast, Kilgore's campaign had many political disadvantages, including a backlash over the death penalty ads that Kilgore's campaign ran in the fall, the relatively low poll numbers of then-President George W. Bush at the time the election, and a bitter division between the moderate and conservative wings of the Republican party over tax and spending priorities.

== Electoral history ==
Date	Election	Candidate	Party	Votes	%
Attorney General of Virginia
Nov 6, 2001	General	J W Kilgore	Republican	1,107,068	60.01
Nov 6, 2001	General	A D McEachin	Democratic	736,431	39.92
Nov 6, 2001	General	Write Ins		1,282	0.07
Nov 6, 2001	General	Mark Earley resigned for election-year replacement Randolph A. Beales; seat remained Republican			
Governor of Virginia
Jun 14, 2005	Republican primary	J W Kilgore		145,002	82.78
Jun 14, 2005	Republican primary	G B Fitch		30,168	17.22
Nov 8, 2005	General	T M Kaine	Democratic	1,025,942	51.72
Nov 8, 2005	General	J W Kilgore	Republican	912,327	45.99
Nov 8, 2005	General	H R Potts Jr		43,953	2.22
Nov 8, 2005	General	Write Ins		1,556	0.08
Nov 8, 2005	General	Mark Warner could not run for consecutive terms; seat remained Democratic			

Legal offices
Preceded by Randolph A. Beales	Attorney General of Virginia; 2002–2005	Succeeded by Judith Jagdmann
Party political offices
Preceded by Mark Earley	Republican nominee for Governor of Virginia; 2005	Succeeded by Bob McDonnell
