= Virginia's 27th Senate district =

American legislative district

Virginia's 27th State Senate district
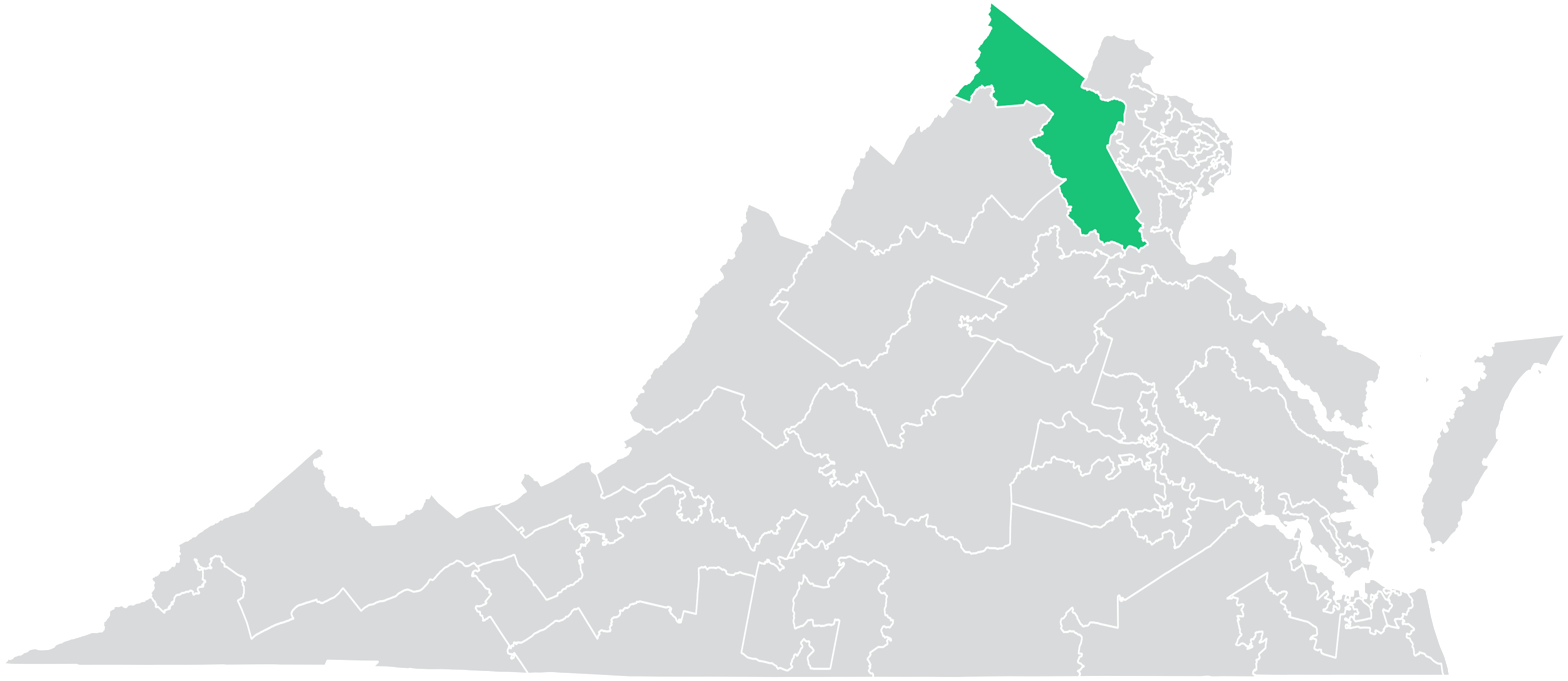
Senator
Tara Durant; R–Fredericksburg
- Demographics: 80% White; 6% Black; 9% Hispanic; 2% Asian; 3% Other
- Population (2019): 219,263
- Registered voters: 160,822

Virginia's 27th Senate district is one of 40 districts in the Senate of Virginia. It has been represented by Republican Tara Durant since 2024.

== Geography ==
District 27 is located in northwestern Virginia. The district is in the Tidewater and Piedmont regions, and includes portions of the counties of Spotsylvania and Stafford.The independent city that is part of district 27 is Fredericksburg.

The district is located entirely within Virginia's 7th congressional district, and overlaps with the 23rd, 63rd, 64th, and 65th districts of the Virginia House of Delegates.

== Recent election results ==
=== 2019 ===
2019 Virginia Senate election, District 27
Party	Candidate	Votes	%
Republican	Jill Vogel (incumbent)	43,353	64.2
Democratic	Ronnie Ross	24,114	35.7
Total votes		67,532	100
Republican hold			

=== 2015 ===
2015 Virginia Senate election, District 27
Party	Candidate	Votes	%
Republican	Jill Vogel (incumbent)	34,203	97.3
Total votes		35,167	100
Republican hold			

=== 2011 ===
2011 Virginia Senate election, District 27
Party	Candidate	Votes	%
Republican	Jill Vogel (incumbent)	24,555	74.6
Democratic	Shaun Broy	7,636	23.2
Independent	Donald Marro	681	2.1
Total votes		32,917	100
Republican hold			

=== Federal and statewide results ===
Year	Office	Results
2020	President	Trump 59.1–39.1%
2017	Governor	Gillespie 59.7–39.1%
2016	President	Trump 60.0–34.6%
2014	Senate	Gillespie 63.3–34.3%
2013	Governor	Cuccinelli 59.6–35.2%
2012	President	Romney 59.3–38.9%
2012	Senate	Allen 59.0–41.0%

== Historical results ==
All election results below took place prior to 2011 redistricting, and thus were under different district lines.

Prior to 2011 redistricting, the district had consisted of Clark County, Fauquier County, Frederick County, Loudoun County, and Winchester.

=== 2007 ===
2007 Virginia Senate election, District 27
Primary election
Party	Candidate	Votes	%
Republican	Jill Vogel	3,778	54.0
Republican	Mark Tate	2,022	28.9
Republican	Terrence Nyhous	654	9.3
Republican	Richard Robinson	548	7.8
Total votes		7,002	100
General election
Republican	Jill Vogel	24,960	48.4
Democratic	Karen Schultz	24,301	47.2
Independent	Donald Marro	2,170	4.2
Total votes		51,521	100
Republican hold			

=== 2003 ===
2003 Virginia Senate election, District 27
Primary election
Party	Candidate	Votes	%
Republican	Russ Potts (incumbent)	7,495	50.4
Republican	Mark Tate	7,389	49.6
Total votes		14,884	100
General election
Republican	Russ Potts (incumbent)	26,152	58.2
Democratic	Mark Herring	18,460	41.1
Total votes		44,947	100
Republican hold			

=== 1999 ===
1999 Virginia Senate election, District 27
Primary election
Party	Candidate	Votes	%
Republican	Russ Potts (incumbent)	7,942	62.1
Republican	Mike McHugh	4,856	37.9
Total votes		12,798	100
General election
Republican	Russ Potts (incumbent)	26,276	99.2
Total votes		26,479	100
Republican hold			

=== 1995 ===
1995 Virginia Senate election, District 27
Party	Candidate	Votes	%
Republican	Russ Potts (incumbent)	27,424	65.2
Democratic	Thomas Lewis	14,622	34.8
Total votes		42,052	100
Republican hold			
