= President's House (College of William & Mary) =

Historic house in Virginia, US

- President's House, 2021
- Interactive map of the President's House area

General information
- Location: Williamsburg, Virginia, United States
- Coordinates: 37°16′16.4″N 76°42′30″W
- Construction started: 1732
- Owner: College of William and Mary in Virginia

Technical details
- Floor count: 2 (original); 3 (renovation of attic)
- Floor area: 5,763 feet
- Wren Building (Old College Yard, College of William and Mary)
- U.S. National Register of Historic Places
- U.S. National Historic Landmark
- Virginia Landmarks Register
- Location within Virginia
- Coordinates: 37°16′16.4″N 76°42′30″W
- NRHP reference No.: 66000929
- VLR No.: 137-0013

Significant dates
- Added to NRHP: October 15, 1966
- Designated VLR: September 9, 1969

The President's House is the residence of the President of the College of William & Mary in Williamsburg, Virginia. Constructed in 1732, the building still serves its original purpose and is among the oldest buildings in Virginia. Since its construction only one of the college's presidents, Robert Saunders Jr., has not moved into the building, which is let for free to the president. The President's House is William & Mary's third-oldest building and the oldest official college presidential residence in the United States.

== Location ==
The President's House is located on the College's Ancient Campus (also known as "Historic Campus"). Situated northeast of the Wren Building and facing the Brafferton to the building's south, the President's House is considered to be a component of the Wren Building's forecourt. Together, these seventeenth-century structures form the centerpiece of the Virginia Landmarks Register's Williamsburg Historic District.

The three buildings occupy the wedge formed by the confluence of Richmond Road and Jamestown Road. These two roads originate at Richmond (the current capital of Virginia) and Jamestown (the first capital of the Colony of Virginia), intersecting at the western terminus of Duke of Gloucester Street and forming an intersection referred to by locals as "Confusion Corner" or "College Corner". President's House is visible looking west from Duke of Gloucester Street in present-day Merchant's Square of Colonial Williamsburg.

== Design ==
Copying much of the Brafferton design, Henry Cary Jr. built the President's House to sit directly across from the Brafferton on the campus. Each dimension of the President's House is four feet (1.2 m) larger than the Brafferton. A central passage on the ground floor was built with two rooms on each side with a dining room and parlor in the front, austerely mirroring contemporaneous Georgian gentry residences in the Tidewater region. The exterior features a hip roof, five-bay design on Flemish bond brickwork with glazed headers.

During its 1928–1931 renovations as part of John D. Rockefeller Jr.'s efforts to restore Williamsburg to its colonial appearance, several of the outbuildings were rebuilt or altered. Among them was a garage built during Benjamin Ewell's 1854–1888 presidency, which was converted into a firehouse. The grounds of the President's House also include a flower garden and an unpaved driveway.

== History ==
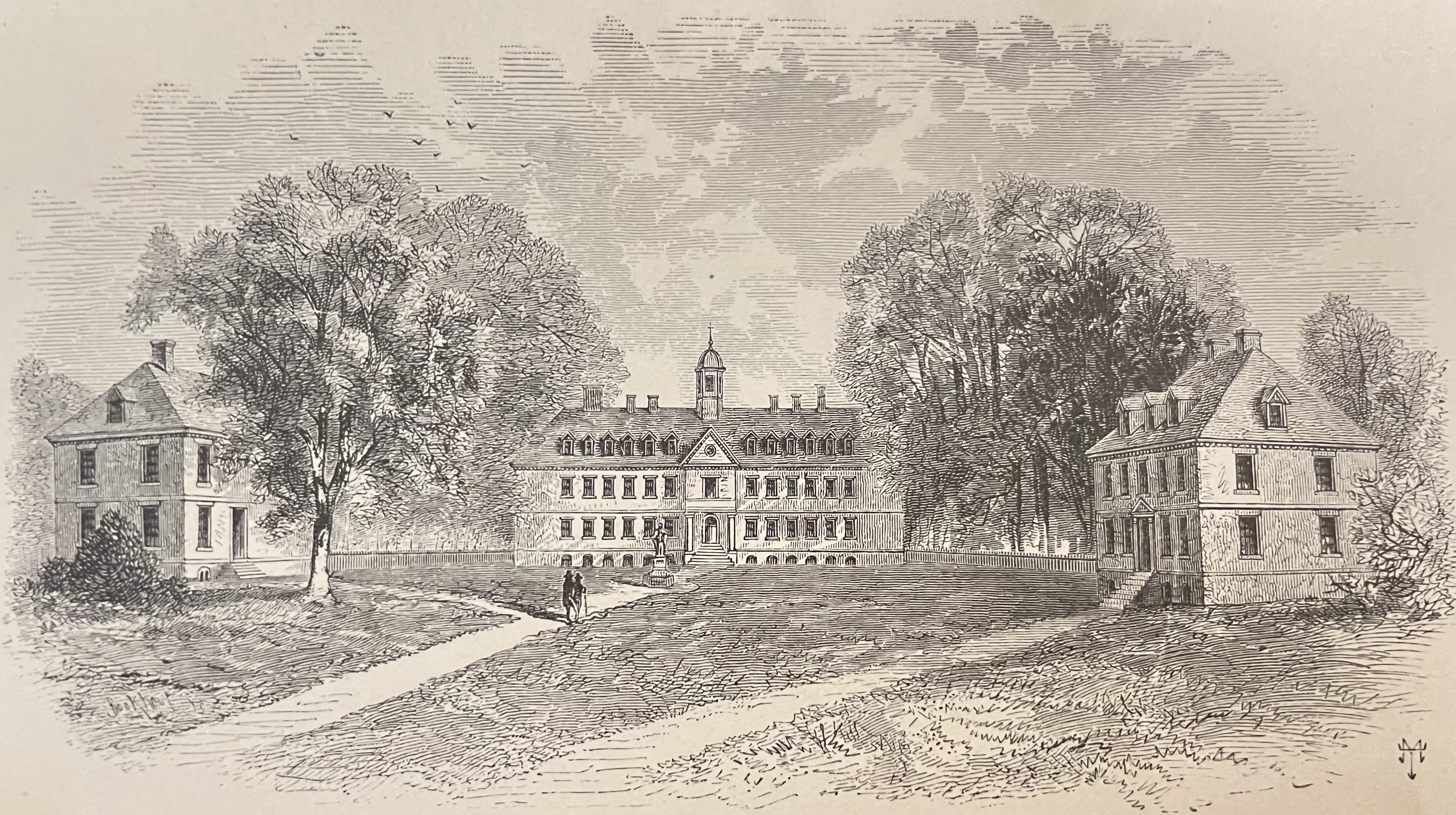
Print depicting Ancient Campus as it would have appeared before an 1859 gutted the Wren Building; the President's House is located to the right

The College of William and Mary in Virginia was chartered on 8 February 1693 by King William III and Queen Mary II, the King and Queen of England, as a seminary for the Church of England in Virginia. Middle Plantation, a halfway point between Jamestown along the James River and the small settlement of Chiskiack along the York River, was selected as the site of this new school. On the site of what is now the President's House ran a wooden palisade built in 1633 that cut through Middle Plantation to prevent Powhatan incursions in the aftermath of the massacre of English settlers in 1622 and the ensuing Second Anglo-Powhatan War. The palisade survived less than a decade but figured largely in the societal memory of the first students at the College over 60 years later.

Construction began on the Sir Christopher Wren Building—named for its potential architect, Christopher Wren—on 8 August 1695 as the College's first building. The construction on the Wren Building was completed in 1699, the year the City of Williamsburg was both established and became the second capital of Virginia, but rebuilding was required following a fire in 1705. In 1717, Governor Alexander Spotswood established a school for Indians. In 1723, the Brafferton was constructed to house this school.

Williamsburg resident Henry Cary Jr. is thought to have been contracted to construct the Brafferton and did extensive work on the Governor's Palace and Capitol. On 31 July 1732, several weeks after completing the Wren Building's chapel wing in 1732, Cary is recorded as having laid the foundation for the President's House. Construction was completed the next year, with the College's first president and founder James Blair moving in. Both the Brafferton and the President's House were built by enslaved laborers hired out to the College.

Among the earliest depictions of the President's House can be found in the Bodleian Plate, a copperplate dating to circa 1735–1740 of indeterminate origin—though perhaps meant to illustrate a book by William Byrd II—and rediscovered in the Bodleian Library archives in 1929 by historian Mary F. Goodwin. The Frenchman's Map, thought to be the product of a French Army officer's survey of Williamsburg near the end of the Revolutionary War, notes the location of the President's House. This map was used extensively by Episcopalian minister W. A. R. Goodwin—the longtime rector of Bruton Parish—and later the Rockefeller-funded restoration effort to chart the site of Williamsburg buildings circa 1782.

In 1781, during the American Revolutionary War, General Charles Cornwallis of the British Army established his headquarters in the President's House. The British troops were evicted shortly thereafter, with French and Continental Army wounded receiving treatment both in the House and the Governor's Palace. Lafayette would eventually take the President's House as his temporary housing and headquarters. Both the President's House and Governor's Palace would burn during the Franco-Continental occupation, with the President's House burning before the Battle of Yorktown and Governor's Palace burning on 22 December. The Kingdom of France donated the necessary funds to restore the President's House in 1786, though the Governor's Palace was not rebuilt until 1934. Minor fires would again damage the building in 1879 (destroying much of the second and third floors), 1916, and 1922 (destroying the roof). The first fire is cited as the basis of most ghost stories relating to the President's House, despite no records of any fatalities associated with the inferno.

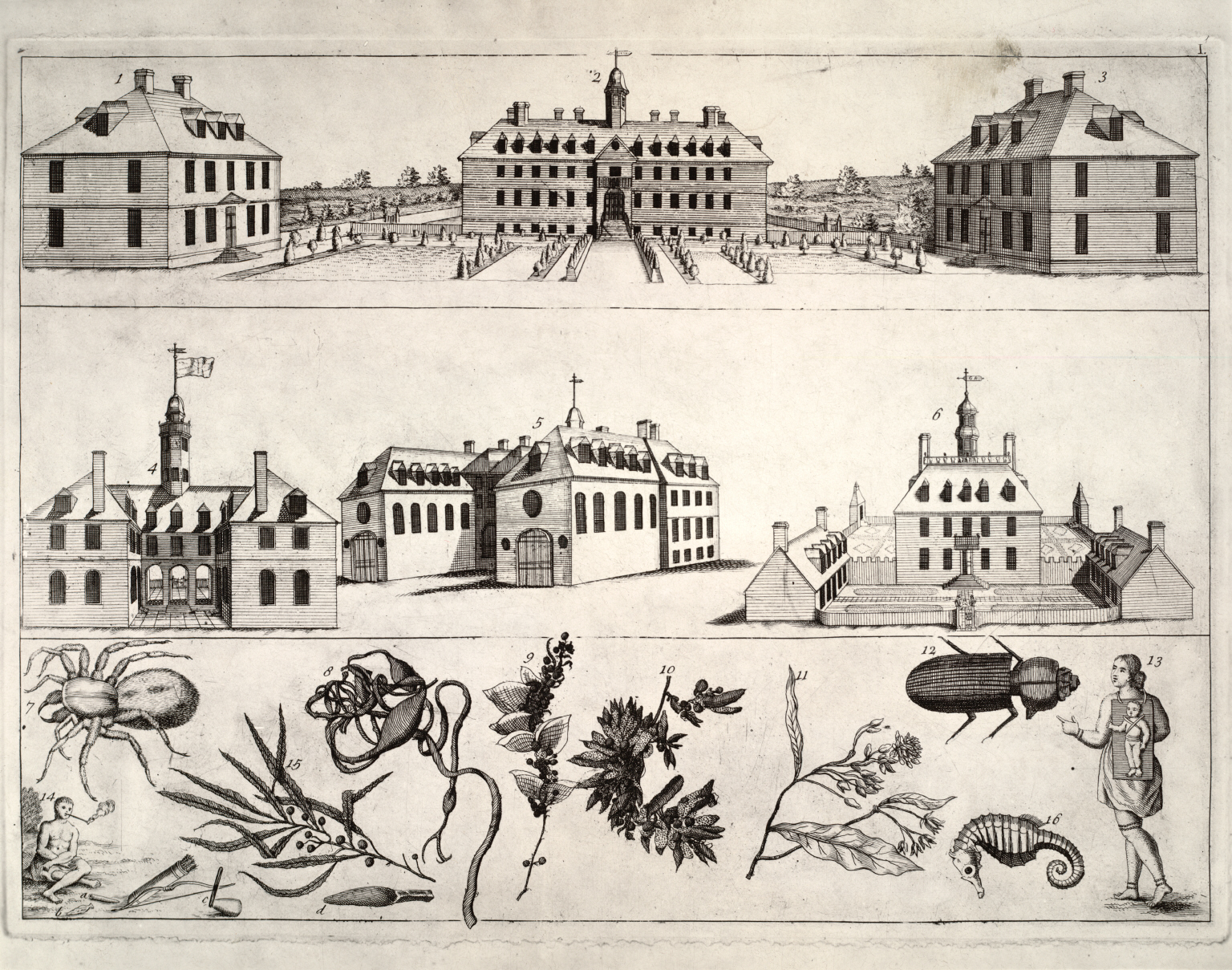
Print of the Bodleian Plate, with President's House in the upper right

Union Army troops used the House as a headquarters during the 5 May 1862 Battle of Williamsburg in the Peninsular Campaign of the American Civil War. The President's House went unscathed despite a fire reportedly set by the 5th Pennsylvania Cavalry Regiment burning the Wren Building. Much of the college's library collection had been move to the President's House in 1861, thus sparing them the flames. Through until the end of the war and for a period after, the President's House was used as a fortified Union regimental headquarters.

John D. Rockefeller, Jr. publicly announced his intentions to include the Ancient Campus of the College in his restoration of Williamsburg to its colonial appearance in January 1928. On 15 January 1931, the College handed over the President's House to Rockefeller's Williamsburg Holding Corporation for restoration, with work completed by the end of the summer.

Every President of the United States from Woodrow Wilson to Dwight D. Eisenhower visited the President's House, as did Winston Churchill. Queen Elizabeth II was a guest at the President's House twice: in 1957 and May 2007, as part of celebrations for the 350th and 400th anniversaries respectively of the establishment of the Jamestown Colony.

== See also ==
- Bacon's Castle
- Muscarelle Museum of Art
- Peyton Randolph House
- Wythe House
