= Hearth: Memorial to the Enslaved =

Memorial in Virginia, US

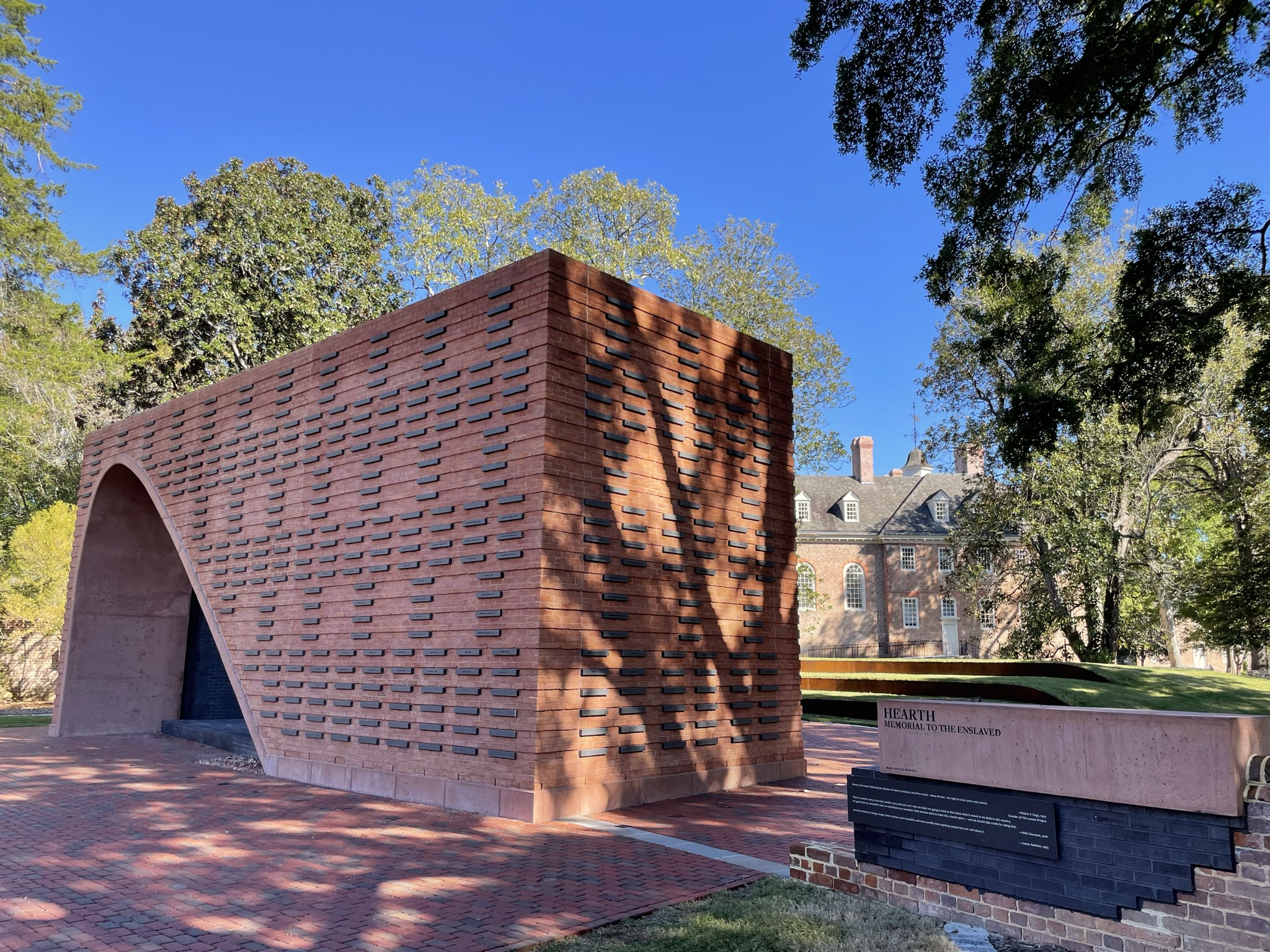
- Hearth: Memorial to the Enslaved viewed facing the Wren Building, 2022
- Location: College of William and Mary, Williamsburg, Virginia, United States
- Designer: William Sendor
- Material: Brick, granite
- Width: 16 ft (4.9 m)
- Height: 20 ft (6.1 m)
- Beginning date: May 2021
- Dedicated date: May 7, 2022
- Dedicated to: 100+ enslaved individuals at William & Mary from 1693-1863
- Website: https://www.wm.edu/sites/enslavedmemorial/

Hearth: Memorial to the Enslaved is a memorial on the campus of the College of William & Mary in Williamsburg, Virginia. It was dedicated in 2022 to those enslaved by the university over a period of 172 years.

== Background ==
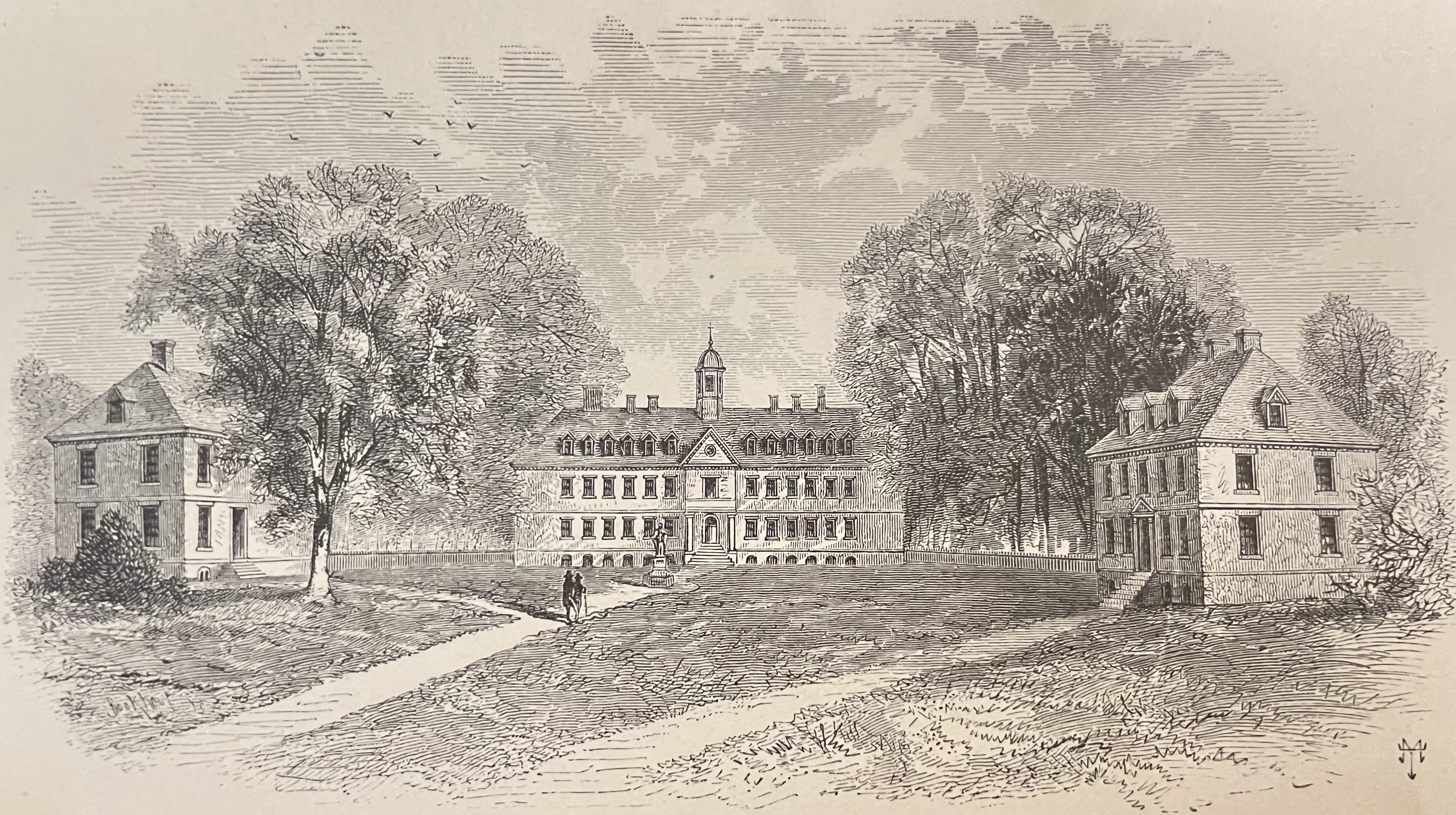
(Left to right) The Brafferton, the Wren Building, President's House, depicted as they would have appeared before 1859

The College of William and Mary was founded in 1693, and benefited from slave labor in various capacities. Historians discovered the names of over 100 people owned by college employees, students, and the college itself; the actual number of slaves was likely much higher.

The three primary buildings on the college's Ancient Campus (also called "Historic Campus")—the Brafferton, Wren Building, and President's House—were constructed and maintained in part using enslaved labor. Slaves both made the bricks used in construction of the Wren Building and erected the building itself.

== Planning ==
In 2009, the college began the Lemon Project, an effort to research how enslaved people lived and worked at the college throughout its history. In 2014, the Lemon Project's director, Jody Allen, along with instructor Ed Pease, asked students to submit proposals for a possible memorial to the enslaved.

On August 28, 2018, the college launched an international competition to solicit ideas for the memorial. Over 80 entries were received.

On April 26, 2019, Katherine Rowe, the president of William & Mary, announced the winning design for the memorial. Titled "Hearth" and designed by William Sendor, a William & Mary alumnus who graduated in 2011, the memorial would be made of brick and serve as a gathering spot. Some bricks would be inscribed with names of enslaved people.

== Construction and dedication ==
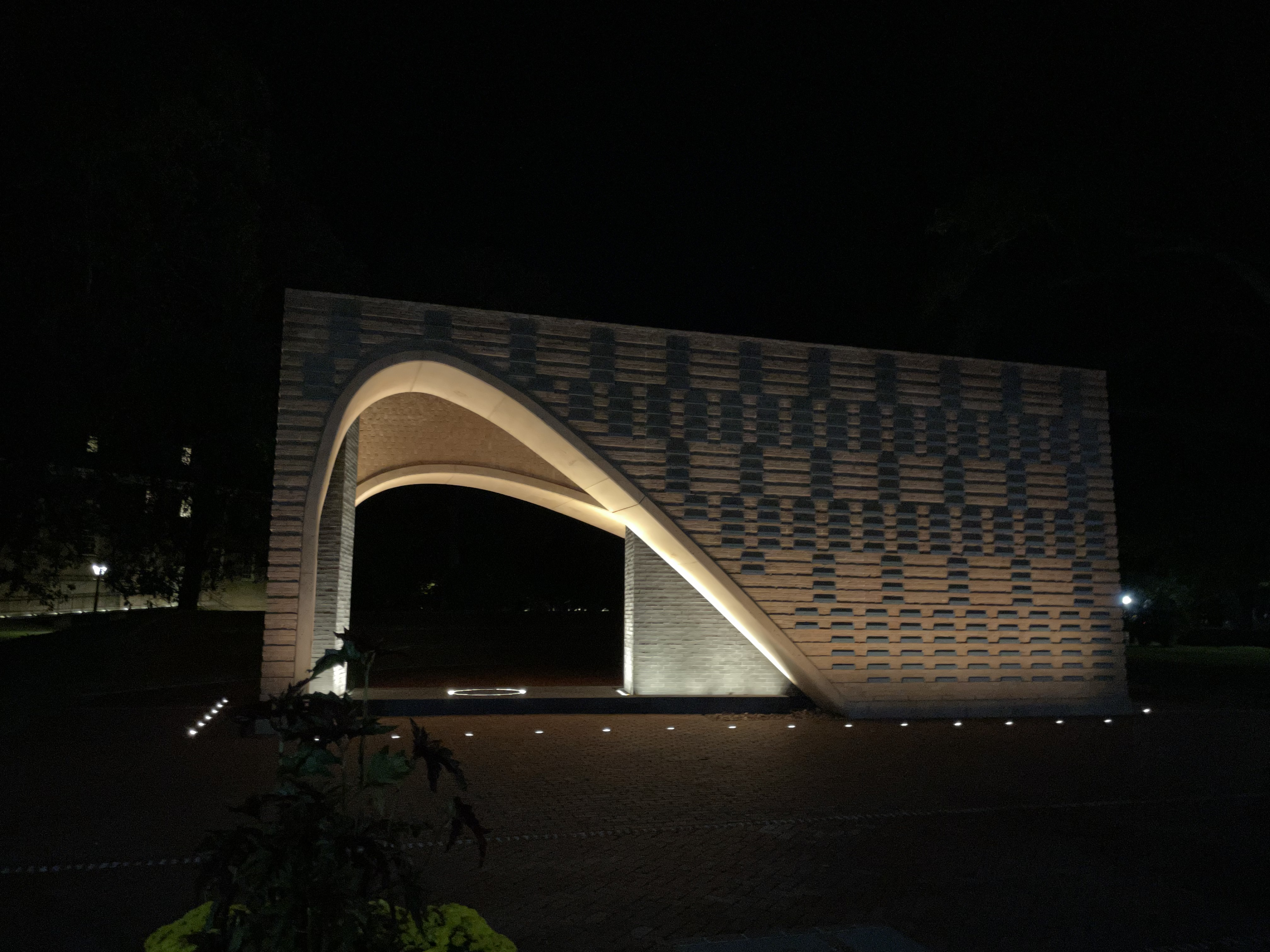
Hearth: Memorial to the Enslaved at night, 2022

To build the concept into a physical memorial, the college tapped Richmond-based architects Baskervill and construction firm Kjellstrom & Lee. Groundbreaking took place in May 2021. In 2019, a drainage system – dating from reconstruction work following the 1705 fire at the Wren Building and incorporating vaulted brick – was accidentally reopened during work constructing the memorial. Some of the bricks from the drain, likely made by enslaved persons, were incorporated into the memorial.

The memorial stands at a height of 20 feet (6.1 meters) and a width of 16 feet (4.9 meters). Its construction cost $2.9 million, which was funded through private donations and contributions from the university’s board of visitors.

The dedication ceremony took place on May 7, 2022, and was attended by over 800 people.

On March 18, 2023, a handcrafted vessel holding fire was installed. It was formally dedicated on May 4, 2023. The vessel will be illuminated during community events on ceremonial occasions throughout the year.
