= Bodleian Plate =

18th-century copperplate of Virginia

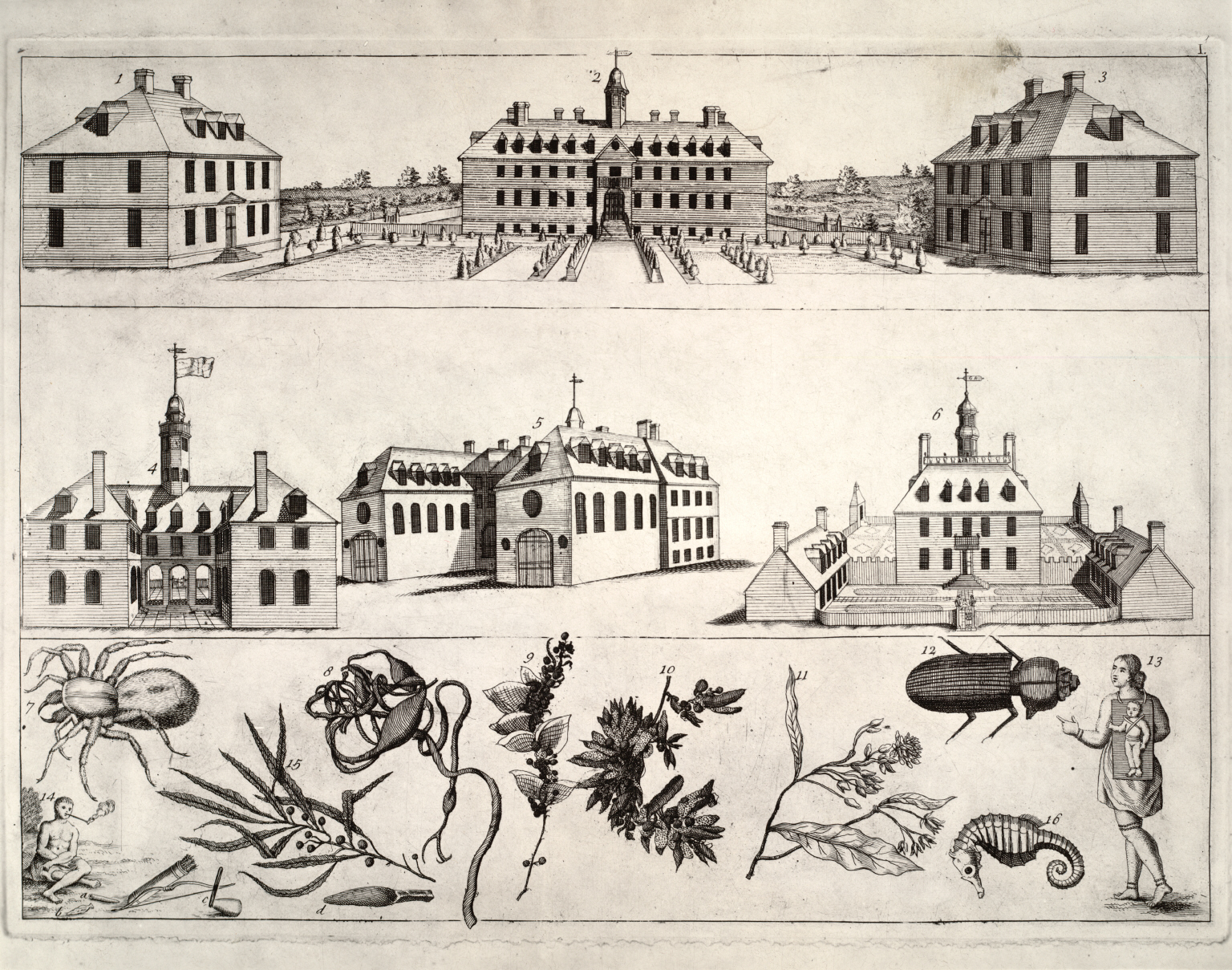
Print made with Bodleian Plate

The Bodleian Plate is a copperplate depicting several colonial buildings of 18th-century Williamsburg, Virginia, as well as several types of native flora, fauna, and American Indians. Following its 1929 rediscovery in the archives of the Bodleian Library, it was used extensively in John D. Rockefeller Jr.'s reconstruction of Colonial Williamsburg. The plate has been tied to the Williamsburg resident William Byrd II and may have been produced by the English illustrator Eleazar Albin and the engraver John Carwitham. It is dated to the 1730s.

== Imagery ==
The top third of the image depicts the campus of the College of William and Mary in Virginia looking west. Labeled "1" and to the left (to the right on the plate itself) is the Brafferton, a school for American Indians. Visible in the center–labeled "2"–is the eastern side of the Wren Building, then often known simply as "the College". The building labeled "3" on the right is the President's House. Topiary surrounding the buildings is also visible in the top panel.

The center third of the plate again depicts the Wren Building in the middle, this time from a perspective to the southwest with the chapel wing in the foreground. To the left of the print is an eastern-facing perspective of the Capitol as it appeared before a 1747 fire. The right-center image depicts the Governor's Palace and associated structures in a north-facing perspective from above the Palace Green.

The bottom third is ten separate images. Among them are plants and animals from Virginia and nearby. Labeled "16", a lined seahorse–a native species of the Chesapeake Bay–is depicted. Additionally, two images of local Indians flank both sides of the bottom portion.

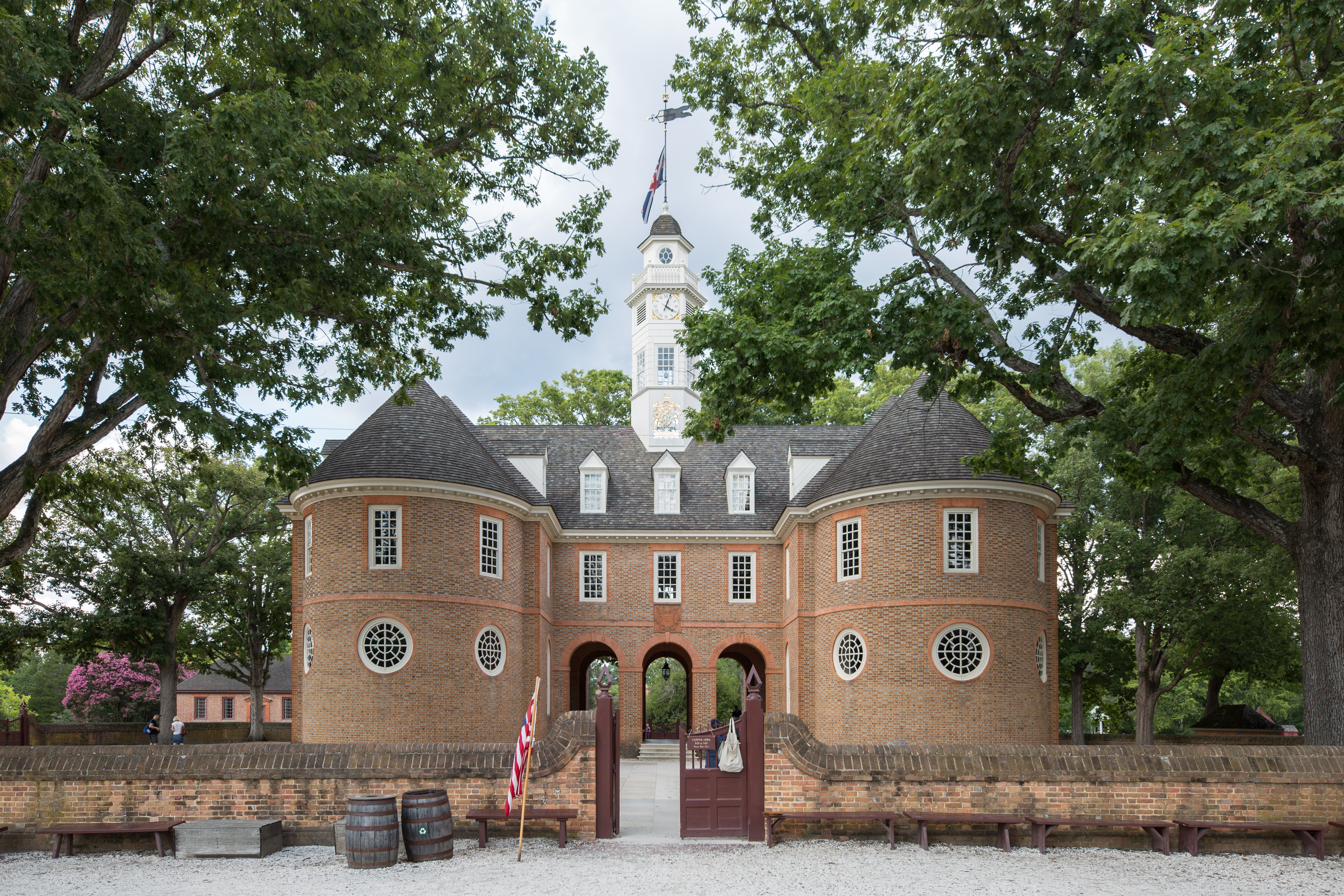
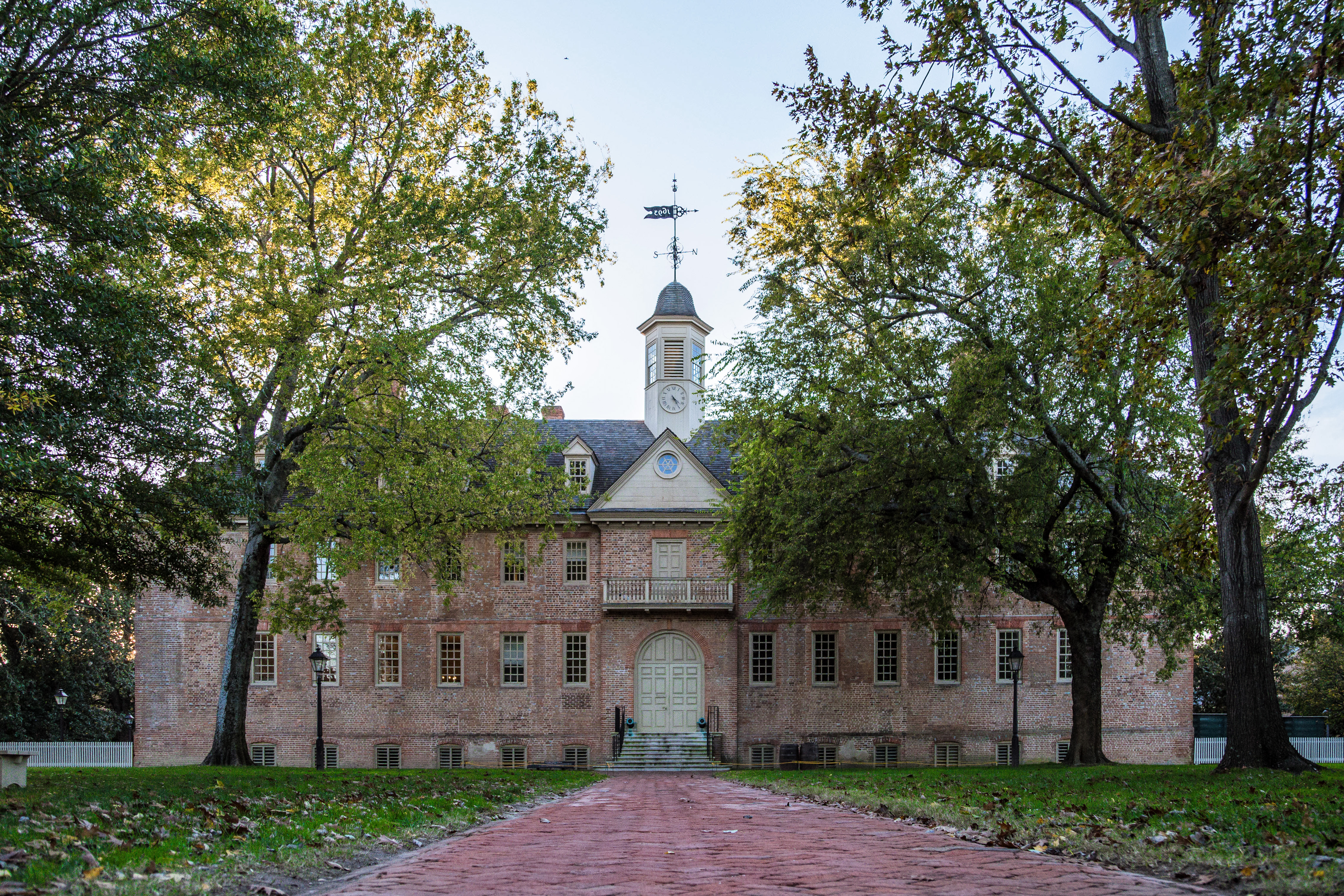
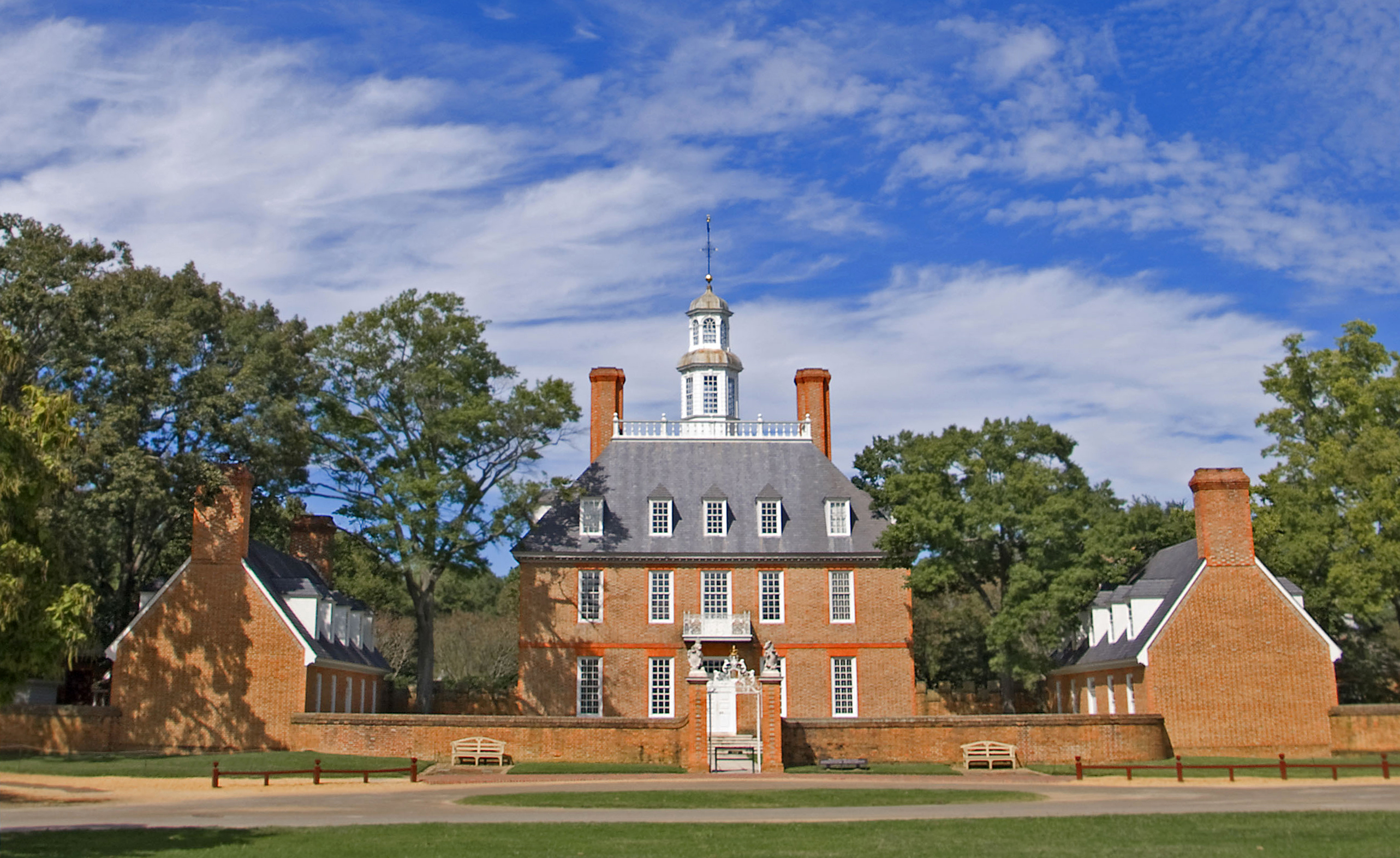
Buildings from the middle panel of the plate. Left to right: Capitol, Wren Building, Governor's Palace.

== History ==
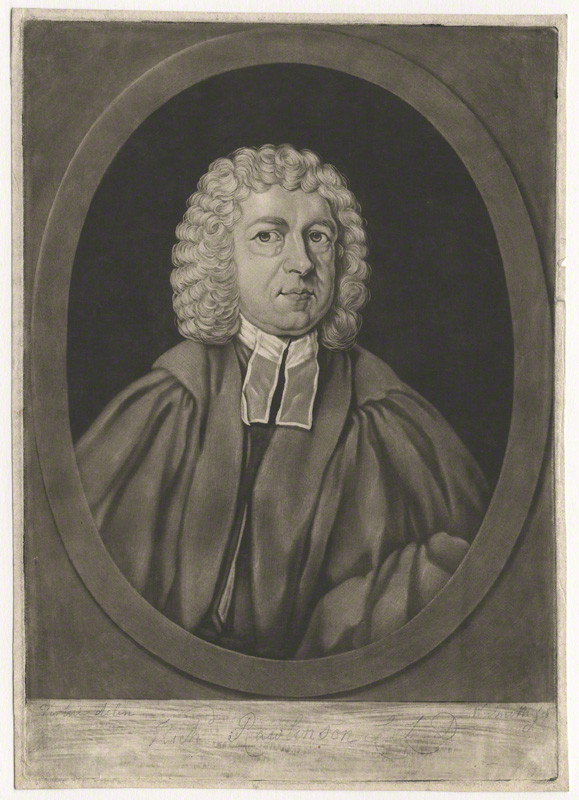
Richard Rawlinson

The Bodleian Plate is so-named for its discovery in the archives of the Bodleian Library at the University of Oxford in England. The copperplate was bequeathed to the library as part of the collection of Richard Rawlinson, a nonjuring Church of England clergyman and antiquarian who died in April 1755. His donation to the library totaled over one million books, manuscripts, and engravings–all of which had been originally willed to the Society of Antiquaries before a falling-out.

Efforts to rebuild the Wren Building to its colonial appearance began in 1928 as part of John D. Rockefeller Jr.'s broader efforts to restore Williamsburg. The project had been in part the brainchild of W.A.R. Goodwin, the Episcopal rector of Bruton Parish. In December 1929, the researcher Mary F. Goodwin located and recognized the Bodleian Plate as depicting colonial-era Williamsburg, Virginia.

The discovery proved instrumental in the reconstruction of the Wren Building–for which no other complete colonial depiction of the western side existed. Prior to the discovery of the plate, much of what renovation was planned came from descriptions written by Thomas Jefferson, an alumnus of the college. It also helped in the reconstruction of all four other structures depicted, particularly the Governor's Palace and its outbuildings.
