= Capitol (Williamsburg, Virginia) =

Reconstructed historic building in Virginia, US

Coordinates: 37.271258°N 76.69329°W

- U.S. National Historic Landmark District – Contributing property
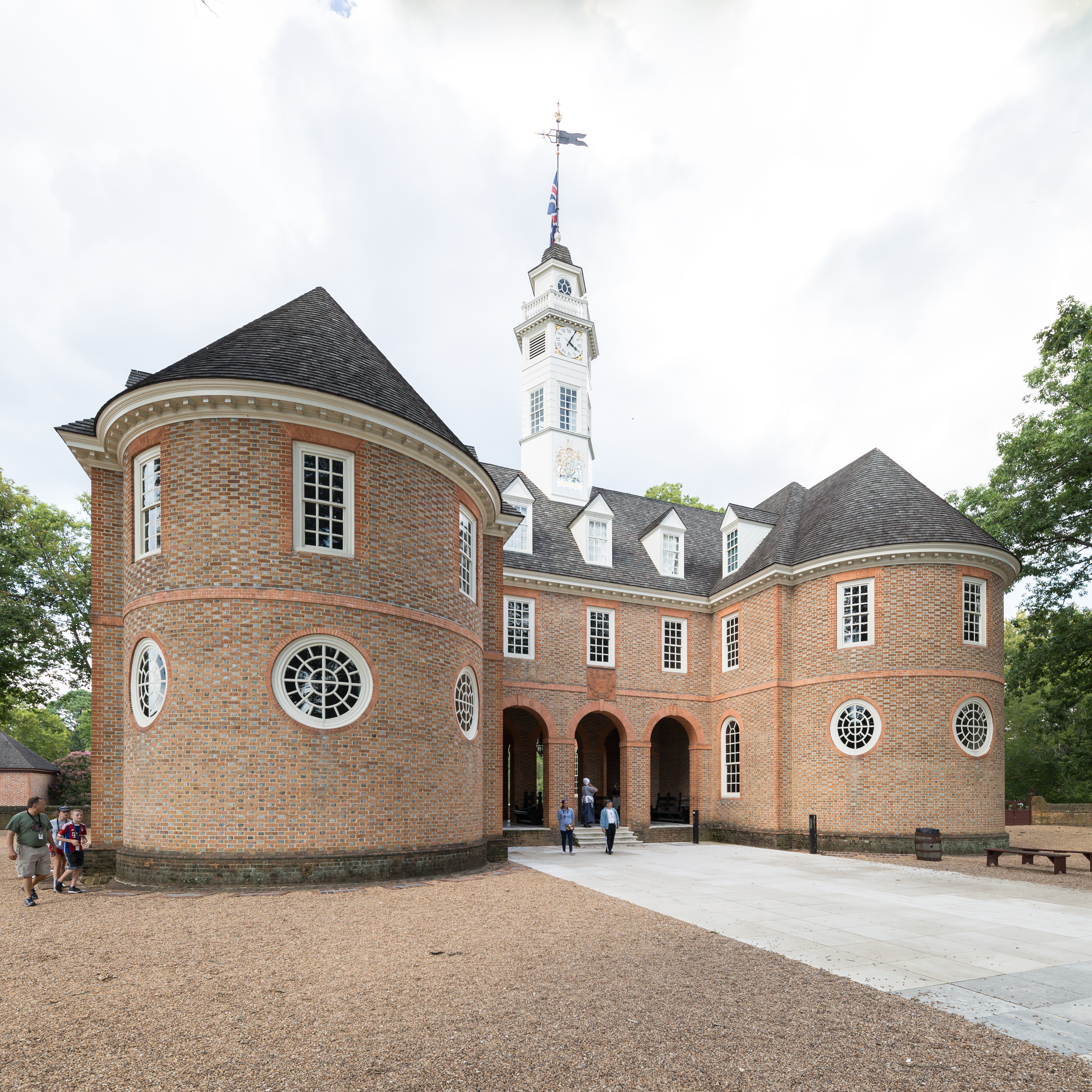
- Reconstruction of the first Capitol at Williamsburg

- Location within Virginia Location within the United States
- Location: Williamsburg, Virginia
- Built: 1934, based on 1705 original
- Architectural style: Colonial Revival
- Part of: Williamsburg Historic District (ID66000925)
- Added to NRHP: October 15, 1966

The Capitol at Williamsburg, Virginia, housed both houses of the Virginia General Assembly, the Governor's Council and the House of Burgesses of the colony of Virginia from 1705, six years after the colonial capital was relocated there from nearby Jamestown, until 1780, when the capital was relocated to Richmond. Two capitol buildings served the colony on the same site: the first from 1705 until its destruction by fire in 1747; the second from 1753 to 1780.

The earlier capitol was reconstructed in the early 1930s as part of the restoration of Colonial Williamsburg. The reconstruction has thus lasted longer than the combined total of both original capitol buildings.

== History of Williamsburg ==
=== First Williamsburg Capitol (1705–1747) ===
In 1698, the Capitol building in Jamestown, Virginia, burned. Following the fire, the government of Virginia decided to relocate inland, away from the swamps at the Jamestown site.

A better Capitol building was constructed by Henry Cary, a contractor finishing work on the College of William and Mary Wren Building (the legislature's temporary home). Begun in 1701, the Capitol was completed in 1705, although the legislature moved in during 1704. In 1714, the Governor's Palace was constructed between the College and the Capitol.

The Colonial Capitol was a two-story H-shaped structure, functionally two buildings connected by an arcade. Each wing served one of the two houses of the Virginia legislature, the Council and the House of Burgesses. The first floor of the west building was for the General Court and the colony's secretary, the first floor of the east for the House of Burgesses and its clerk. As a result of the fires that had destroyed several prior Virginia capitals, Cary built the first Capitol without fireplaces. In 1723, chimneys were added for fireplaces to help keep the Capitol dry. On January 30, 1747, the building burned and only some walls and the foundation remained.

=== Second Williamsburg Capitol (1753–1779) ===
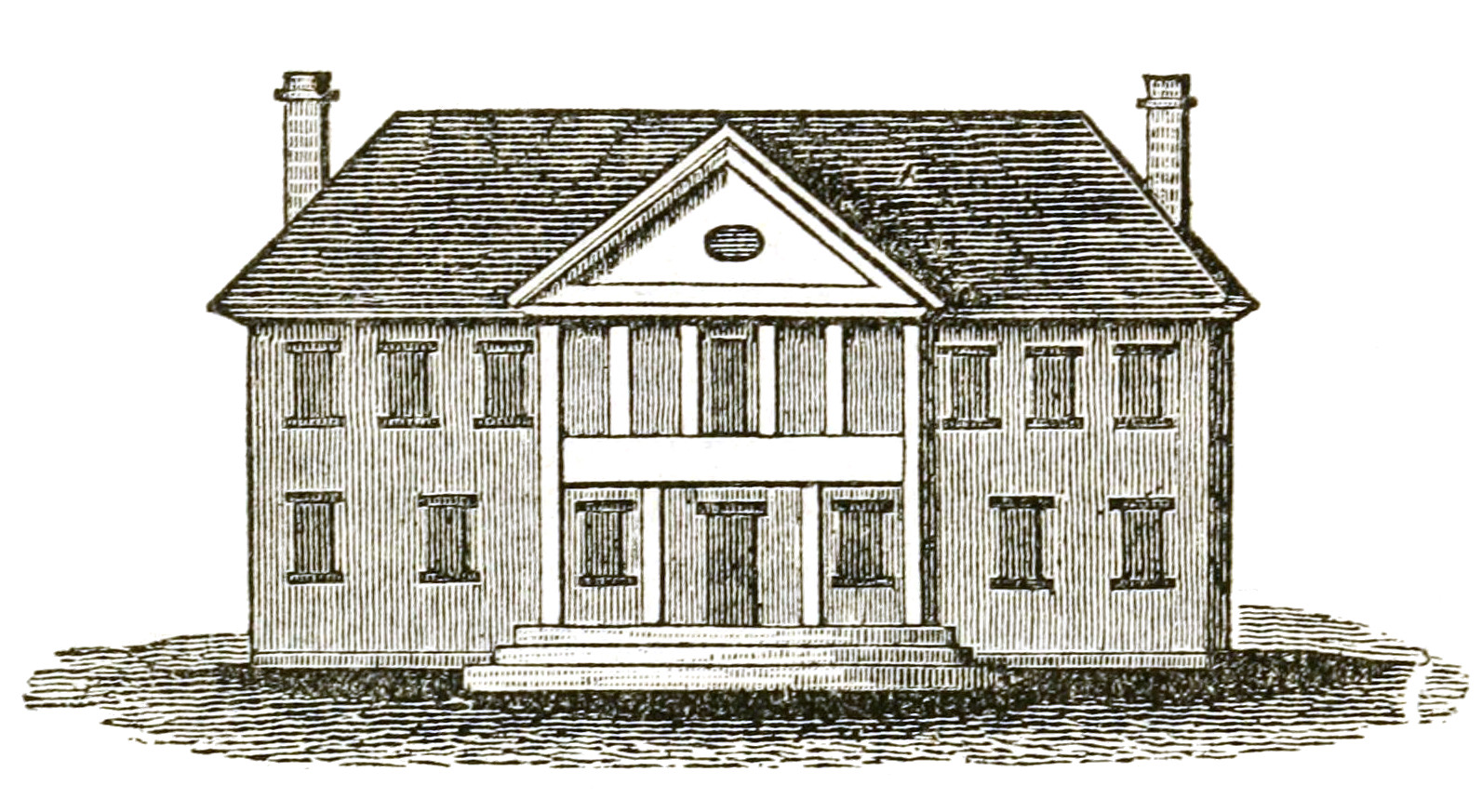
1845 engraving based on then-surviving drawings of the second capitol at Williamsburg (viewed from Duke of Gloucester Street)

Governor William Gooch urged that the Capitol be rebuilt, but many legislators preferred relocating the government to a city more accessible to trade and navigation. In the meantime, the burgesses met again at the nearby Wren Building. Finally, in November 1748, reconstruction of the Capitol was approved (by only two votes: 40 to 38). The burgesses met inside for the first time on November 1, 1753. James Skelton, owner of Elk Island, was contracted to build the Capitol.

In this building, Patrick Henry delivered his Caesar-Brutus speech against the Stamp Act on May 29, 1765. Henry, George Washington, George Mason, George Wythe, Richard Henry Lee, Thomas Jefferson, and others played parts in the legislative maneuvering that ended in revolution. As fighting began in the North, the building featured discussion concerning Mason's Virginia Declaration of Rights, his Virginia constitution, and Jefferson's first attempt at a bill for religious freedom.

On June 29, 1776, Virginians declared their independence from Great Britain and wrote the state's first constitution, thereby creating an independent government four days before Congress voted for the Declaration of Independence in Philadelphia on July 4.

The Capitol at Williamsburg served until the American Revolutionary War began, when Governor Thomas Jefferson urged it that the capital be relocated to Richmond. The building was last used as a capitol on December 24, 1779, when the Virginia General Assembly adjourned to reconvene in 1780 at the new capital, Richmond.

After the capital of Virginia was moved to Richmond in 1779, the old Capitol was used for a wide range of purposes, from a court to a school. The east wing was removed around 1800 because of its dangerous condition, leaving only the west wing standing for the next 30 years, until it was destroyed by fire in 1832, leaving no trace of the original structure, except for the outline of its foundations.

== Reconstruction ==
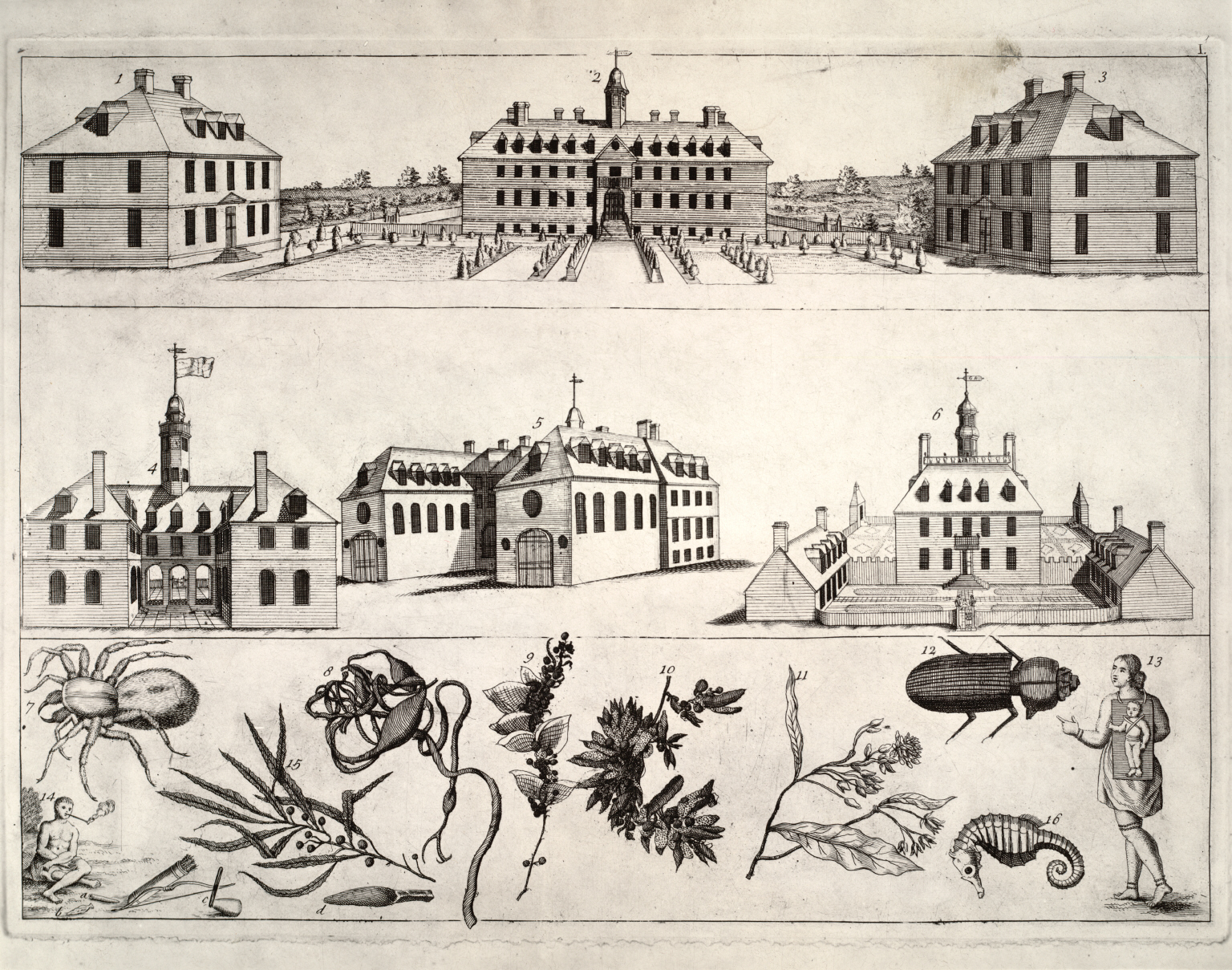
Print made with the Bodleian Plate. First Capitol depicted in center row on the left.

The building that stands now in Colonial Williamsburg is the third Capitol on that site. Early in the 20th century, the Reverend Dr. W. A. R. Goodwin undertook restoration of historic Bruton Parish Church (c. 1711) where he was rector. His dreams of restoring other buildings of the old colonial capital city led to his affiliation with Standard Oil heir and philanthropist John D. Rockefeller Jr. and the creation of Colonial Williamsburg. The reconstructed Capitol and Governor's Palace join the Wren Building of the College of William & Mary as the three main structures of the restoration.

The architects charged with restoration of Williamsburg chose to reconstruct the first capitol based on superior documentation of its design, including in the 1929-discovered Bodleian Plate, and its unique architecture compared to the second Capitol. Later architectural historians have since shown that parts of the reconstruction, chiefly its foundations, were embellished or conjectural and were based more on contemporary architectural ideas than actual historic evidence. However, the reconstructed Capitol is now itself valued as a Colonial Revival interpretation and work of architecture.

The reconstruction opened to the public on February 24, 1934.

== Gallery ==
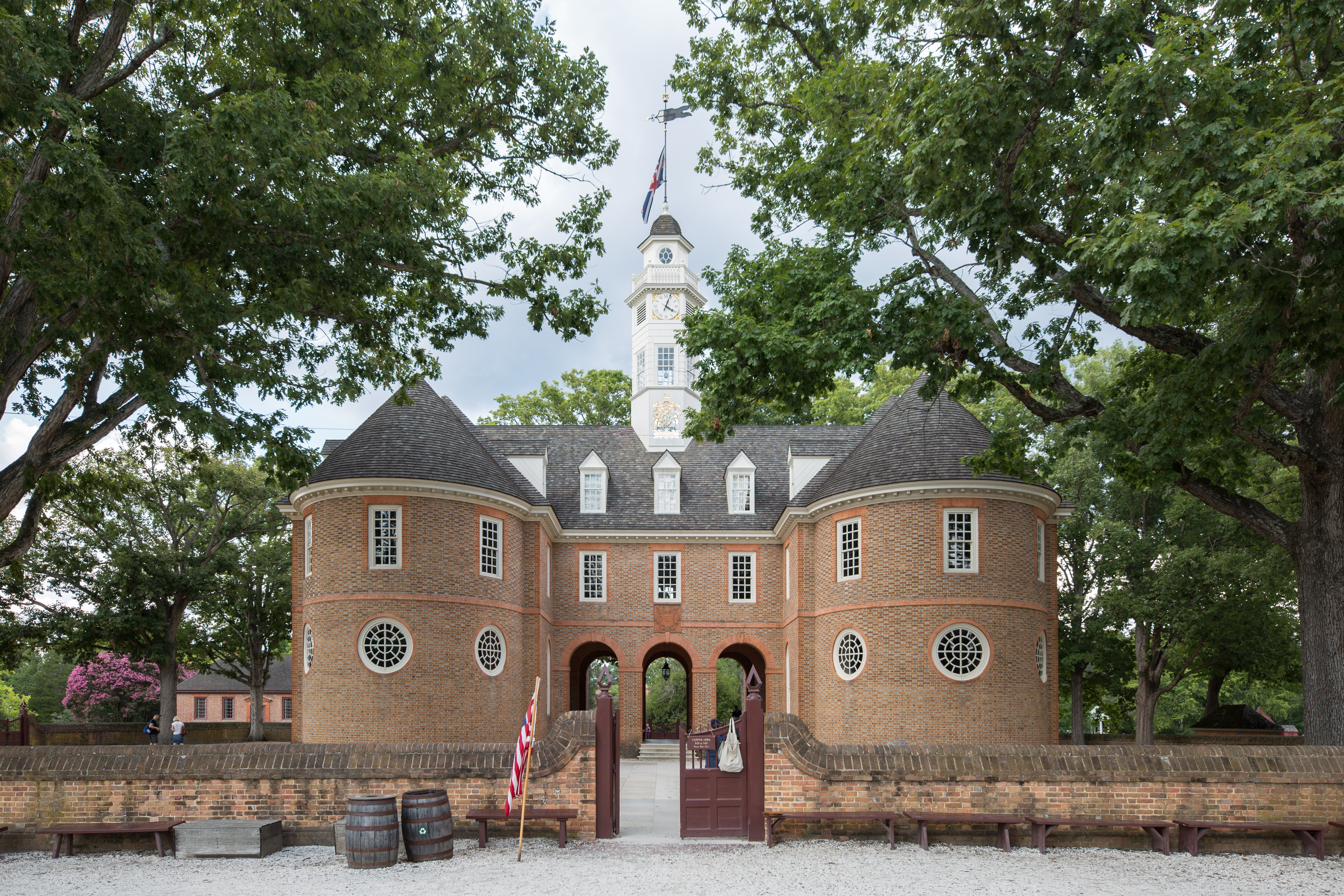
Reconstruction exterior

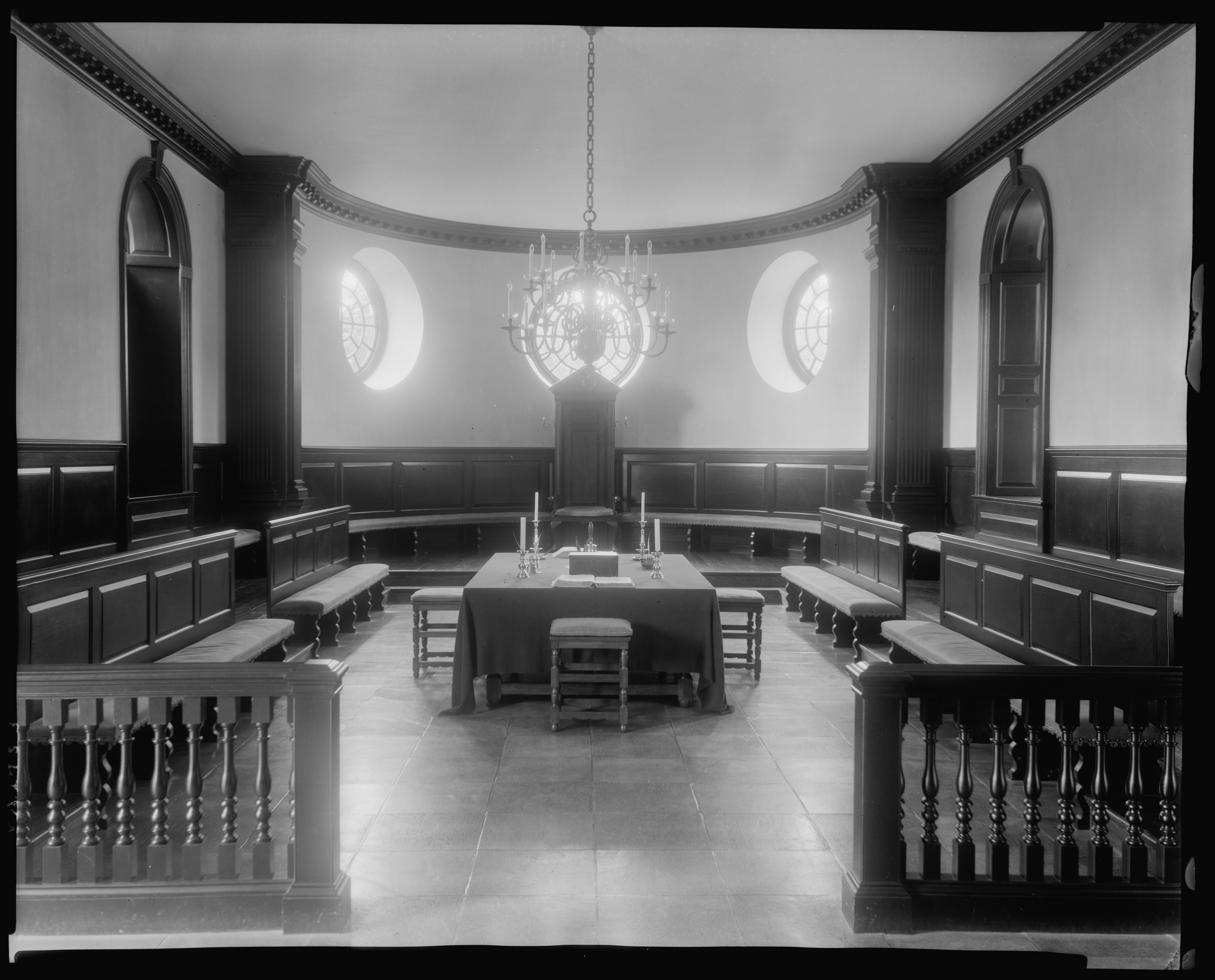
Reconstructed chamber of the House of Burgesses

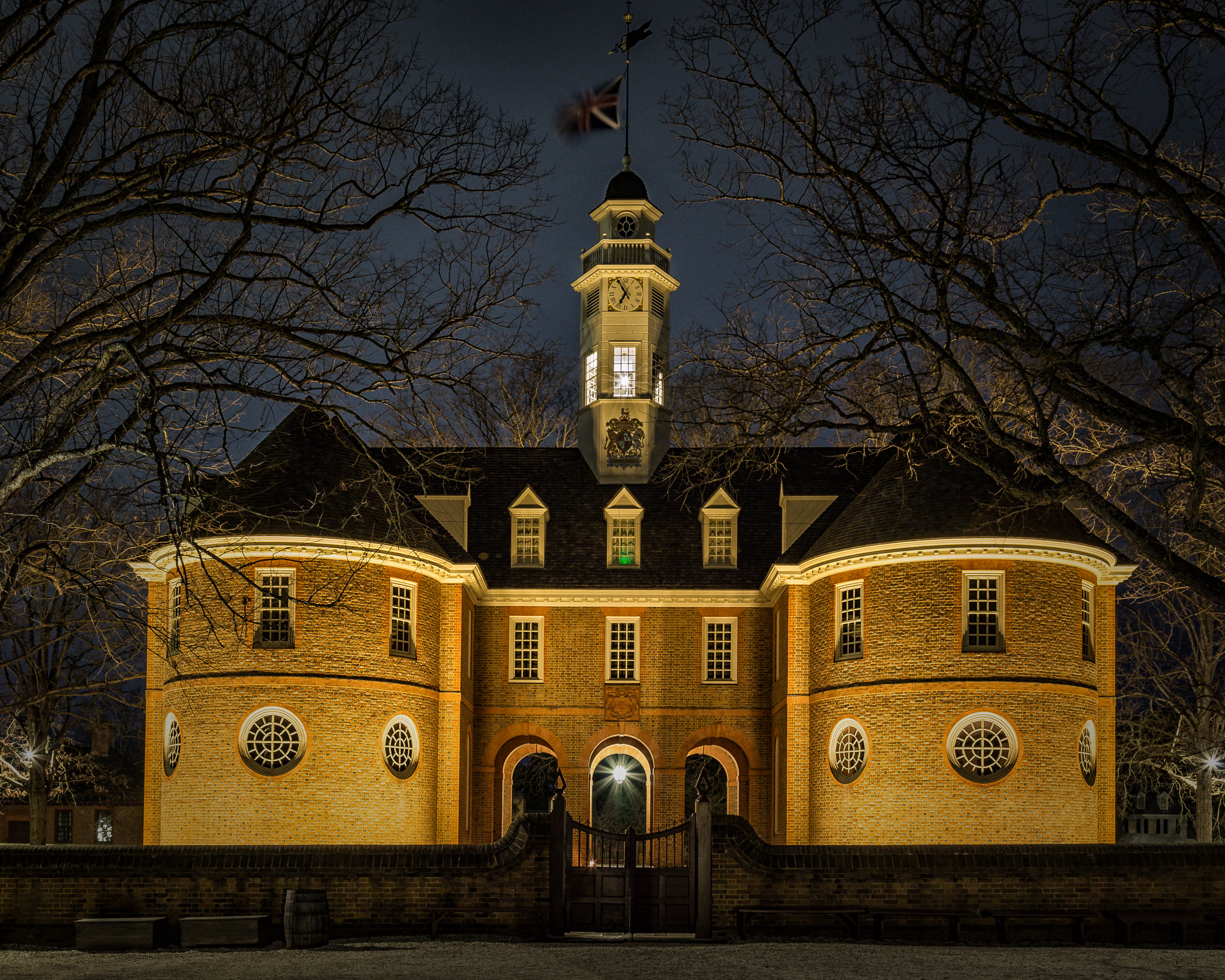
The reconstructed building at night.

== See also ==
- Virginia State Capitol (Richmond)
