= Saint John's Episcopal Church (Petersburg, Virginia) =

Church building in Virginia, United States

Coordinates: 77°13′27.7″N 77°25′2.7″W

Saint John's Episcopal Church was founded in Petersburg, Virginia in 1868. The present brick edifice was begun in 1897, replacing a frame structure. The original plans did not include a steeple but the druggist across the street from the church stepped in and donated funds so that a steeple could be added. The church is of provincial Gothic design: brick and New England quarried brownstone with a distinctive Buckingham Slate roof in alternating fish scale and diamond patterns. The bell in the belfry weighs one ton. Flagstones at the front entrance were salved from the Jarratt Hotel which stood at the corner of Washington and Union streets until 1902, receiving visits from two United States' presidents, Polk and Grant, as well as other prominent figures.

The pulpit, dating to 1828 was a gift from Bruton Parish. The brass eagle lectern is a memorial to Dr. Duncan Brown, first superintendent of schools from the city of Petersburg. The organ façade is from the Hook and Hastings organ which was used until the 1950s.

The Right Reverend Alfred Magill Randolph, first bishop of the Diocese of Southern Virginia, preached the first sermon in the new church building. The Reverend Dr. W.A.R. Goodwin was one of the Church's most notable rectors (from 1893-1903) and he went on to accept a call to Bruton Parish from Saint John's in 1903. He then played an instrumental role in enlisting the Rockefeller aid for the restoration of Williamsburg.

The Reverend Churchill Gibson was called as rector three separate times and a marble tablet dedicated to his service at Saint John's marks the entrance to the Good Shepherd Chapel. A marble tablet on the east wall is a memorial to the young men and women who served in World War II. The baptismal font, a memorial gift by the congregation to a senior warden and lay leader who had devoted thirty faithful years to that service, has been used to baptize hundreds down through the year, including Joseph Cotten.

The Good Shepherd Chapel is a permanent memorial to the Good Shepherd Chapel which stood at the corner of Washington Street and Crater Road until a storm imposed irreparable damage. The Adoring Angels windows were salvaged and installed over the chapel altar at Saint John's. The bishop's chair was also brought to Saint John's. Good Shepherd was originally built as a memorial to David Brydon Tennant, a prominent Petersburg tobacconist, by his wife. The original cornerstone stands in the garden of Saint John's today.
