= Governor's Palace (Williamsburg, Virginia) =

Historic property and museum in Virginia, United States

Governor's Palace, Williamsburg
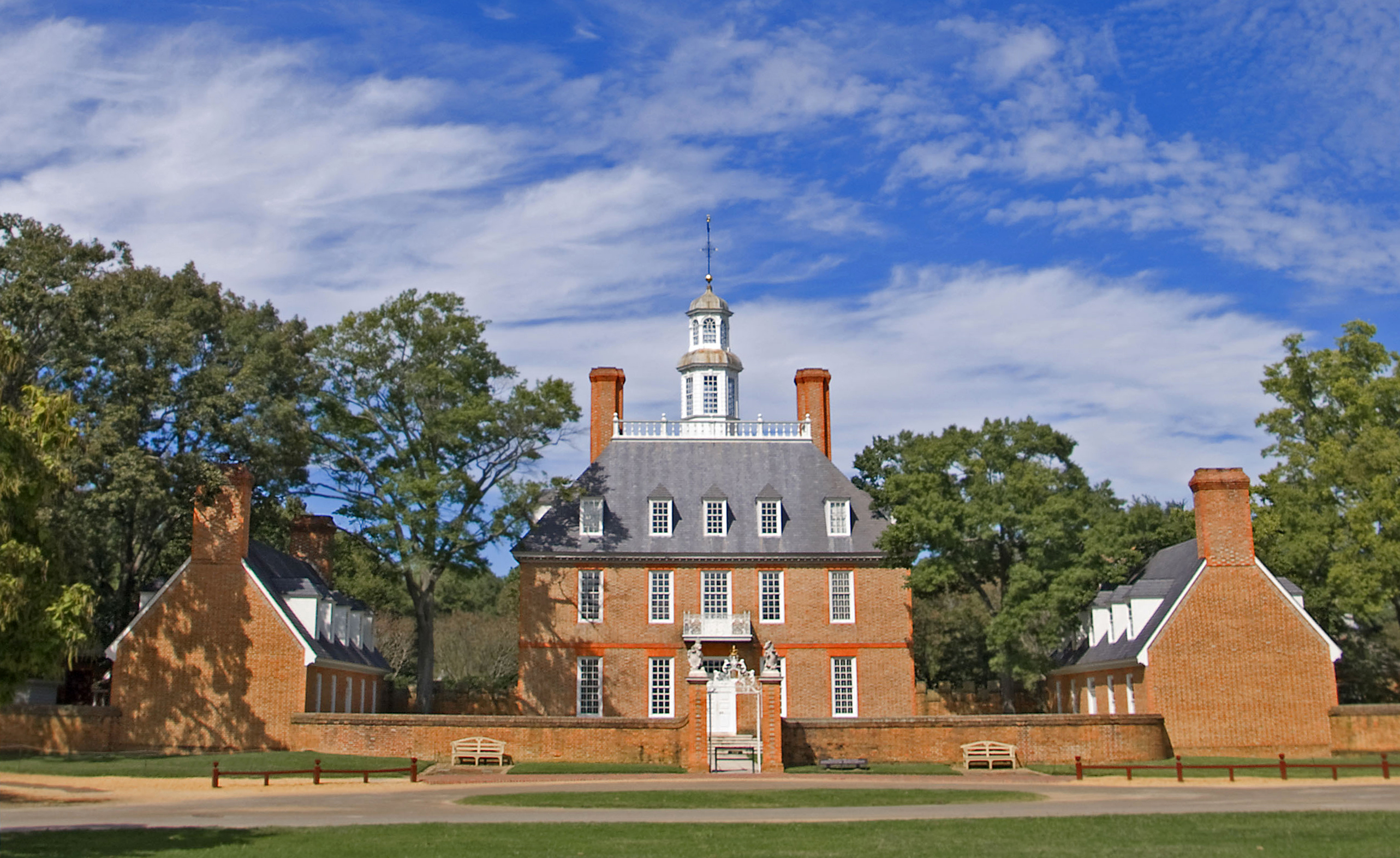
- Main façade of the Governor's Palace

- Location within Virginia
- Alternative names: Spotswood's Folly

General information
- Status: Rebuilt, used as a house museum
- Architectural style: Georgian
- Location: Duke of Gloucester Street, Williamsburg, Virginia, United States
- Coordinates: 37°16′27.3″N 76°42′7.6″W
- Year built: 1931–1934
- Opened: April 23, 1934
- Owner: Colonial Williamsburg
- Governor's Palace
- U.S. National Historic Landmark District – Contributing property
- Part of: Williamsburg Historic District (ID66000925)
- Added to NRHP: October 15, 1966

The Governor's Palace, Williamsburg was the official residence of the British governors of Virginia.

Located in Williamsburg, Virginia, the original building also served as the official residence of two U.S. state governors, Patrick Henry and Thomas Jefferson. In 1780, the capital relocated to Richmond, and with it the governor's residence. The main building burned down in 1781, though the outbuildings survived for some time after. The governor's palace was reconstructed in the 1930s on its original site. It is one of the two largest buildings at Colonial Williamsburg, the other being the colonial capitol.

== History ==
Williamsburg was established as the new capital of the Virginia colony in 1699, and served in that capacity until 1780. During most of that period, the Governor's Palace was the official residence of the royal governor.

=== Construction and design ===
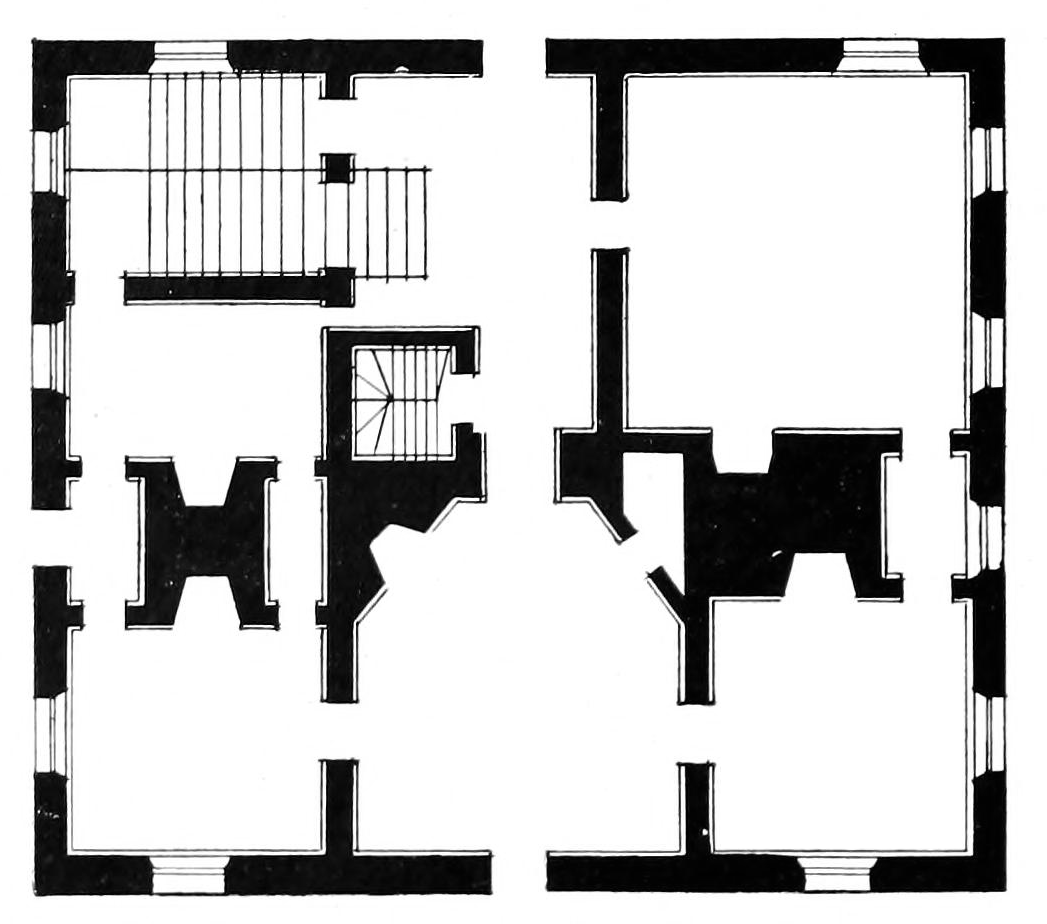
Floor plan of the Governor's Palace.

The palace was funded by the House of Burgesses in 1706 at the behest of Lt. Governor Edward Nott. It was built from 1706 onward. In 1710, its first official resident was Lt. Governor Alexander Spotswood who served as acting governor; the governor proper, George Hamilton, 1st Earl of Orkney, was absentee and is not known to have visited Virginia. Spotswood continued to improve on it until ca. 1720–1722, adding the forecourt, gardens, and various decorations.

Under Lt. Gov. Robert Dinwiddie, from 1751 to 52, it was repaired and renovated, including the addition of a large rear addition featuring a ballroom.

The exterior of the Governor's Palace inspired the design of the Sigma Nu Theta chapter fraternity house at the University of Alabama.

=== Occupants ===
The seven governors who lived in the original palace included:

- Alexander Spotswood
- Francis Fauquier
- Lord Botetourt
- Hugh Drysdale
- William Gooch
- Robert Dinwiddie
- John Murray, 4th Earl of Dunmore

Home to a colonial mayor:

- John Amson, 1750-1751

It was also home to the post-colonial governors:

- Patrick Henry, 1776–1779
- Thomas Jefferson, 1779–1780

=== Destruction ===
Around 1779, Governor Thomas Jefferson proposed the remodeling of the Palace in manner in keeping with his neoclassical ideals. The proposal would have added a temple-like portico to the front and back.

However, in 1780, Jefferson urged that the capital of Virginia be relocated to Richmond for security reasons during the American Revolution. The new lodging for the governor adjacent to the current Virginia State Capitol building in Richmond is more modest in size and style, and is called the Governor's Mansion.

On December 22, 1781, the main building was destroyed by a fire. At the time, it was being used as a hospital for wounded American soldiers following the nearby Siege of Yorktown. Some brick outbuildings survived the fire, but were demolished during the American Civil War so they could be salvaged for building materials by occupying forces.

In the 1880s, as the Chesapeake and Ohio Railway was building the Peninsula Extension east to Newport News, due to difficulties in acquiring right of way along the preferred route, temporary tracks were laid along Main Street/Duke of Gloucester Street in Williamsburg, passing through the area of the former Palace.

== Reconstruction ==
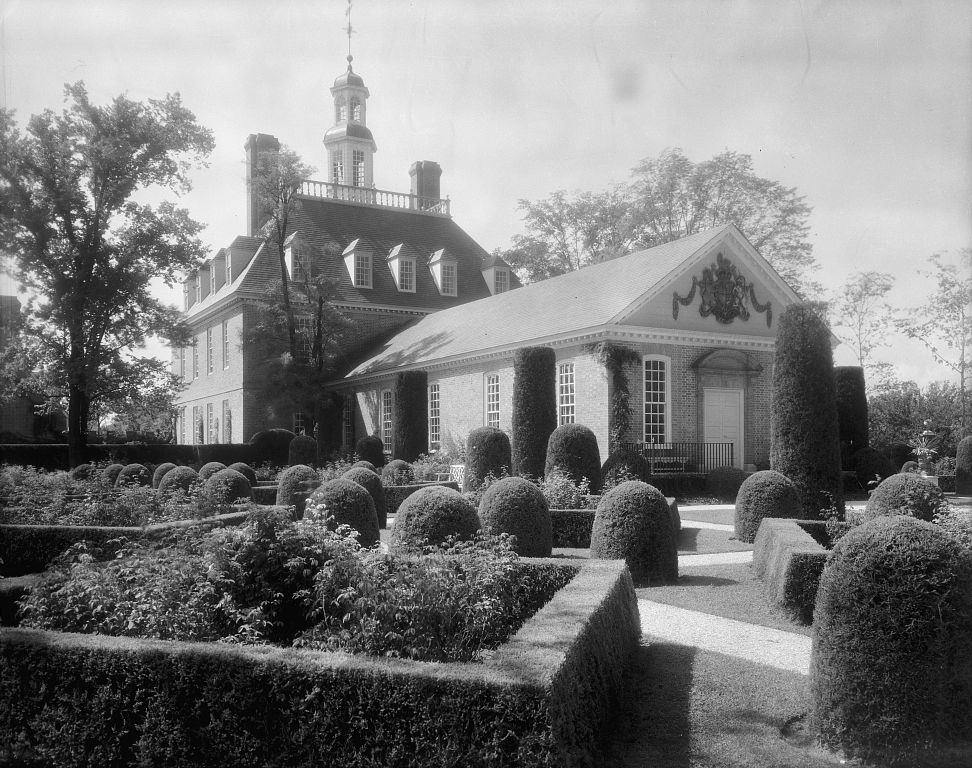
Governor's Palace and gardens shortly after its reconstruction, ca. 1935, Frances Benjamin Johnston.

Through the efforts of Reverend Dr. W.A.R. Goodwin, rector of Bruton Parish Church and philanthropist John D. Rockefeller Jr., whose family provided major funding, the elaborate and ornate palace was carefully recreated in the early 20th century.

The reconstruction was based on numerous surviving pieces of evidence. Archaeological excavations of the site revealed the original foundations and cellar, together with architectural remnants that had fallen in during the fire. Jefferson's drawings and plans from his proposed renovation have survived, conveying the interior plan. In 1929, while the project was already in planning, a copperplate engraving nicknamed the Bodleian Plate was discovered at the University of Oxford's Bodleian Library in England. The plate included renderings c. 1740 of the exterior of the palace, along with the Capitol and the Wren Building. Additional evidence included original artifacts and Virginia General Assembly records. The house, outbuildings, and gardens opened as an exhibition on April 23, 1934.

In early 1981, the Governor's Palace underwent significant interior renovation and refurnishing to reflect updated scholarship of the building and its furnishings. The renovation reduced the influence of the Colonial Revival style in favor of historical evidence, including records found at Badminton House in the UK.
