= Henry Cary Jr. =

American planter and building contractor

- Born: Mid to late 1600s Colonial Virginia
- Died: 18th century
- Occupation: Building contractor
- Years active: ca. 1710 – 1730s
- Known for: Ampthill; St. John's Episcopal Church
- Spouses: Sarah Sclater; Ann Edwards; Elizabeth
- Children: Seven (including Archibald Cary)
- Parent(s): Henry Cary Sr. Judith Lockey Cary

Henry Cary Jr. was an American planter and building contractor, active during the early 1700s.

== Early and family life ==
Cary was born at the Forest plantation in Warwick County, Colonial Virginia around the mid to late 1600s to Henry Cary Sr. and Judith Lockey Cary. There are few surviving records of his early life but it is likely that he learned about contracting through his father, who also worked as a contractor. Cary married three times and had seven children, three with his first wife Sarah Sclater and four with his second wife, Ann Edwards.

== Construction ==
Cary became visibly active in construction after his father's retirement in 1710 and in December 1720 he was authorized to work on the Governor's Palace, in Williamsburg, Virginia, a project that his father had begun but was unable to complete. This was one of several jobs that Cary performed at Williamsburg and in 1726 he was hired to construct new gates for the Capitol.

He went on to oversee the construction of St. John's Episcopal Church in Hampton (1728), and several buildings at the College of William & Mary: a chapel wing (1729) and the President's House (1732). Cary was also likely in charge of constructing the Brafferton building (1723).

Around 1733, Cary moved to a large plantation on the south bank of the James River, just downstream from present day Richmond in Chesterfield County, Virginia, where he built Ampthill, which served as the Cary family home for many generations.

== See also ==
- List of people from Virginia
