= Brafferton (building) =

Historic building in Virginia, US

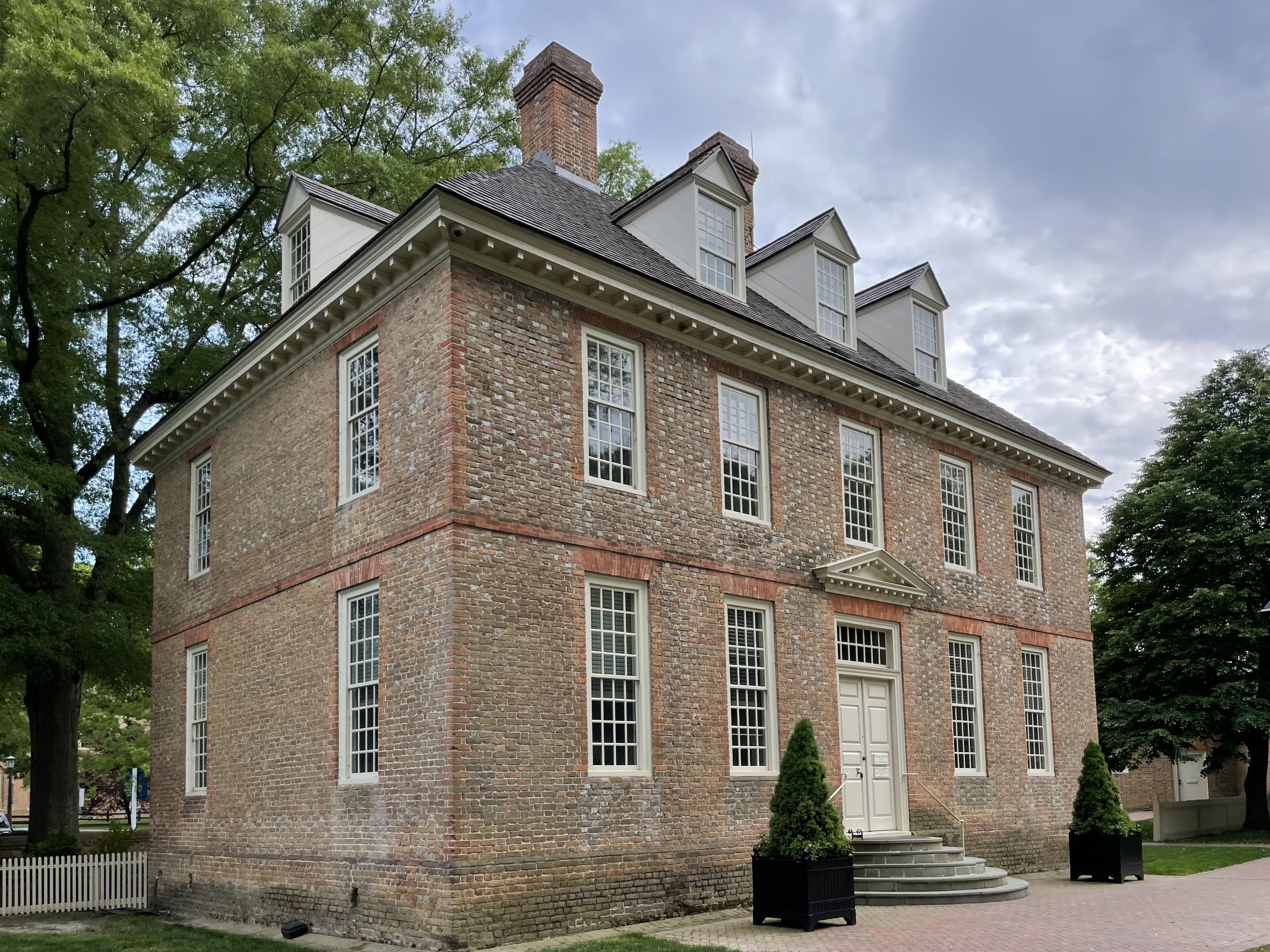
- The Brafferton, seen from Historic Campus
- Interactive map of the Brafferton area

General information
- Location: Williamsburg, Virginia
- Estimated completion: 1723
- Wren Building (Old College Yard, College of William and Mary)
- U.S. National Register of Historic Places
- U.S. National Historic Landmark
- Virginia Landmarks Register
- Location within Virginia
- Coordinates: 37°16′16.4″N 76°42′30″W
- NRHP reference No.: 66000929
- VLR No.: 137-0013

Significant dates
- Added to NRHP: October 15, 1966
- Designated VLR: September 9, 1969
- Owner: College of William & Mary

The Brafferton is a building on the campus of the College of William & Mary in Williamsburg, Virginia. Built in 1723 and among the oldest buildings in Virginia, it was built as a school for Virginian Indians. The Brafferton is southeast of the Wren Building and faces the President's House. The three buildings were restored by the Colonial Williamsburg project during the early 20th century.

== History ==
The Brafferton was constructed in 1723, likely by Henry Cary, Jr., to house the College's Indian school, which was endowed by funds from an estate purchased by the charity of Robert Boyle, the noted English scientist. Income from Brafferton Manor in Yorkshire, England, designated for charitable and pious purposes, was used to "civilize" Indian youth, prepare them for Anglican priesthood — and produce interpreters and cultural liaisons who could aid Britain's colonial expansion. Part of this process was to strip Brafferton students of their native clothes and names, giving them English identities.

The Indian Master lived in the Brafferton with the students and was permitted to take in white students whom he tutored for a fee. The Brafferton was set up with two main floors. On the first floor, there was a classroom with the rest of the floor taken up by the apartment for the Indian Master. On the second floor, the Native American boys slept while taking their meals with the rest of the College in the Great Hall. Eventually, dormers were added to the roof and the boys were moved to the attic while a library took up the second floor, using the Boyle money instead to actually fund the College library.

The undertaking of producing Indian ministers met with little success, except among the Pamunkey. Virginia's efforts to encourage allied and neighboring tribes to send Indian youth to Williamsburg were more successful, and several Brafferton students were key players in the late eighteenth century wars of North America. However, during the American Revolution, income from the Boyle estate was interrupted, and the teenage students mostly engaged in the conflict, the last leaving during the fall of 1778.

While the English tried to ‘civilize’ the Brafferton students, the Indigenous boys never lost their culture. Due to an archaeological dig in 2011, archaeologists pieced together that a wine bottle broke at one point. A Brafferton student picked up this glass and fashioned it into a Native American tool. Even when their culture was being repressed, they were still practicing their culture in private. Eventually, Native American groups started sending their children over in order to learn the ways of the English. “In the end, the Indian School had the opposite effect to the one intended. Instead of convincing Indians to become good Englishmen, it allowed the Indians to learn enough about British culture to defend their old ways of life.”

Boyle monies were reinvested in the College following the Revolution, but discontinued after 1784, partially as a result of a lengthy court case involving the trustees of the Boyle Charity and the College of William & Mary. After the College lost the chancery case, the Indian school was abandoned, and the Boyle money was redirecting to the Caribbean, and still later, to Canada.

The Brafferton was damaged during the American Civil War and the College spent $3,000 for repairs. Throughout the years, the building served as a residence for professors, a dormitory for students, an armory for the Wise Light Infantry, and an alumni office. Additionally, it has temporarily housed other offices, fine arts classes, and even the Music Department for a short period of time.

The building was first refurbished in 1930-31 during the restoration of Colonial Williamsburg.

Since 1985, the Brafferton has housed the offices of the president and the provost of the College. At the request of the Governor's advisory Council on Indians, a state historical marker was erected on the Brafferton grounds in 2005.

Brafferton underwent a restoration in 2010–13, during which time the College of William & Mary established the Brafferton Legacy Group in conjunction with alumni from the school's tribal descendant communities, the Department of Anthropology, the College's American Indian Resource Center, Colonial Williamsburg's (CW) Department of Archaeology, and CW's American Indian Initiative. During the 2013 renovations, the building's 1930s Ludowici roof tiles were replaced with new ones. The tiles were designed to replicate the appearance of historic wood shingles but last for a longer duration.

The College and CW hosted a ground blessing for the start of archaeological investigations at the Indian school, and several Pamunkey tribal members worked on the 2011-12 excavations. The building was rededicated in 2013 with opening remarks in the Cherokee language and honor songs, alongside greetings from the President of William & Mary and College Provost.
