= W. A. R. Goodwin =

American Episcopal clergyman, historian, and author

The Reverend W. A. R. Goodwin
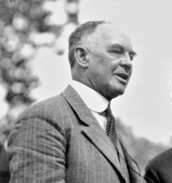
- Goodwin in 1926
- Born: June 18, 1869; Richmond, Virginia, U.S.
- Died: September 7, 1939 (aged 70); Williamsburg, Virginia, U.S.
- Education: Richmond College; Roanoke College Virginia Theological Seminary
- Spouses: Evelyn Tannor (died 1915) Ethel Howard (m. 1918)
- Children: 6
- Parent(s): John Francis Goodwin; Letitia Rutherfoord

Signature
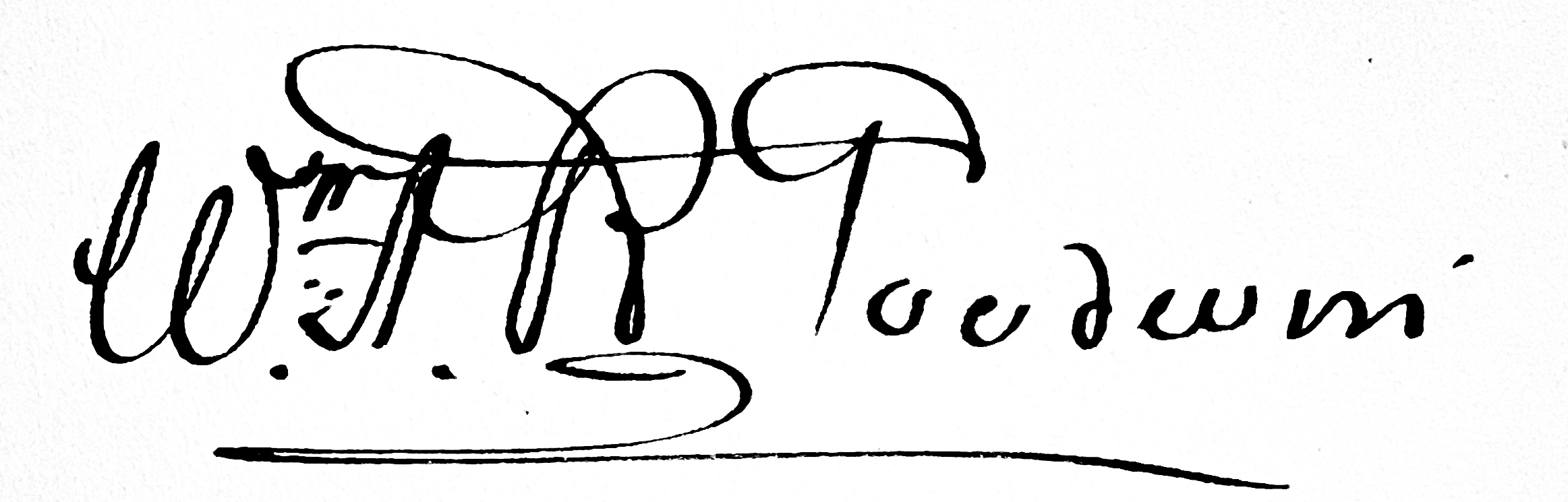

William Archer Rutherfoord Goodwin (June 18, 1869 – September 7, 1939) was an American Episcopal priest, historian, and author. As the rector of Bruton Parish Church, he began the 20th-century preservation and restoration effort which resulted in Colonial Williamsburg in Virginia. He is thus sometimes called "the Father of the Restoration of Colonial Williamsburg."

== Early life and education ==
Goodwin was born in Richmond, Virginia, on June 18, 1869, four years after the end of the American Civil War. His father, John Francis Goodwin, was the son of an Episcopal priest and a Confederate captain who served with General Robert E. Lee at Appomattox Court House near the end of the Civil War. Partly disabled by a war wound, Goodwin became a machinist in Virginia's capital to raise money to restore the family's devastated farm along the eastern edge of the Blue Ridge Mountains.

In 1868, John Francis married Letitia Rutherfoord, who also came from one of the First Families of Virginia, but did not want to become dependent upon his father-in-law. The Rutherfoord home had served as a hospital for Confederate wounded from the battles of Manassas and the Peninsular Campaign. His uncle Thomas was a wealthy and influential merchant in Richmond.

The small family moved to Norwood in Nelson County, Virginia, and later deeper into the Blue Ridge Mountains near Wytheville, where Goodwin was raised along with his two younger sisters. After attending a private school at a local plantation, then the area's first public school, Goodwin began studies at Roanoke College in 1885. He graduated in 1889 with a Bachelor of Arts degree.

After considering a career as a lawyer and working with the Young Men's Christian Association, preaching at a local jail, and some studies at Richmond College in 1890, Goodwin obtained a scholarship at the Virginia Theological Seminary in Alexandria, Virginia. He graduated in 1893 with a divinity degree.

== Career ==
Goodwin was ordained a deacon on June 23, 1893, two months before his father died in Wytheville. He was ordained a priest on July 1, 1894, and served St. John's Church in Petersburg for a decade, during which time the building was rebuilt. Goodwin also taught at the nearby Bishop Payne Divinity School, preventing its absorption into Howard University in Washington D.C., and securing acceptance of its curriculum within the Episcopal Church (in the 1960s it was relocated to Virginia Theology Seminary's main campus in Alexandria).

In 1903, Goodwin became pastor of the historic Bruton Parish Church in Williamsburg, a small city which had served as Virginia's capitol from 1699 until 1780. He soon found that in 1884, the parish's women had formed a preservationist group, which had evolved into the Association for the Preservation of Virginia Antiquities. They had repaired the churchyard's old gravestones, secured the foundation of the colonial Capitol, and acquired the Powder magazine. From Petersburg, Goodwin published A Historical Sketch of Bruton Church, Williamsburg, Virginia.

Aside from the College of William and Mary, founded in the 17th century but suffering financially after the Civil War, time had largely left Williamsburg behind after the General Assembly moved Virginia's Capital to Richmond during the American Revolutionary War. Inspired by his historic parish with its many still-standing 18th-century buildings, Goodwin continued the fund-raising, preservation, and restoration of the aged and historic church building. He traveled along the East Coast soliciting contributions from ordinary people as well as financier J. Pierpont Morgan and the Bishop of London. Using information gathered from town and church records, Goodwin successfully led the completion of the church's restoration in 1907, the 300th anniversary of the establishment of the Episcopal Church in America at nearby Jamestown. In that year, he also published Bruton Parish Church restored and its historic environment.

=== Move to New York ===
In 1909, Goodwin accepted a promotion to another historic church, St. Paul's Episcopal Church in Rochester, New York, founded by Rt. Rev. John Henry Hobart. The parish was wealthier, which helped as he raised his three children (and sent them to boarding schools), particularly after his first wife grew ill and died in 1915. Rev. Goodwin became involved in national church conventions, as well as Rochester's civic affairs, and ministered to soldiers and sailors during World War I.

While in New York, Goodwin gained additional publishing contacts and continued writing. In 1916, E.P. Dutton published his The Church Enchained. In 1921, Morehouse Publishing published his handbook for clergy and laity concerning Episcopal Church practices, for which Bishop Charles Henry Brent wrote the foreword.

In 1918, he courted and married another Virginia belle and started a second family. However, by 1922, Goodwin found himself "inexpressibly mentally tired" and discussed with his bishop his need to find a less demanding position.

=== Return to Virginia ===
Goodwin returned to Virginia full-time in February 1923, after Dr. J.A.C. Chandler, President of the College of William & Mary since 1919, recruited the clergyman to head its biblical literature and religious studies department. Goodwin was also offered a commission of five cents on each fundraising dollar, for the new president knew of the priest's connections and fundraising skills, and planned to build classrooms, labs, dormitories, and athletic facilities as well as capitalize on the college's long history and outstanding remaining architecture. 1923 was the centennial of Virginia Theological Seminary, Goodwin's alma mater, which had also trained other family members. Goodwin through Dutton published the first volume of the two volume history of the seminary, which he began editing in 1914 after researching and delivering an address concerning Virginia's second Bishop, former New Yorker Richard Channing Moore.

Upon returning to Williamsburg, Goodwin also resumed duties as rector of Bruton Parish Church, a position he held until his retirement in 1937.

=== Historic preservation ===
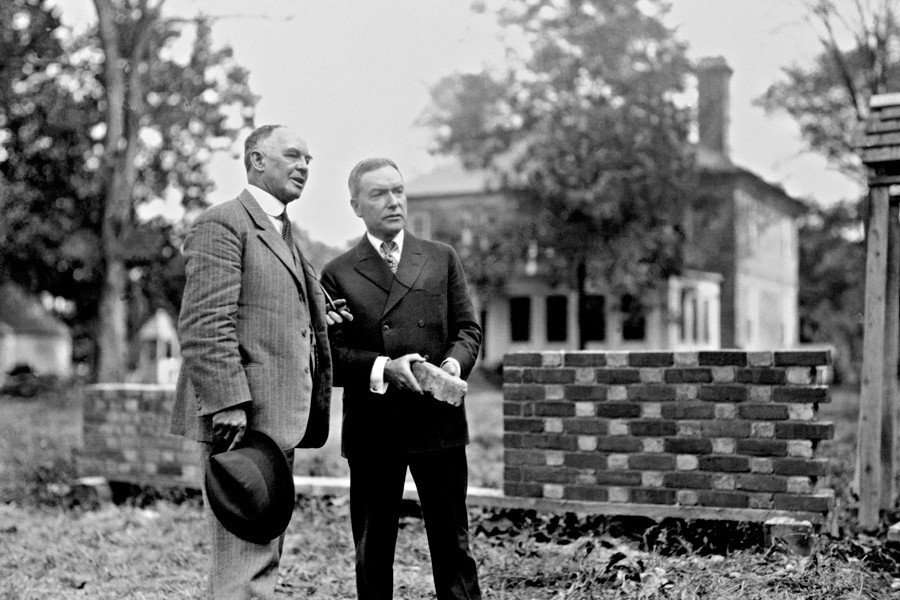
Goodwin (left) with John D. Rockefeller Jr. behind the George Wythe House, November 1926

The deterioration and loss of 17th and 18th-century structures during the years of his absence in New York shocked Goodwin and galvanized him into action. In 1924, fearing that the many other historic buildings in the area would be destroyed, Goodwin began a movement to preserve the district's remaining colonial-era buildings.

Goodwin used his contacts in New York and Philadelphia to revitalize the town as well as the college. In particular, he convinced John D. Rockefeller Jr. and his wife, Abby Aldrich Rockefeller, to help restore the historic town and stimulated their generosity, which financed its restoration and reuse as a living history museum. Working with a small group of confidantes, Goodwin acted as Rockefeller's straw buyer and acquired dozens of properties located in and near what would become the restored area. Williamsburg attorney Vernon M. Geddy, Sr. did much of the title research and legal work and later drafted the Virginia corporate papers for the project and filed them with the Virginia State Corporation Commission. Mr. Geddy served briefly as the first President of the Colonial Williamsburg Foundation.

Together, the local team and the New York-based Rockefellers made Goodwin's dream of restoring the old colonial capital come true, creating what grew to become Colonial Williamsburg. A public announcement finally revealed the Rockefellers' role at two town meetings in the historic city held in June 1928.

== Personal life ==
Goodwin was married to Evelyn Tannor (1869–1915). Together, they were the parents of:

- Evelyn Goodwin (1896–1977), who married Barclay Harding Farr (1890–1976), the headmaster of Allendale School.
- Mary Katherine Goodwin (b. 1899), who married George Candee Buell (b. 1893), son of George Clifford Buell, in 1920.
- Thomas Rutherfoord Le Baron Goodwin (1901–1962), who married Mary Nash Tatem in 1925. He later married Mary Randolph Mordecai (1906–1990) in 1940.

After his first wife died in 1915, he married Ethel Howard (1887–1954), the daughter of John Clarke Howard, in 1918. They were the parents of:

- Edward Howard Goodwin (1919–2010), who married Alice Barraud Cocke (1920–2010) in 1942.
- William Archer Rutherfoord Goodwin Jr. (1921–1943), who died during the allied invasion of Sicily in World War II.
- John Seton Goodwin.

Goodwin died in Williamsburg in 1939 and was buried in his beloved parish church. His widow died in 1954.

== Legacy ==
Today Colonial Williamsburg's Historic Area occupies 173 acres (700,000 m^{2}) and includes 88 original buildings and more than 50 major reconstructions. It is joined by the Colonial Parkway to the two other sides of the Historic Triangle.

At Jamestown, in 1607, England established its first permanent colony in the Americas. At Yorktown in 1781, the Continental Army under George Washington won a decisive victory during the American Revolutionary War to end British rule.

Virginia's Historic Triangle area is a major tourist attraction, with Goodwin's Bruton Parish Church and Colonial Williamsburg as the centerpiece.

== See also ==
- Colonial Williamsburg
