= Campus of the College of William & Mary =

College campus in Virginia, US

Coordinates: 37°16′15″N 76°42′33″W

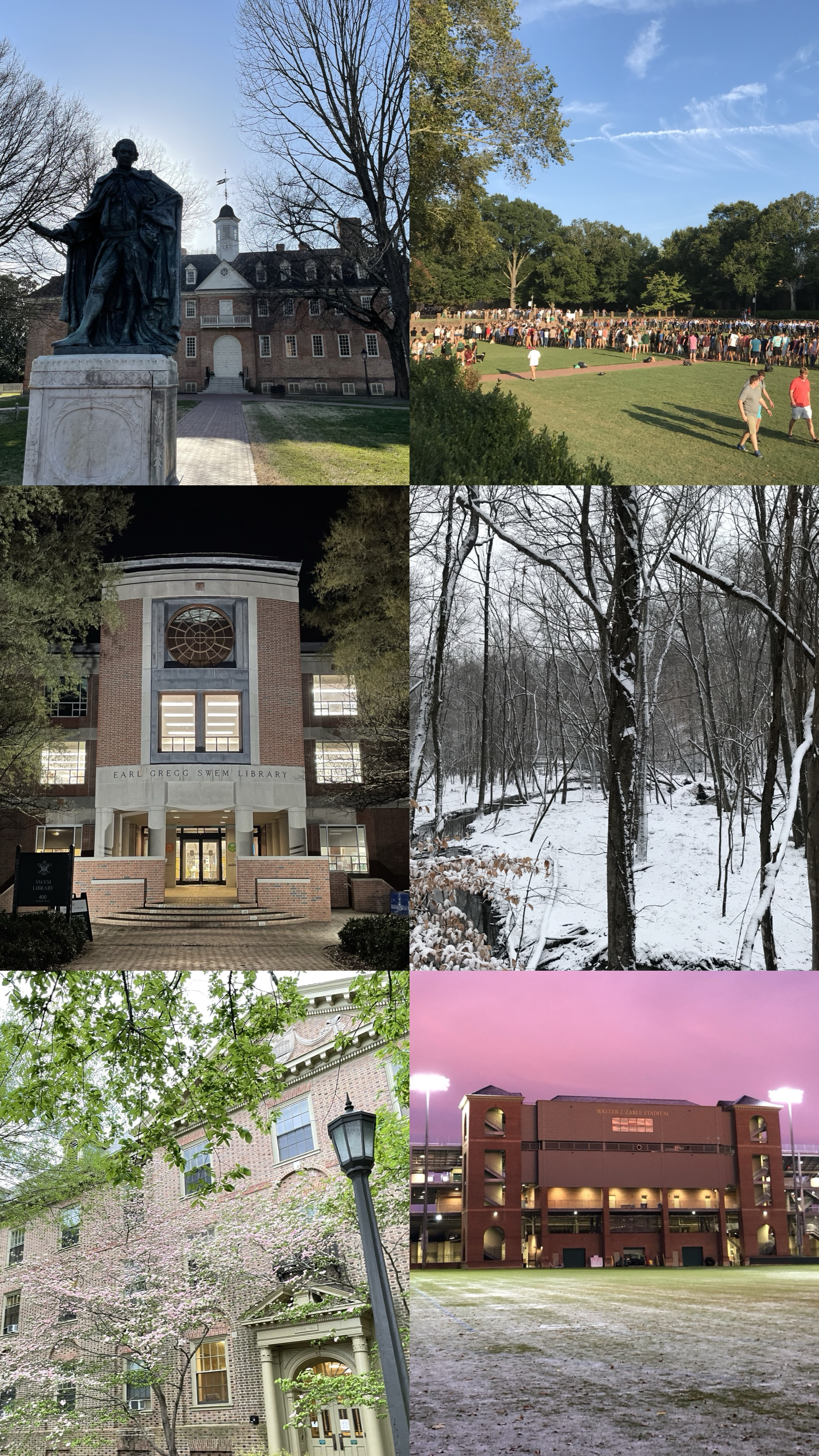
Clockwise from top left: statue of Lord Botetourt in front of the Wren Building, Sunken Garden, College Woods, Zable Stadium, Monroe Hall, Swem Library

The College of William & Mary has maintained a campus in what is now Williamsburg, Virginia, since 1693. The cornerstone of the Wren Building, then known as the College Building and the oldest surviving academic building in the United States, was laid in 1695. The college's 18th-century campus includes the College Building, the President's House, and Brafferton–all of which were constructed using slave labor. These buildings were altered and damaged during the succeeding centuries before receiving significant restorations by the Colonial Williamsburg program during the 1920s and 1930s.

Additional construction and acquisitions have developed and expanded the college's Williamsburg campus in the 19th, 20th, and 21st centuries. Through the 1920s and 1930s, Charles M. Robinson and his associates designed a number of Colonial Revival buildings on what is now the college's Old Campus. Additional construction later in the century created New Campus. Recent additions to the Williamsburg campus include buildings for the college's Law School, School of Education, and Mason School of Business.

William & Mary has maintained campuses outside of Williamsburg since 1925. The Colleges of William & Mary integrated William & Mary and four other campuses into a university system in the early 1960s; only Richard Bland College remains affiliated. A campus for the college's Virginia Institute of Marine Science (VIMS) graduate school is located in Gloucester Point site. VIMS also maintains a laboratory in Wachapreague and a research facility along the Rappahannock River.

== History ==
=== 17th and 18th centuries ===
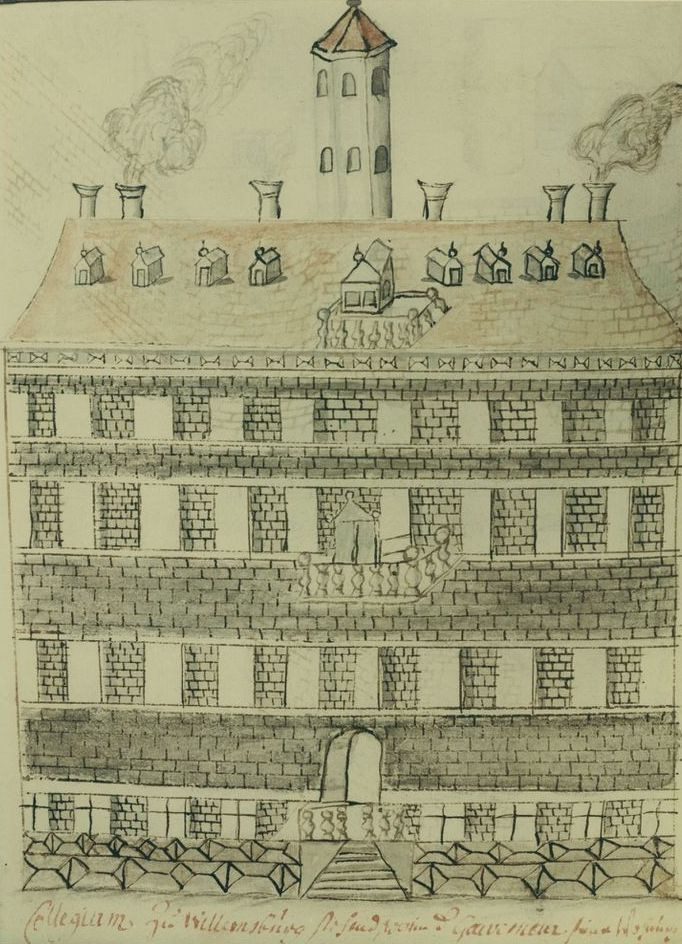
The earliest known drawing of the College Building, by Swiss traveler Franz Ludwig Michel, 1702

On February 8, 1693, King William III of England and Queen Mary II granted a royal charter that established the College of William & Mary in Virginia and made James Blair the first president of the college. Blair returned to the Colony of Virginia in October that year and the Virginia General Assembly began debating the location of the new college's campus. The assembly selected Middle Plantation, a spot roughly equidistant between the York River and James River on the Virginia Peninsula. Middle Plantation lay between two palisades, with the campus site just west of the second, 1633-authorized fortification which ran from Queen's Creek to Archer's Hope Creek (now known as College Creek). The college trustees purchased 330 acres from Thomas Ballard for £170 and assigned Thomas Hadley to begin developing a portion of the property.

Some of the college's early funds were devoted to restoring a degraded Middle Plantation schoolhouse that likely hosted William & Mary's first classes. Daniel Parke Jr. was given a contract to produce around 800,000 bricks. Construction was stalled by "intrigue", which Blair attributed to Virginia governor and opponent to the college Edmund Andros. Despite political resistance, the cornerstone of the College Building, now known as the Wren Building, (Note: Also called the Main Building.) was laid on August 8, 1695. (Note: Governor Andros and others in Jamestown put up stubborn resistance to the college's establishment. However, as the college was named for the King and Queen, Andros was obliged to accept with "poor grace" the public duty of participating in the cornerstone ceremony.)

Blair had contracted Hadley while in England, bringing both plans and construction materials with them to Virginia. Planned as a quadrangle, only the north and east wings were built. The College Building's construction involved English masons, indentured servants, and enslaved persons. The enslaved persons, owned by the contractor, were assigned the hard labor. In 1724, Hugh Jones wrote that the College Building was "first modeled by Sir Christopher Wren". Since then, Wren's supposed involvement in the building's design has been the subject of lengthy debate. The College Building was completed in 1697. It thought to have originally been three stories tall and topped with a two-story cupola. Swiss traveler Franz Ludwig Michel executed the earliest known surviving depiction of the College Building in 1702.

Opposition to Andros in England led to him being recalled and replaced by Francis Nicholson as colonial governor in 1698. After the statehouse in Jamestown burned in October 1698, both Nicholson and Blair supported moving the capital from the Jamestown to Middle Plantation. A series of orations were given at the college on May Day 1699 before a crowd which included government officials. One of these orations, possibly sponsored by Nicholson, persuaded those assembled to move the capital to the college's community. The move was passed by assembly in June and Middle Plantation was reestablished as a city named Williamsburg. Nicholson planned the city like he had at Annapolis, Maryland, and extended a nearly mile-long street named for the Duke of Gloucester from the College Building on its western terminus to the new Capitol (constructed 1701–1705).

The college's Board of Visitors offered the College Building as a host for all branches of Virginia's government until the Capitol was completed. This offer was accepted and the College Building served as a statehouse from October 1700 until April 1704. During the night of October 29–30, 1705, the College Building burned. The library and furnishings were destroyed, as were scientific instruments donated by John Locke. Queen Anne donated £500, which was enough to clear the burnt remains of the building, and John Tullitt purchased the lumber rights to the college's properties for £2000. Additional funds being required, the Queen donated another £500 in 1710. Governor Alexander Spotswood, knowledgeable about architecture, sponsored the reconstruction. The College Building rebuilding was completed in 1715 to a design credited to Spotswood. The 1715 rebuild was two and a half-stories tall and featured a possibly shorter cupola. The Bodleian Plate depicts this iteration of the structure with three stories of full masonry and a loggia.

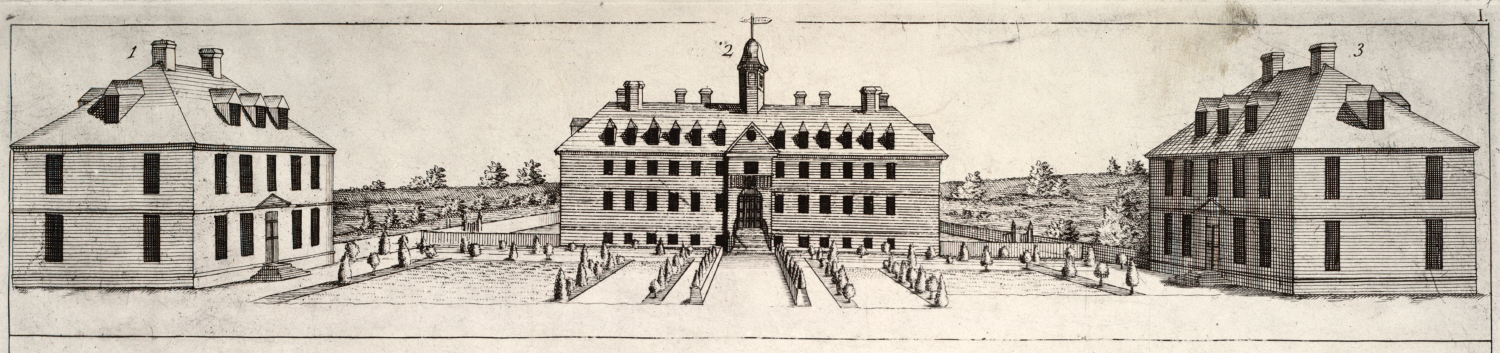
The College Yard on the Bodleian Plate, a copperplate engraving dated to c. 1732–1747. Left to right: Brafferton, College Building, and President's House

The Brafferton was built in 1723 south of the College Building to support the college's Indian school. It was renovated in 1734 to accommodate dormers, provide for a library on the second floor, and add living space to the third floor. Henry Cary Jr. designed the President's House, which was built to the College Building's north in 1732–1733. The College Building's chapel and south wing were completed in 1732. By the early 18th century, the College Yard containing these structures was walled, as depicted on the Bodleian Plate. A garden that may have been designed by James Road, the gardener at Hampton Court Palace, remained into the 1770s.

With only occasional repairs, the College Building remained roughly unchanged until the American Revolutionary War. In 1772, Thomas Jefferson drew a plan to expand the building and make it a complete quadrangle; pre-Revolution events stalled this project before much work was done. (Note: A 1950 excavation between the Wren Building and Ewell Hall discovered the foundations of this proposed expansion.) During the 1781 Yorktown campaign of the war, British general Charles Cornwallis occupied the President's House in June. From that fall until summer the next year, the College Building was used as a hospital by French troops. The President's House was a hospital for French officers from October to December 1781, when it was accidentally burned; the French government paid to rebuild it.

Jefferson, who had graduated from William & Mary, referred to the college as "rude, misshapen pile" reminiscent of a brick kiln in his 1787 Notes on the State of Virginia. When planning construction for the University of Virginia, Jefferson considered risks such as fire and disease in having all a university's functions within a single building, as was the case at William & Mary. Instead, he would support a plan for an "Academical Village" comprising a complex arranged "around an open square of grass and trees". (Note: While Jefferson contemplated making William & Mary a public university after the Revolution, the college remained private until 1906.)

=== 19th century ===
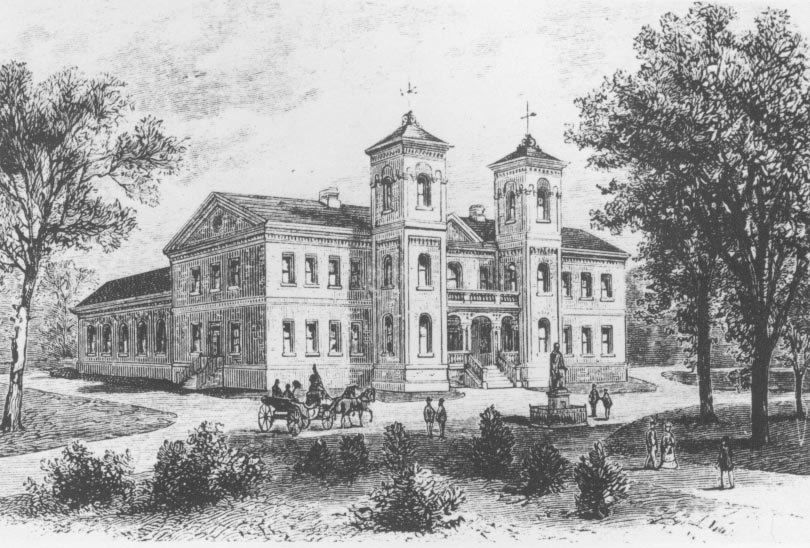
The College Building as it appeared from 1859 to 1862 with Italianate towers

A tornado damaged the Brafferton in 1834; it was heavily renovated in 1849. The College Building burned again in 1859, destroying marble tablets in the chapel, the library, and scientific equipment. It was rebuilt and opened to students by October that year. The reconstruction was to a new Italianate design by Henry Exall and Eban Faxon. This short-lived design sported two three-story towers and enclosed the loggia.

The American Civil War saw the campus host troops from both the Confederacy (which the college supported) and the Union. As Confederates arrived in the city, the College Building was used as a barracks. The night prior to the Battle of Williamsburg, a Confederate brigade was posted behind the College Building. On the day of the battle–May 5, 1862–Confederate troops were held in reserve on the campus; rear guard commander General James Longstreet utilized the campus for his headquarters during the battle. Immediately following the battle, the campus served as hospitals for the wounded.

The college and Williamsburg came under Union occupation following the battle, with pickets just beyond the campus. Until 1864, the city and campus were on the de facto border between the Confederacy and Union. A Confederate cavalry raid briefly seized the town from the Union on September 9, 1862, but soon withdrew. In retaliation, troops from the Union's 5th Pennsylvania Cavalry Regiment burned the College Building that afternoon. Another Confederate raid fought Union pickets on the campus in 1863. Defensive trenches were dug along the campus, with windows and entrances facing the Confederate lines bricked up. The Brafferton housed Union officers during the occupation. Following the war's conclusion, the President's House was used by Union soldiers stationed there to oversee Reconstruction.

An addition was made to the President's House in 1865 to house professors while awaiting the College Building's reconstruction. Rebuilt between 1867 and 1869, the College Building's walls had survived the previous fires which allowed their reuse in this "more sober" rebuilding that featured a wider center pavilion, no towers, and a small cupola. Alfred L. Rives's design removed the Italianate frontispiece in favor of a three-bay pedimented pavilion. The façade's center bay featured an arcaded loggia. The college purchased ten acres on the former site of the Governor's Palace in 1870, building a brick schoolhouse on the site using funds from Mary Whaley, who wished to commemorate her late son Mattey. From 1882 until 1888, college operations were suspended. College president Benjamin Stoddert Ewell rang the College Building's bell through these "silent years", an act that according to tradition "maintained the royal charter and kept the college alive". William & Mary reopened in 1888, by which point the Brafferton had suffered substantial damage from sitting empty. The Wren Chapel's styling became Victorian by the 1890s.

=== 20th century ===
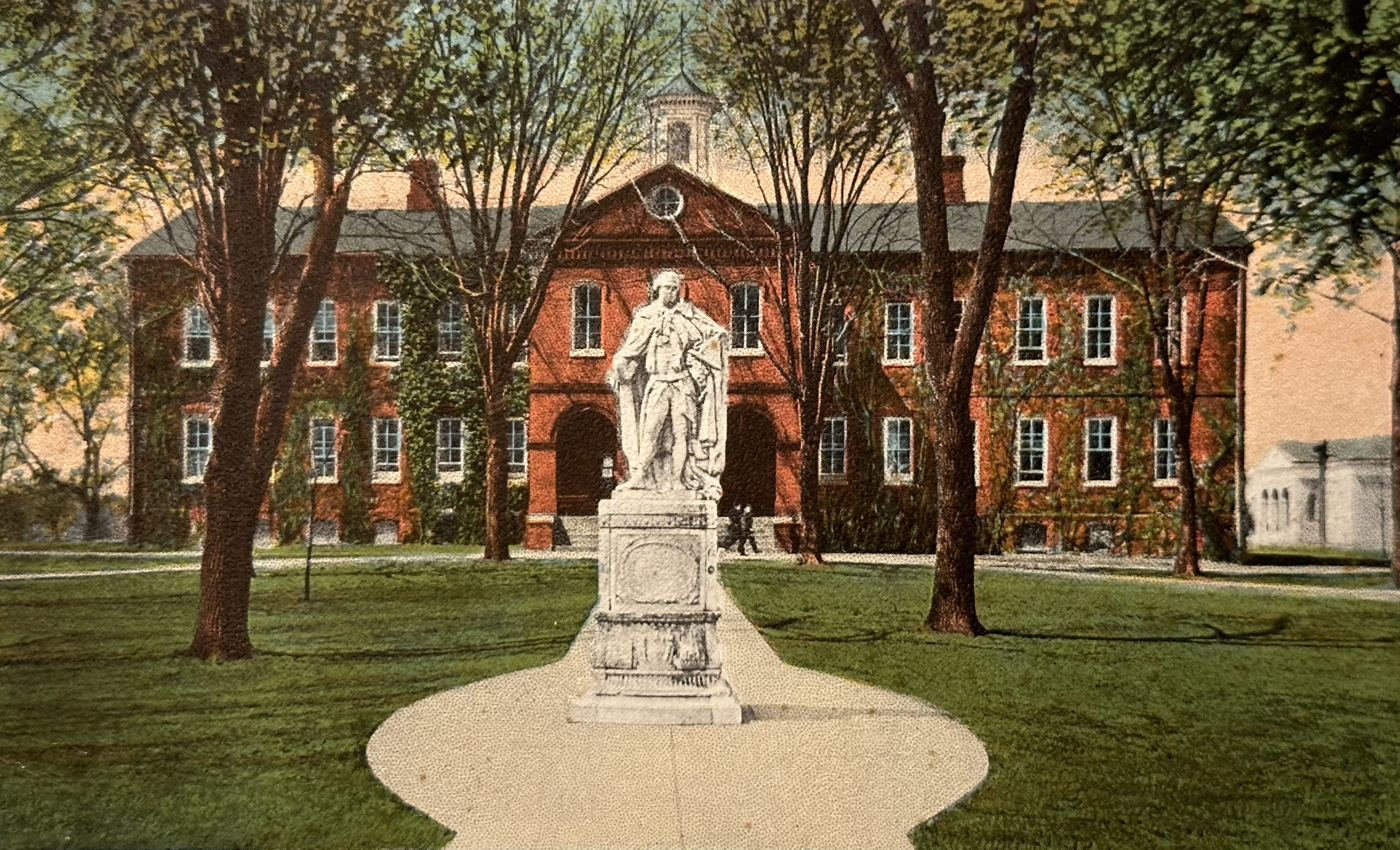
College Building and Lord Botetourt statue, c. 1905–1926

In the early 20th century, president Lyon Gardiner Tyler initiated a campaign to develop and expand the college's campus; in 1906, William & Mary had become a public university of the Commonwealth of Virginia. The subsequent growth required substantial fundraising, exemplified by Tyler financing the construction of a new library (built 1908–1909, now Tucker Hall) by raising $20,000 (equivalent to $716,667 in 2025) to attain a matching Carnegie Foundation donation. Tyler also oversaw the construction of a greenhouse (built 1909) near the College Building and the Tyler Hall dormitory (built 1916, now the Reves Center) on the corner of Jamestown Road and Boundary Street.

In 1903, Episcopal priest W. A. R. Goodwin accepted his assignment to Bruton Parish Church in Williamsburg on the condition that he would be able to restore the church to its colonial appearance. This restoration began in 1905, but Goodwin hoped that a similar program could be adopted throughout the city as a means to teach visitors about the 18th century and to rekindle their Americanism. After returning to Williamsburg from a rectorate in Rochester, New York, in 1923, Goodwin–also a professor of biblical literature and religious education at the college–set about seeking a financial backer for his vision of a restored Williamsburg. He met wealthy philanthropist John D. Rockefeller Jr. at a Phi Beta Kappa dinner in New York City in 1924 (Phi Beta Kappa had been founded at William & Mary). Goodwin asked Rockefeller to support the construction of the college's Phi Beta Kappa Memorial Hall (now Ewell Hall). At the dedication for the for Phi Beta Kappa Memorial Hall in 1926, Goodwin pressed Rockefeller to consider a city-wide restoration. (Note: This iteration of Phi Beta Kappa Hall sustained a severe fire in 1953.) After further deliberation and planning, Rockefeller hired architects Perry, Shaw & Hepburn to plan a restoration spanning the length of Duke of Gloucester Street.

Claiming to be purchasing property on behalf of William & Mary so the college could preserve historic sites in Williamsburg and without revealing Rockefeller's involvement, Goodwin acquired large portions of the city for the planned Colonial Williamsburg. Rockefeller had originally considered giving the restored Williamsburg to the college, but his concerns that Colonial Williamsburg could suffer from future political pressures precluded him from transferring the project to a public institution. The cooperation of the college with the Colonial Williamsburg restoration proved integral in successfully displaying the city in a more accurate 18th-century context.

The Colonial Williamsburg restorations of the three main College Yard buildings–all designed by Perry, Shaw & Hepburn–began in 1928 with the College Building. For both the College Building and Brafferton, the restoration involved stripping the structures to little more than their brick exteriors and installing steel reinforcements. The College Building was renamed the Wren Building in 1931. The Citizenship Building, a former gymnasium located between the Wren Building and the 1926-opened Phi Beta Kappa Memorial Hall, was torn down after the Wren Building's restorations were completed. The Mattey School, which was jointly owned by the college and the Williamsburg school system and had been operated by the college as a training school for teachers from 1894, was sold to the Colonial Williamsburg in 1929. As part of the arrangement, the college and Williamsburg would jointly own the new Matthew Whaley School (built 1930) at the intersection of Scotland Street and Nassau Street and continue using it to train teachers.

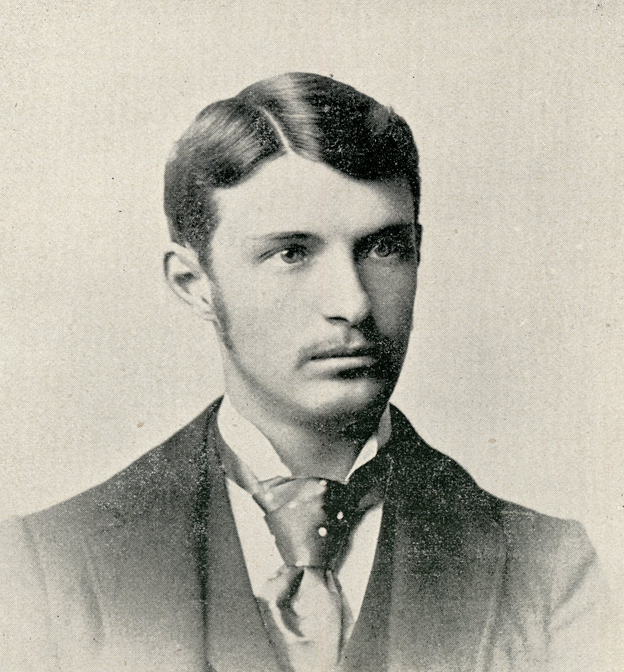
Charles M. Robinson (pictured in 1896) created a master plan for the college's campus.

College president J. A. C. Chandler oversaw the expansion of the campus's facilities after the college wentcoeducational in 1918. From July 1919, Chandler sought to purchase land from the adjacent Bright Farm to the campus's west. Of the farm's 284 acres, 274 acres were purchased by the college in 1923, with the rest of the acreage and the farm's house acquired later. Charles M. Robinson, an architect with a background in designing schools elsewhere in the commonwealth, and his firm designed Jefferson Hall (built 1920–1924), the first purpose-build dormitory for women. They also designed Monroe Hall (opened 1920). (Note: Jefferson Hall was gutted in a fire in January 1983.) In 1925, Chandler contracted Robinson to produce a master plan for the campus; the plan was followed for 25 years. Robinson designed the Sunken Garden around which he placed Old Campus's Colonial Revival halls, including Blair, Rogers (now Chancellors), and Washington Halls. With his junior partner John Binford Walford, Robinson further designed additional Old Campus halls, all built between 1925 and 1930. Robinson died in 1932 and was succeeded by Walford. Walford and D. Pendleton Wright designed the conservative but still modern Phi Beta Kappa Memorial Hall (built 1956) on New Campus, beginning a new, modern architectural period at the college.

In 1938–1939, architects Eero Saarinen, Ralph Rapson, and Frederic James won a competition to design the American National Theater and Academy's new National Festival Theater. Modernist in design–without precedent at on the college's campus–the complex would have ringed the ravine now named Crim Dell but went unbuilt. Eleven lodges capable of housing seven students each were built on the campus in 1947–1948. Between Old and New Campus, they were used by fraternities and popular as housing with upperclassmen. Lodges 1, 3, and 5 were demolished for the construction of what is now the Sadler Center in 1994.

Campus Center opened opposite of main campus on Jamestown Road in 1960. While built with facilities for campus publications and the WCWM radio station, it had become overcrowded by 1980. In 1983, the nearby former dining area of Trinkle Hall was renovated as office space and connected to Campus Center. The 1970s saw college president Thomas Ashley Graves Jr. expand upon socially liberal dormitory policies, improve campus housing, and establish student-interest housing. The construction of the large concrete exterior of William & Mary Hall began in 1969. Replacing Blow Hall as the main athletic facility, William & Mary Hall hosted its first game in December 1970 and was dedicated in 1971. The arena area was renamed to Kaplan Arena in 2005; the remainder of the building adopted that name in 2016.

William & Mary affiliated with the Richmond School of Social Work and Public Health, later renamed the Richmond Professional Institute, in 1925. The core campus of Virginia Commonwealth University, the institute's independent successor, comprises property purchased by Chandler and the Richmond division's director, H. H. Hibbs, between 1925 and 1929. The popularity of the college's extension classes in Norfolk led to the opening of a campus there in September 1930. This division became independent in 1962 as Old Dominion University. The General Assembly approved The Colleges of William & Mary in 1960 as a reorganization of William & Mary and its affiliates in Richmond and Norfolk. It also added campuses at Petersburg, which became Richard Bland College, and Newport News, which became Christopher Newport University. The Colleges of William & Mary university system was disestablished in 1962. All but the Richard Bland College campus would become independent institutions. The Virginia Marine Laboratory was established in Yorktown in the 1940s before moving to Gloucester Point. William & Mary, the University of Virginia, and Virginia Tech all offered degree programs at the laboratory; the latter two university's programs were discontinued in the 1970s. The Gloucester Point became part of William & Mary as the Virginia Institute of Marine Science (VIMS) in 1979.

Governor Linwood Holton pressed the college to convince the National Center for State Courts (NCSC) to relocate to William & Mary in the 1970s. While the effort succeeded, the American Bar Association threatened to withdraw its accreditation of the William & Mary Law School if the college's facilities–particularly its library–were not improved. The law school's dean, William Spong Jr., secured a site had a mile away from the main campus and adjacent to the new NCSC location. The law school's new location–boasting a library, academic facilities, and moot court space–was dedicated in 1980.

=== 21st century ===
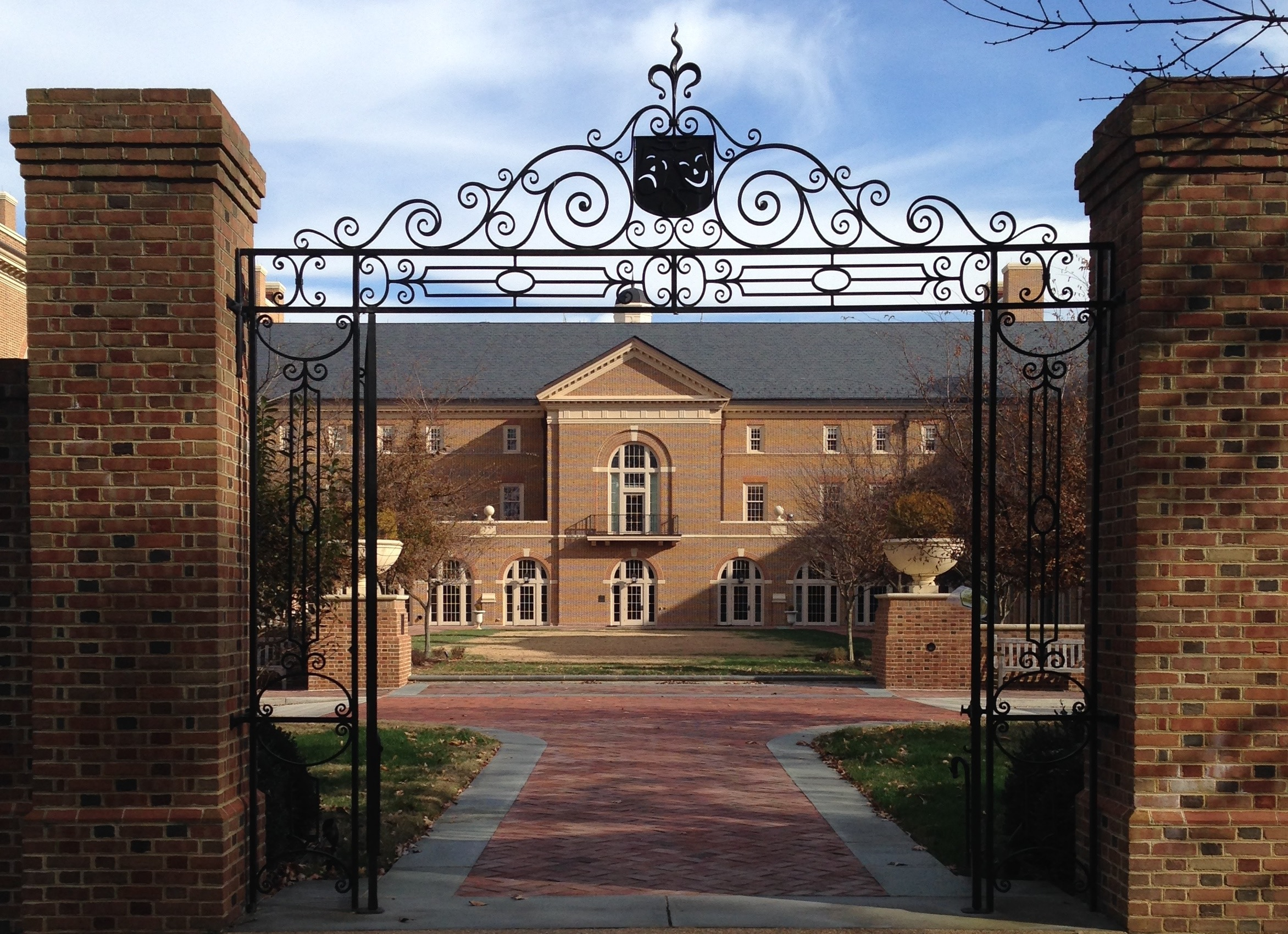
The western face of Alan B. Miller Hall, opened in 2009

An expansion and renovation of Swem Library, which included the installation of an 800-pound Honduran mahogany window bearing the library's logo, ended in February 2005. Preston Hall, which housed the Japanese, Chinese, and Arabic residence houses, burned down on the afternoon of May 3, 2005, with no injuries. In 2006, large residence halls were built on part of the Barksdale Fields in a style similar to other older dormitories along Landrum Drive. A recreational center addition was also completed in 2006. The Jimmye Laycock Football Center, containing facilities for the football team, was under construction in 2007.

In August 2009, the Integrated Science Center (ISC) opened for classes. The 2008 portion was the first part of an originally three-part renovation to construct the ISC along Landrum Drive; construction on ISC IV, inspired by the 1920s buildings along the Sunken Garden, began in 2023. Alan B. Miller Hall was constructed for the Mason School of Business and designed by Robert A.M. Stern Architects, opening to students in August 2009 after two years of construction. Miller Hall, which borders the College Woods to its west, received LEED certification in 2010. In 2010, the School of Education moved from Jones Hall to a newly constructed building on the former site of the Williamsburg Community Hospital along Monticello Avenue. The remaining 1940s lodges, with the exception of one housing a cafe, were torn down in 2016 to allow the construction of the McLeod Tyler Wellness Center.

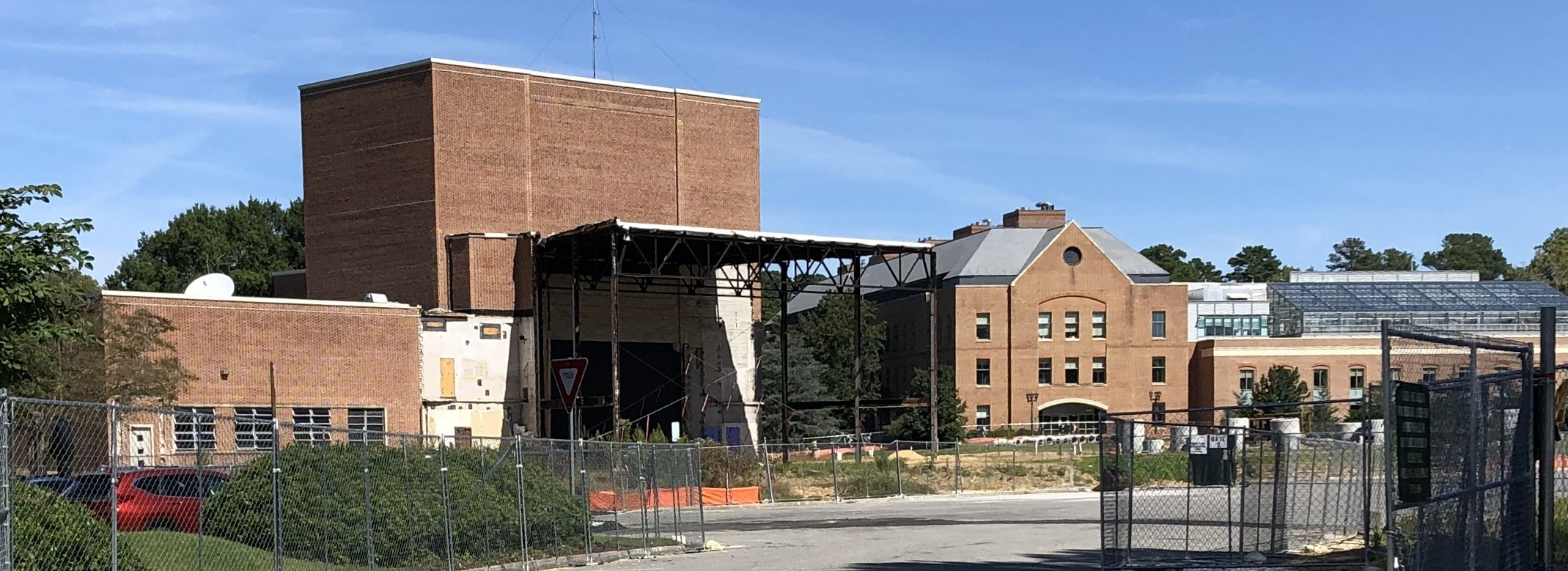
Phi Beta Kappa Memorial Hall (under partial demolition, left) and the Integrated Science Center, September 2019

In 2020, Trinkle Hall, named for Virginia governor and Jim Crow law-backer Elbert Lee Trinkle, on the Williamsburg campus was renamed to Unity Hall and Maury Hall, named for Confederate States Navy admiral Matthew Fontaine Maury, on the Gloucester Point campus was renamed to York River Hall. In April 2021, the college renamed a number of buildings, locations, and departments that had been named for racists in the wake of the George Floyd protests. Among name changes were Morton Hall renamed Boswell Hall, Taliaferro Hall became Willis Sr. Hall, and Tyler Hall reverted to Chancellors Hall. (Note: Morton Hall was renamed for John Boswell, an LGBTQ+ advocate who graduated from the college in 1969; white supremacist Richard Lee Morton had been a history professor at the college. Taliaferro Hall was renamed for the college's first Black student, Hulon L. Willis Sr.; William Booth Taliaferro had been a general in the Confederate States Army. Tyler Hall had been previously renamed from Chancellors' Hall in 1988 to honor U.S. president John Tyler and his segregationist son, Lyon Gardiner Tyler; it was renamed back to Chancellors' Hall with support from Lyon Gardiner Tyler's son. Cary Field at Zable Stadium had originally been named for both T. Archibald Cary and his Confederate officer father, John Cary; after the announcement, the field's name would only honor the former. The arcade at Zable Stadium was named for Arthur Matsu, the first Asian-American student at the college.) Despite recommendation from the working group, Benjamin Stoddert Ewell's name was retained on Ewell Hall. (Note: Ewell is buried on the college campus.)

Demolition on the 1950s Phi Beta Kappa Memorial Hall began in 2019 but was stalled by funding limitations. The renovated PBK Hall and a new music building, comprising the Fine and Performing Arts Complex, opened in 2023. The renovated PBK Hall proscenium theater and lab theater seat 492 and 100 respectively, while the new studio theatre and dance recital theater seat 250 and 60 respectively. The new music building includes a 450-seat concert hall and 125-seat recital hall.

== Williamsburg campus ==
William & Mary's Williamsburg campus is subdivided into several areas. The Old College Yard at the west end of Duke of Gloucester Street comprises the Wren Building, Brafferton, and President's House. Old Campus is defined as the area between Jamestown Road and Richmond Road west of the College Yard, east of Landrum Drive. New Campus spans the area between Jamestown Road and Richmond Roads east of Old Campus. South Campus, which includes the William & Mary Law School, is found along South Henry Street south of Newport Avenue. Though the two large residential buildings were abandoned and later demolished, the college's baseball team still plays at Plumeri Park at the Dillard Complex about three miles from main campus. The campus of Providence Academy in Plymouth, Minnesota, is based on the Williamsburg campus design.

On several occasions, the college has acquired preexisting buildings and used them as part of its Williamsburg campus. The Alumni House, formerly known as the Bright House for a farm that previously occupied the site, is adjacent to the modern Cary Field. The building served as the fraternity house for Kappa Alpha Order before being modified as apartments let to faculty following the Second World War. It was renovated again in 1972 as the Alumni House and further enlarged in 1997 and 2018–2020. The Prince George House and Brown Hall were both acquired from Methodist missionaries in the 1930s. After investigations revealed the Prince George House was the first home of the Williamsburg Bray School in the 18th century, it was transferred to the Colonial Williamsburg Foundation and moved to its historic area for restoration in 2023. (Note: The Prince George House, also known as the Dudley Digges House, was built in 1760. It was also named Brown Hall when it was used as a privately held Methodist women's dorm before being moved to allow the second Brown Hall to be built on the original Boundary Street site.) The Hospitality House hotel (known on campus as "Ho House") on Richmond Road across from Zable Stadium was acquired by the college and renamed One Tribe Place in 2013. A former Days Inn on Richmond Road was purchased in 2016 and opened as Richmond Hall in 2017.

Campus residences include apartment-style housing in the Randolph Complex, Ludwell, and Tribe Square. Freshman housing includes the Botetourt Complex and Green and Gold Village. Dining is spread across several facilities. There are three dining halls: Commons Dining Hall, Marketplace, and Food Hall @ Sadler. The campus dining services operates two shops, one in the Commons and another in the Sadler Center. Restaurant and cafe dining are located in the Swem Library, Integrated Science Center, and Miller Hall.

=== Old College Yard ===
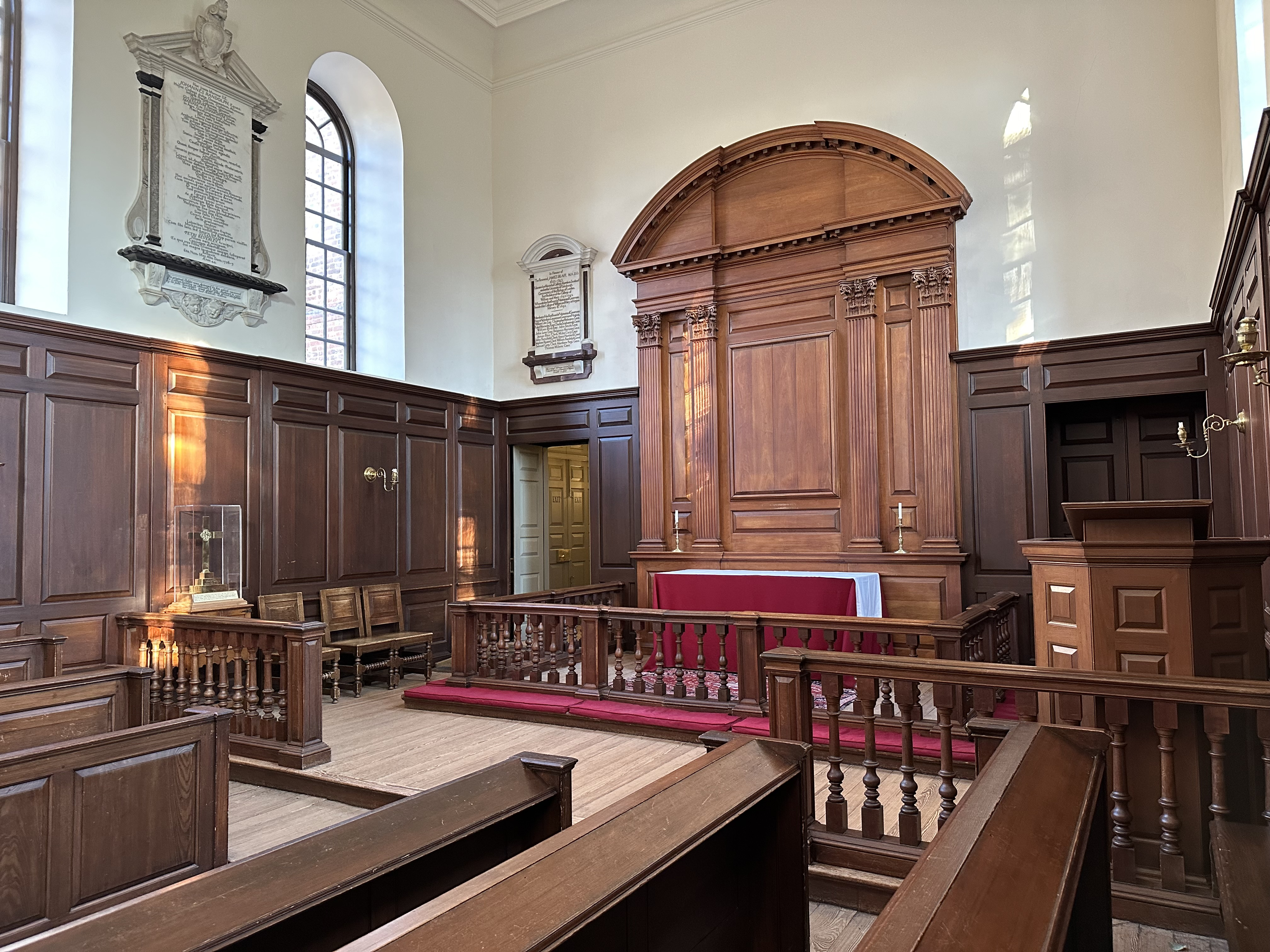
The restored Wren Chapel is used by student ministries for worship. The Wren Cross is visible in its display case (left).

The triangular portion of campus in which the 18th-century Sir Christopher Wren Building, Brafferton, and President's House are located has been variously referred to as the Colonial Campus, the (Old) College Yard, and Historic Campus. It is partially enclosed by a brick wall and a picket fence. The Brafferton, originally constructed in 1723 and restored in 1931–1932, is to the Wren Building's south. The President's House, built in 1732–1733 and restored in 1931, is north of the Wren Building (renamed from the College Building in 1931). The college announced in 2023 that it would perform renovations to Historic Campus as preparations for the United States Semiquincentennial in 2026. The plans were announced following a 2022 assessment of William & Mary's historic buildings by the Colonial Williamsburg Foundation. Construction on the Wren Building was planned to commence at the end of the 2023–2024 school year.

The Wren Building had introduced Georgian architecture to Virginia; Both flanking structures share an Anglo-American gentry style known as Georgian house symmetrical, typified by a structure with at least two stories, one or two rooms on either side, and a central passageway with a staircase. The original College Yard three-building arrangement emulated Georgian domestic ensembles. The President's House is the oldest official college residence in the United States. Since it was built, only one president of the college has not resided within it. It was built to a similar form-factor as the Brafferton with a very steep hipped roof and four rooms on each floor. The Brafferton may have been the first Virginia house with a central passage-plan. While Virginia gentry homes would emulate the Williamsburg Governor's Palace in terms of scale, their designs would to come to follow that of the Brafferton.

The "Wren-ish" restored Wren Chapel, credited to Thomas Tileston Waterman, includes a mid 18th-century English chamber organ loaned from the Colonial Williamsburg Foundation. The organ has been used in concerts since its installation in 1970 on the chapel's balcony. An altar cross was donated by Bruton Parish shortly after the restoration of the Wren Building. The Wren Cross became the subject of a culture war in 2006 after the college administration removed it from the altar "to make the Wren Chapel less of a faith-specific space". The Wren Cross is now normally held in a display case within the chapel, with individuals permitted to place it on the altar upon request. The restored Wren Chapel has been used for worship by the Catholic, Eastern Orthodox, and Episcopalian student ministries.

A "scarred" 1772 statue of Virginia governor Norborne Berkeley, 4th Baron Botetourt (also known as Lord Botetourt) by Richard Hayward that had stood in front of the Capitol was purchased by a group of William & Mary professors for $100 in 1801. It was installed in the College Yard, in front of the College Building. The statue's plinth was one of the earliest major pieces of Neoclassicism in British America. The statue survived the 1863 skirmish on the campus but was moved to Eastern State Hospital in 1864 to preserve it from harm. It was returned to campus in 1874. It was moved to storage in 1958 due to damage. It was placed on display in Swem Library in 1966. A bronze replica by college alumnus Gordon Kray was installed on the site of the original during the college's tercentenary celebrations in 1993. It is a school tradition to adorn the outdoor replica for the holiday season. (Note: Lord Botetourt was a popular governor and known for his affinity for the college. He often joined students for Morning Prayer in the Wren Chapel. Upon his death in 1770, Lord Botetourt was entombed in the chapel.)

The challenging to cross intersection where Jamestown Road, Richmond Road, Duke of Gloucester Street (also called DoG Street), and North and South Boundary Streets all meet is referred to as College Corner or Confusion Corner. DoG Street is now a pedestrian pathway that connects campus with Colonial Williamsburg (colloquially known as CW), dining, and shops. (Note: Confusion Corner was historically a name for the intersection on the east end of Duke Of Gloucester Street but that corner was rendered no longer confusing by a redesign; the campus terminus of the street began being referred to as Confusion Corner in the 1990s. During the 1950s—1960s, the campus intersection was called "Jockey Corner or Jockey's Corner" for the athletes who used to sit there.)

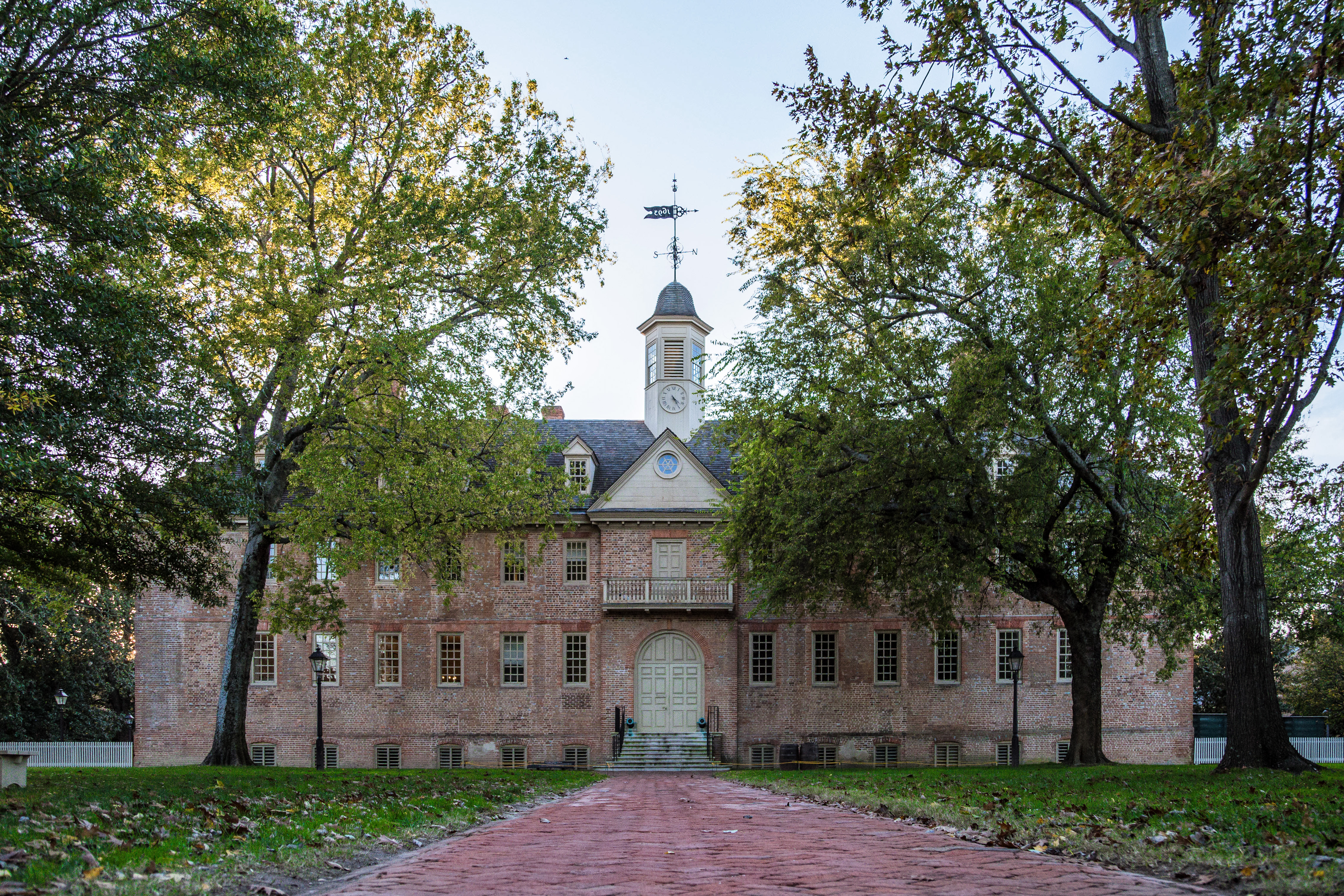
Wren Building

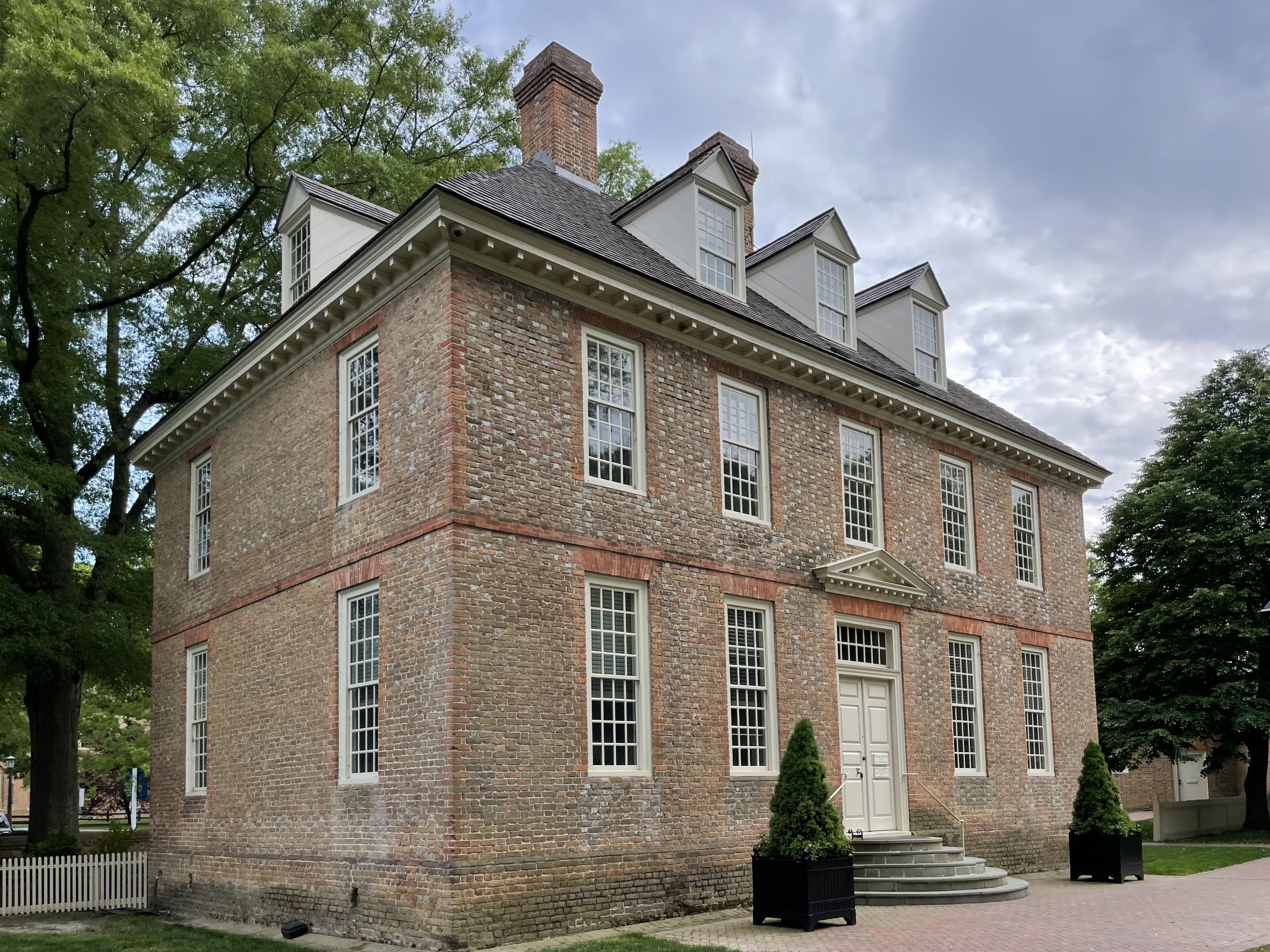
Brafferton

President's House

=== Old Campus ===
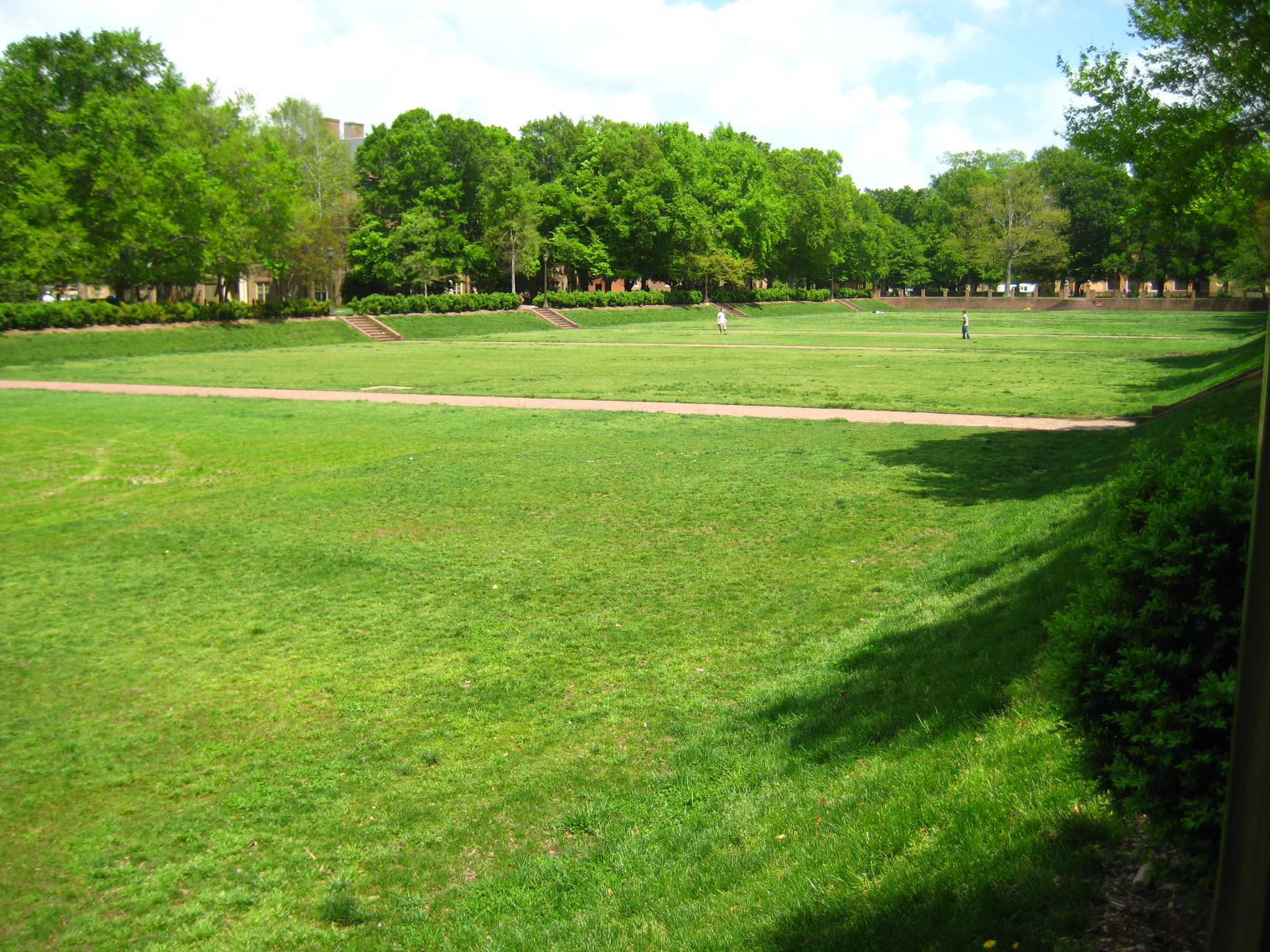
View of the Sunken Garden from its southwest corner, 2008

To the west of the Old College Yard, Old Campus was largely the work of architect Charles M. Robinson. Jefferson Hall, along Jamestown Road and designed by Robinson's firm, was the college's first purpose-built women's dorm. Monroe Hall was constructed as a men's dorm along Richmond Road during the same period. Robinson's Sunken Garden was built as a focal point for the academic halls and dorms around it. The Colonial Revival academic buildings designed by Robinson included Washington, Chancellors, and Blair Halls. Each are "tall, strait-laced, H-shaped" structures. Robinson and his junior partner John Binford Walford designed the dormitories Barrett, Chandler, Brown, Landrum, and Old Dominion Halls, which were built c. 1926–1930. These dorms were typified by central pavilions, entrances close to ground-level, and connecting arcades Robinson dubbed "cloisters". James Blair (originally Marshall-Wythe) Hall housed the law school from 1935 until 1968. Chancellors Hall (built in 1927 for science classes) was originally named Rogers Hall, renamed to Chancellors Hall, then Tyler Hall, then back to Chancellors Hall.

Brick walls clearly mark Old Campus's boundaries, with passages for pedestrian and vehicle traffic. Gate piers depicting William III and Mary II by sculptor Emil Siebern were intended for installation on College Corner, mirroring Ivy League entrances. This plan fell afoul of restoration plans and they were ultimately installed on Old Campus in 1932. A nine-foot bronze statue of James Blair in clerical robes by Lewis Cohen was installed between Blair Hall and Chancellors Hall in 1993. Students have referred to this statue as Darth Vader. A statue of a student-aged Jefferson is located opposite. West of Blair Hall is the Tyler Garden, which features an echo wall.

After Walford took over as campus architect, he designed the Colonial Revival Bryan dorm complex and Cary Stadium (now known as Zable Stadium). The Bryan Complex was constructed on the site of the first Cary Field, a dual baseball diamond/football field. McGlothin-Street (formerly Tercentenary) Hall was built along the Sunken Garden in 1993–1995 on designs by partially by Allan Greenberg. It has been appraised as a "Hawksmoorian shell that houses an interior reminiscent of a budget motel". Across from Old Campus on Richmond Road are five brick houses designed by Robinson and Walford and built 1929–1931. Together known as Sorority Court, they face an oval courtyard ringed by similarly designed homes along the streets.

St. George Tucker Hall (built 1908–1909), was designed like an 18th-century Virginia courthouse. Renovated and expanded by Robinson, it formerly served as the college's library and presently houses the English department. A bronze statue by Gordon Kay of U.S. president and college alumnus James Monroe was installed in front of Tucker Hall in 2015. The statue's granite base features bronze reliefs. Hearth: Memorial to the Enslaved was designed by alumnus Will Sendor and dedicated next to Old Campus in 2022, commemorating those enslaved at the college. The memorial, which was announced by the college's Lemon Project and includes the names of those known kept as slaves by the college, emulates a fireplace. The memorial's Hearth Memorial Vessel was dedicated in 2023.

Between Old Campus and New Campus is a body of water known as Crim Dell. It is spanned by the Chinese-style wooden Crim Dell bridge, built in during a 1964–1966 landscaping project around the pond. Student lore maintains that crossing the bridge with a partner means one is "destined to be together [with them] forever"; crossing alone leaves one "fated to spend the rest of [their] life in solitude". (Note: Another version of this tradition states that kissing someone on the Crim Dell bridge secures perpetual connection.) The site was once named as among the most romantic college locations by Playboy. Seniors cross the bridge as part of the graduation ceremonies. A campus stormwater pond, called the "Grim Dell" for its "dismal appearance", received a floating artificial wetland in 2012. The "mattress" was developed on-campus to remove excess nitrogen from the water. Another wetland mattress was placed in Crim Dell in 2013.

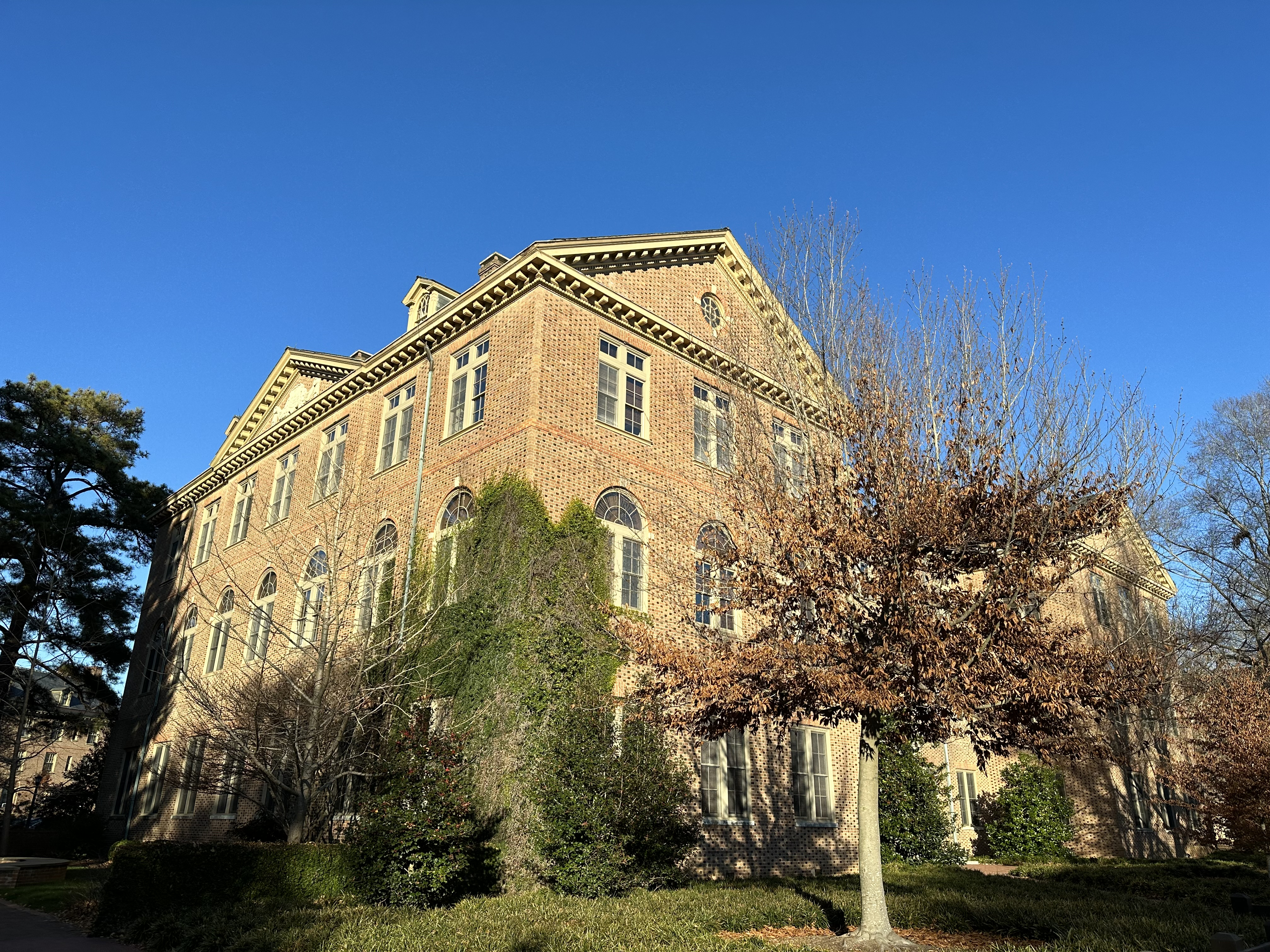
Blair Hall

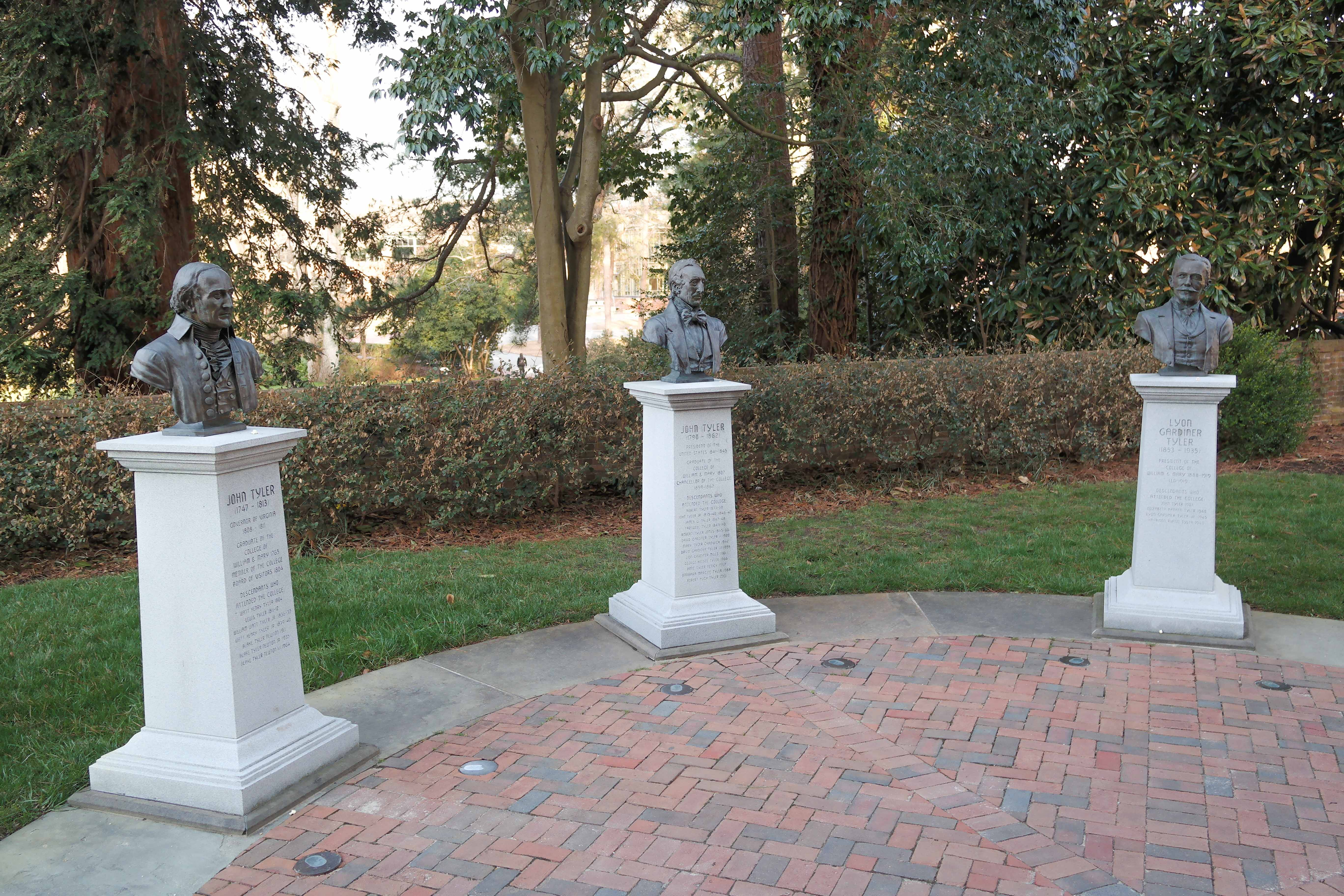
The Tyler Garden, dedicated to members of the Tyler family

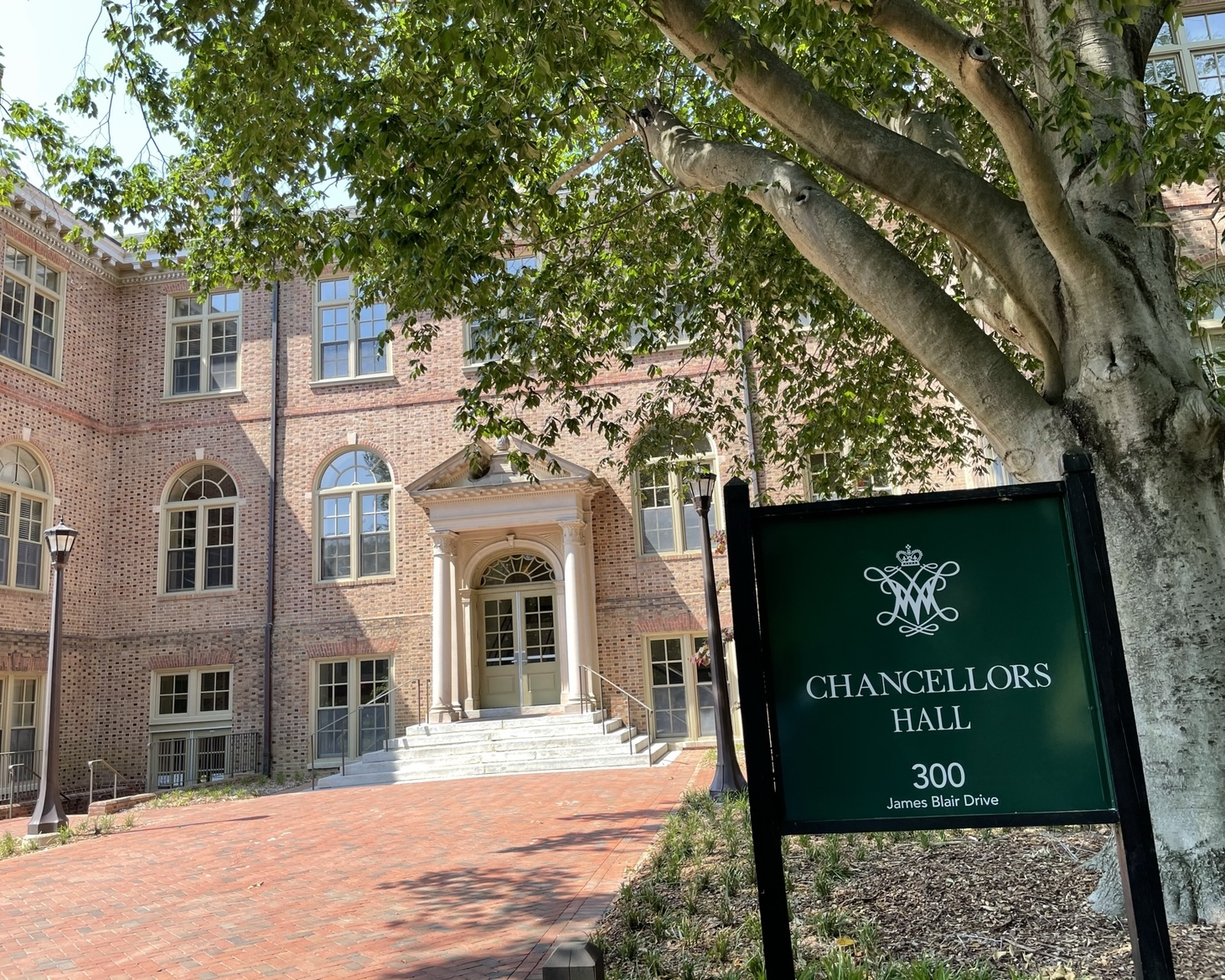
Chancellors Hall

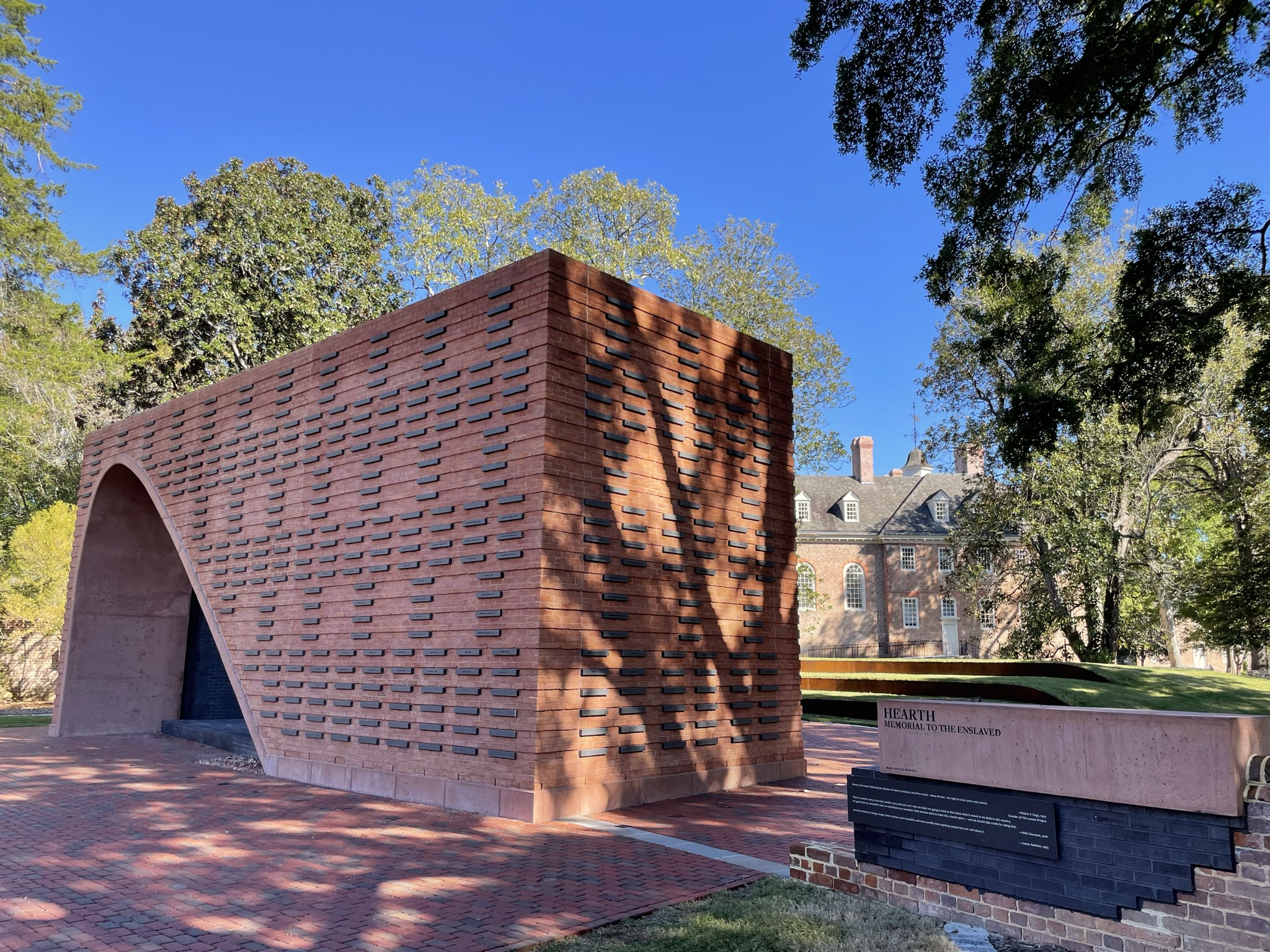
Hearth: Memorial to the Enslaved

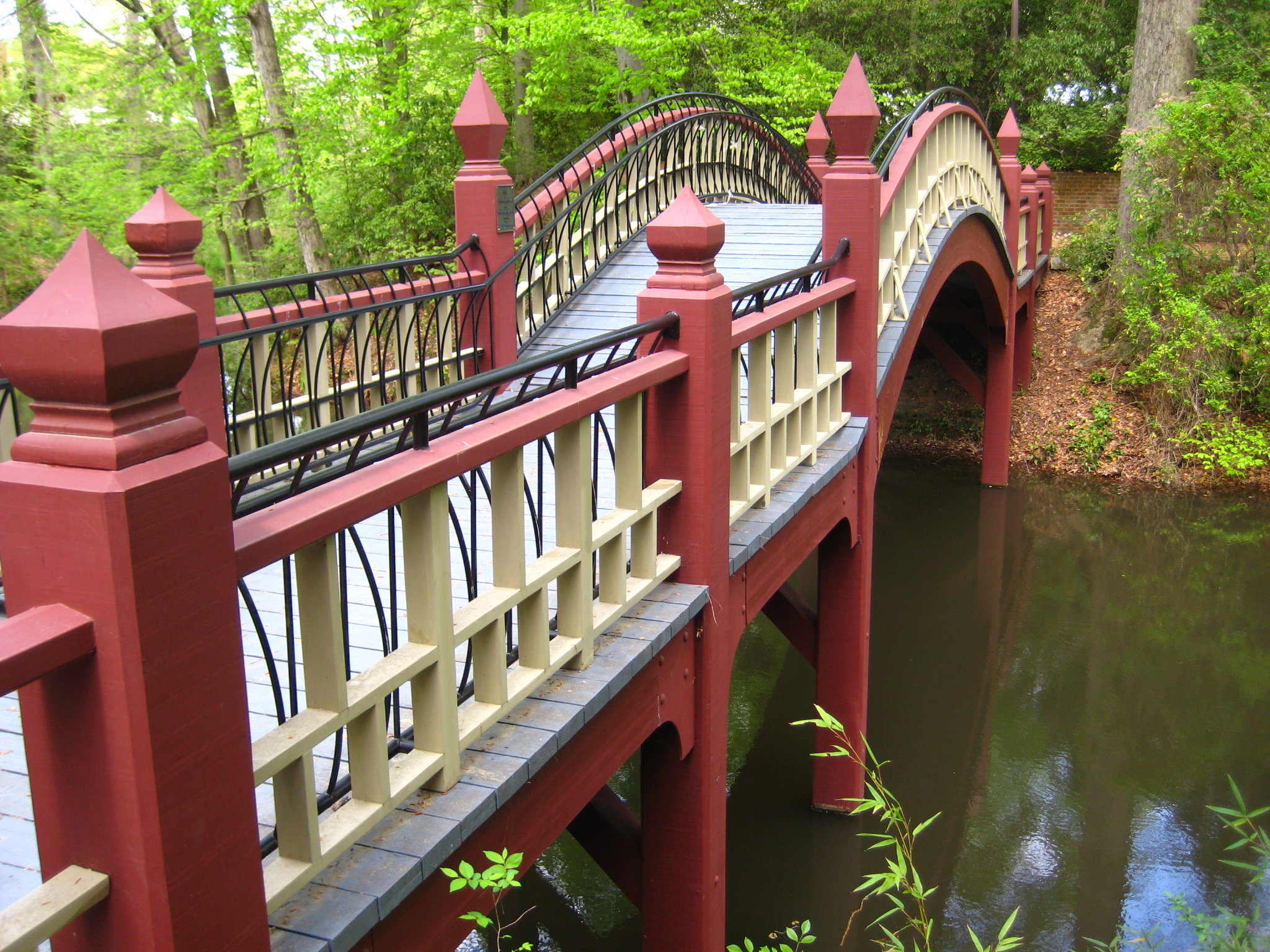
Crim Dell bridge

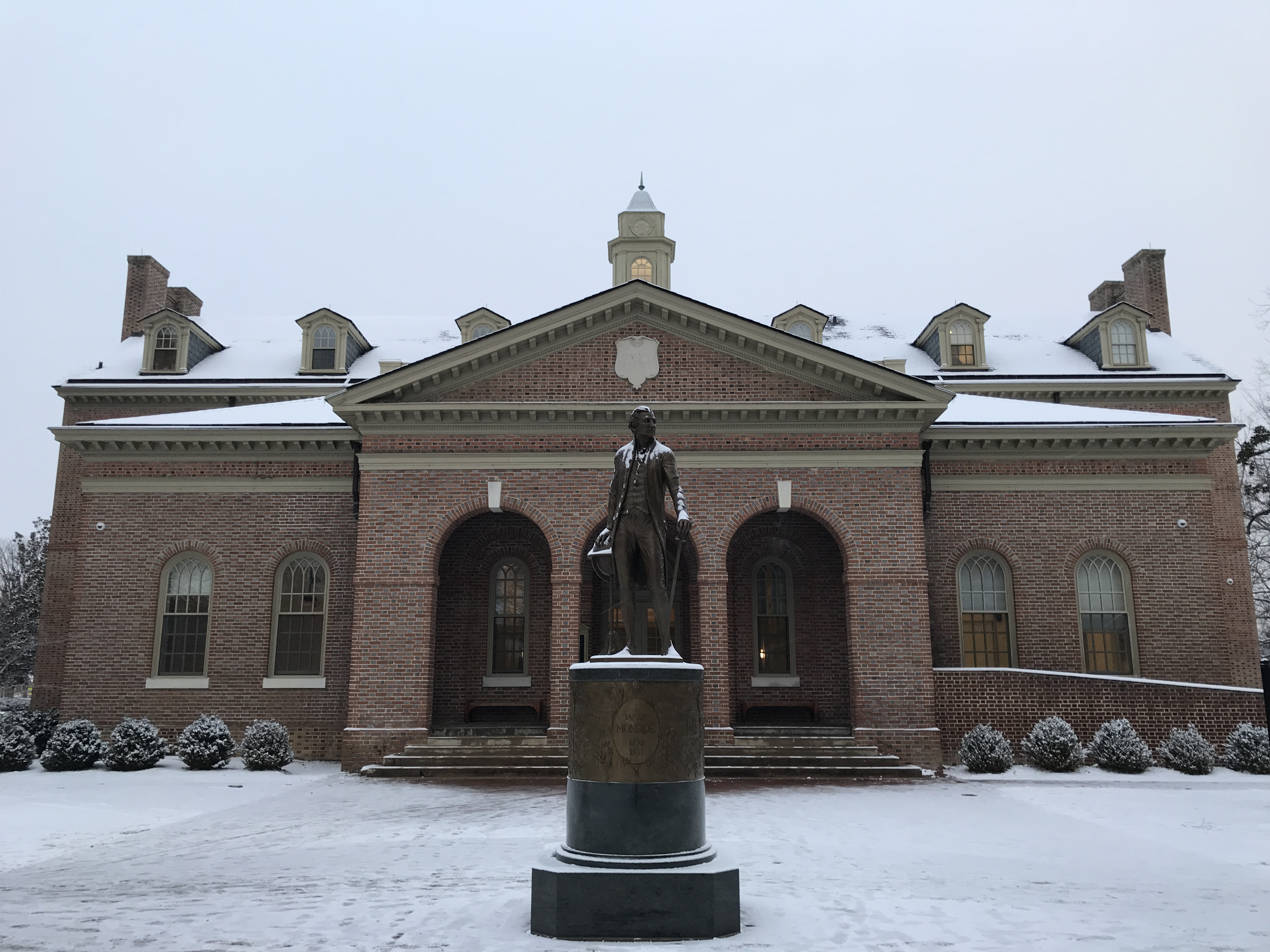
Tucker Hall and Monroe statue

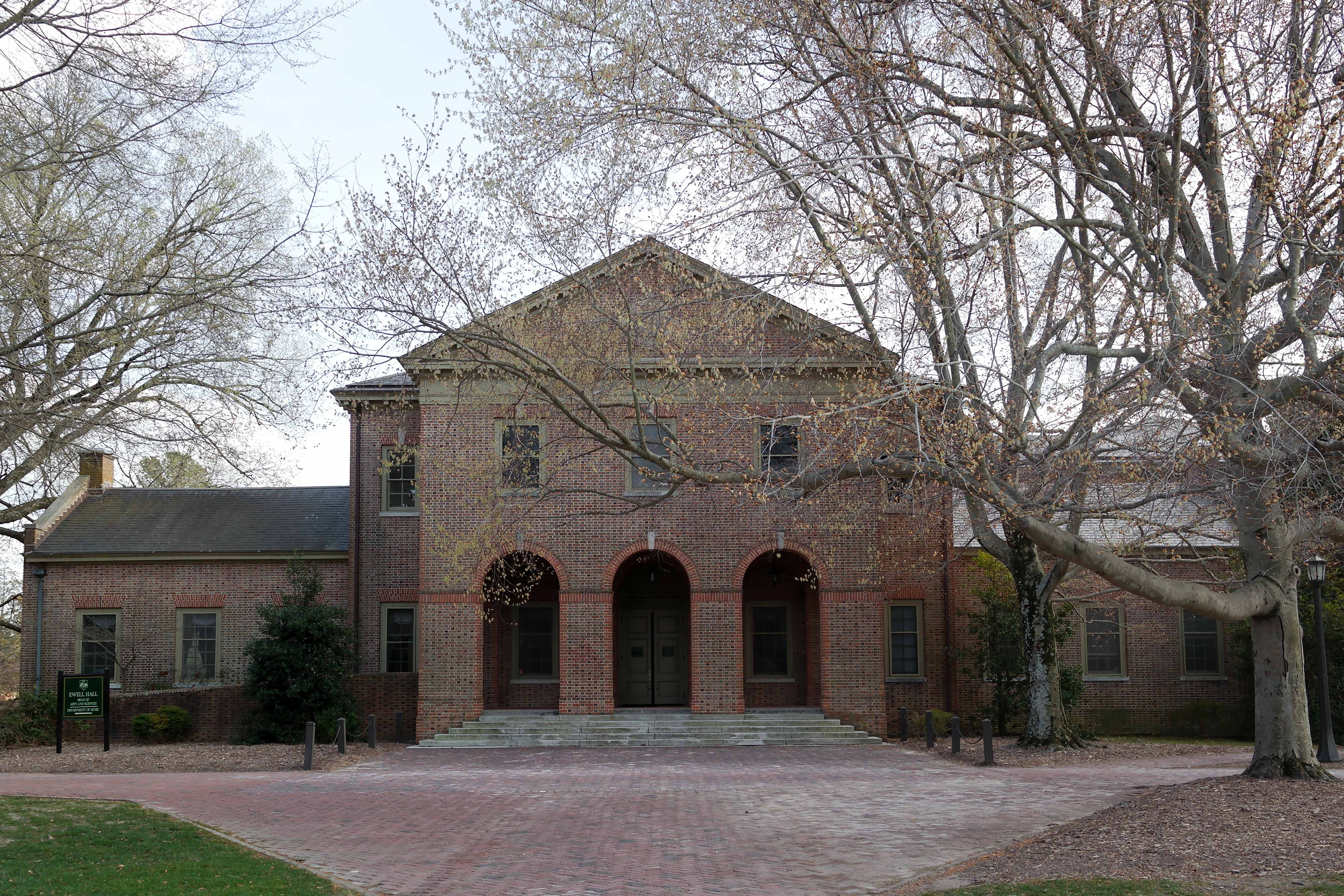
Ewell Hall

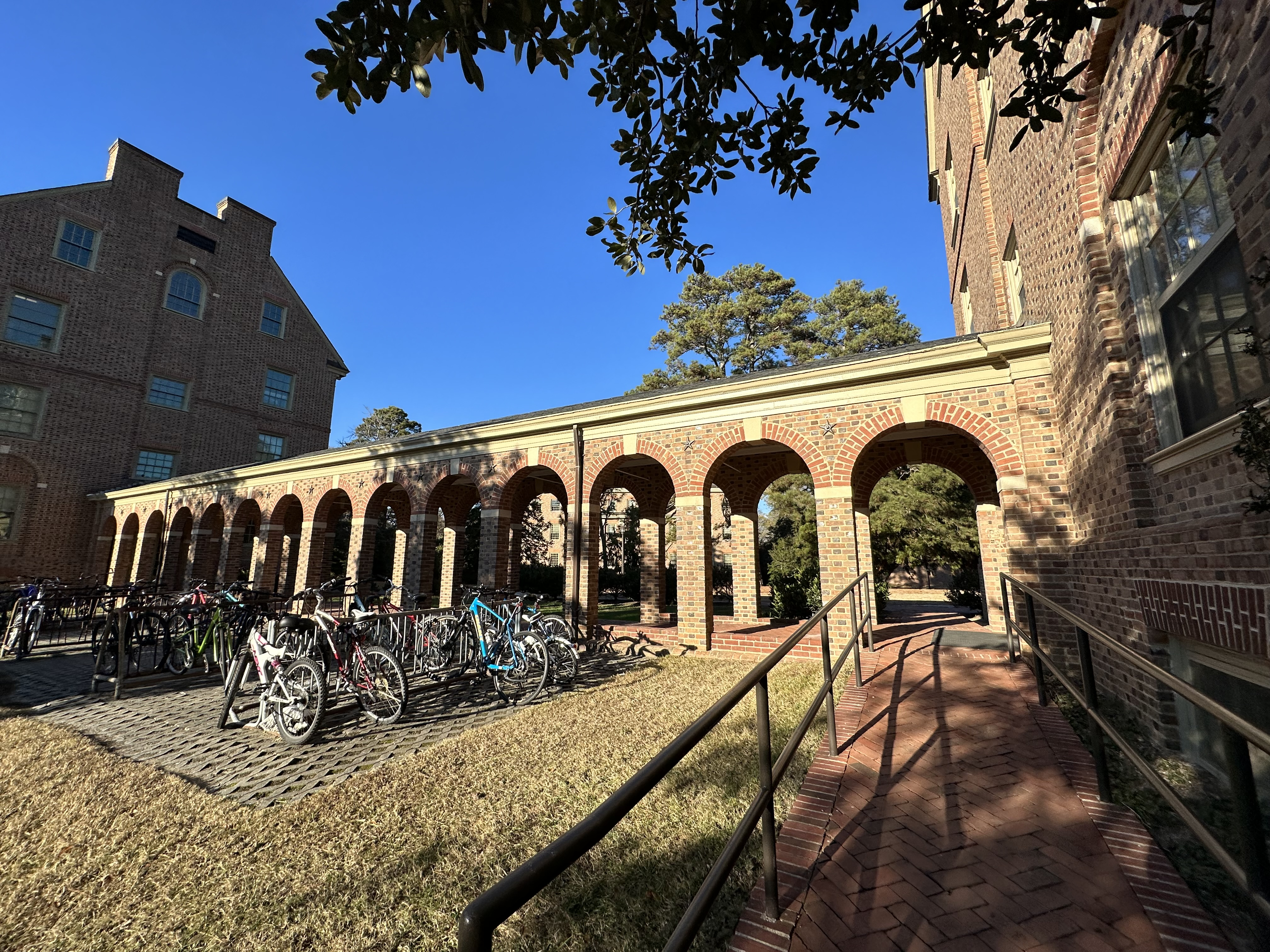
Cloister between Barrett and Landrum Halls

=== New Campus ===
The 1956 Phi Beta Kappa (PBK) Memorial Hall was the first building constructed as part of New Campus. It was demolished and renovated between 2019 and 2023, when it reopened as part of the new Fine and Performing Arts Complex. Andrews Hall was built as an addition to PBK Hall. It faces Earl Gregg Swem Library across a square. Additional classroom buildings were built in the 1960s and 1970s without the same organized orientation.

Swem Library's modern upper exterior was designed to evoke book stacks. A portion of the library façade was replaced with a postmodern design in 1986. The library houses the college's special collections, spanning subject areas such as the university, Williamsburg, U.S. history, and the environment. Swem Library also contains the Center for Geospatial Analysis, a geographic information system mapping department. The Omohundro Institute of Early American History and Culture, which publishes the William and Mary Quarterly, is located in the Swem Library's basement.

Small Hall (built 1962–1963, opened 1964) is named for William Small. An astronomical observatory with a 10-inch telescope was installed on Small Hall's roof in 1975; William & Mary may have been the home to the first permanent observatory in the United States (built 1778). Small Hall received a two-story addition in 1985 and a high-field NMR magnet, then the largest in the state, was added in 2005. Boswell (named for John Boswell, formerly named for Richard Lee Morton) Hall was dedicated in 1973 and has housed a variety of academic departments. "A tall building in a ditch", the hall's design has drawn comparisons to prison architecture. The small, brown brick Muscarelle Museum of Art, designed by Carlton Abbott and built 1982–1983, utilizes sharp angles similar to the National Gallery of Art's 1976 East Building designed by I. M. Pei. Abbott also designed the 1986–1987 enlargement. The Muscarelle Museum, the first campus building solely with private funds, features a colorful solar wall designed by Gene B. Davis.

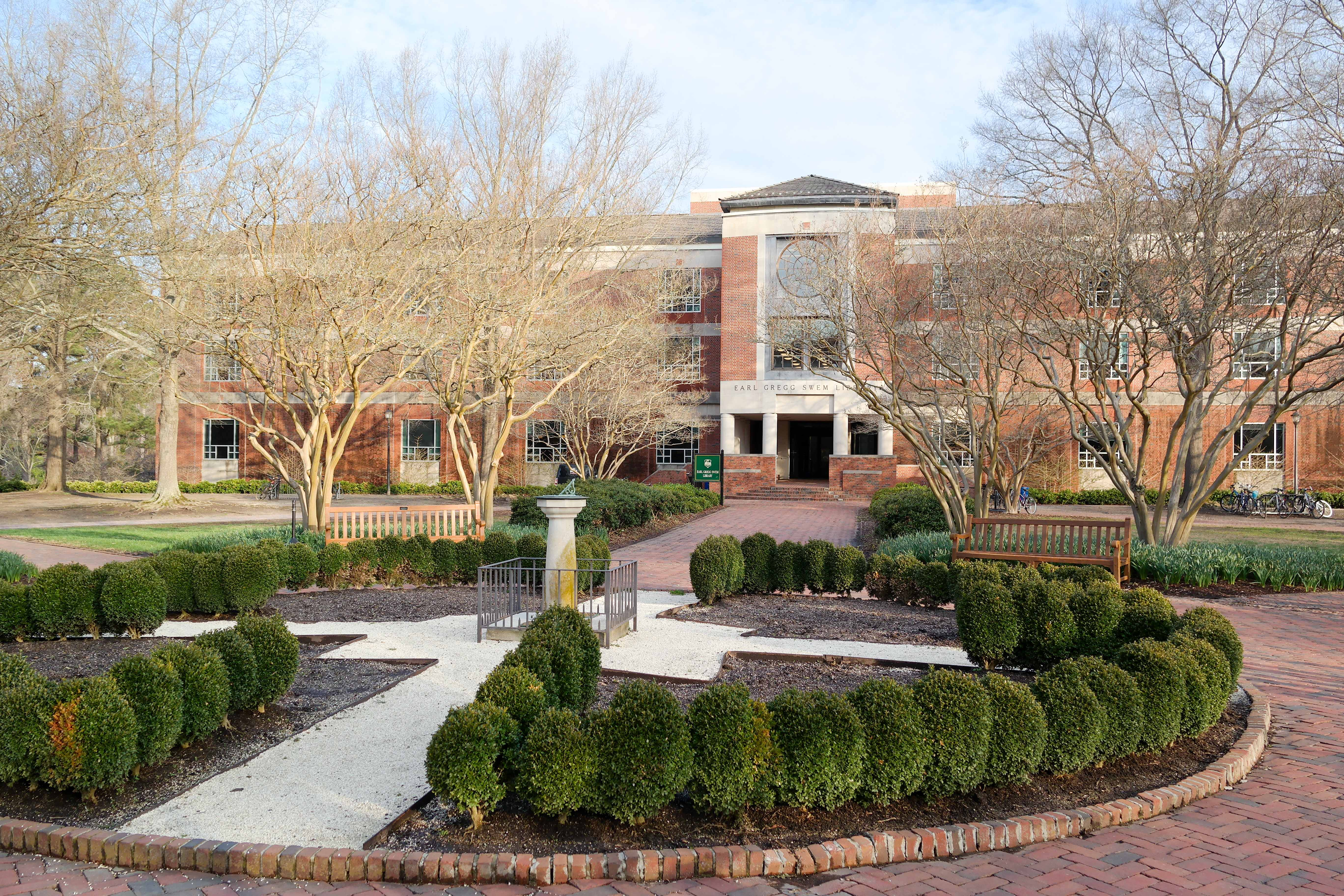
Swem Library

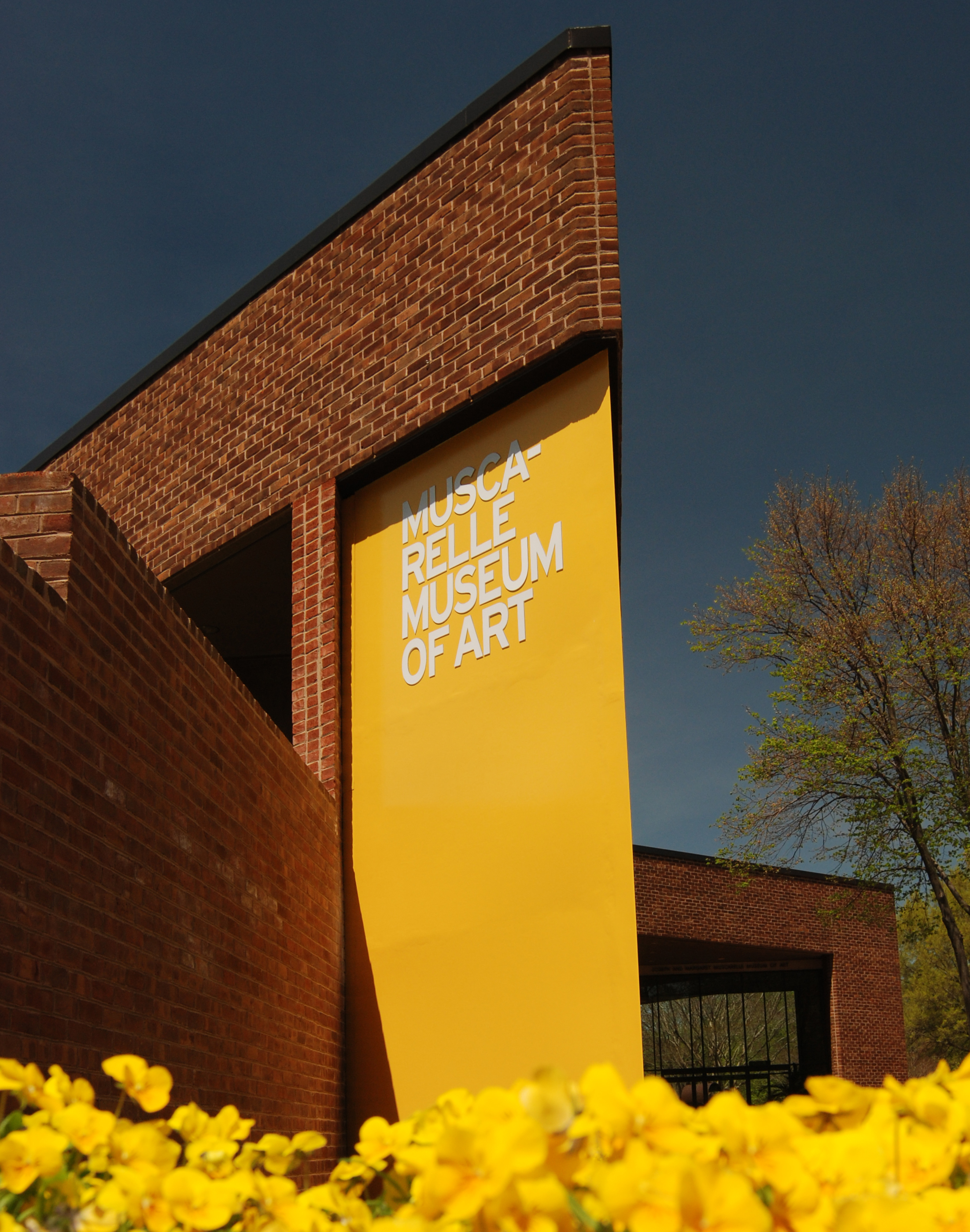
Muscarelle Museum

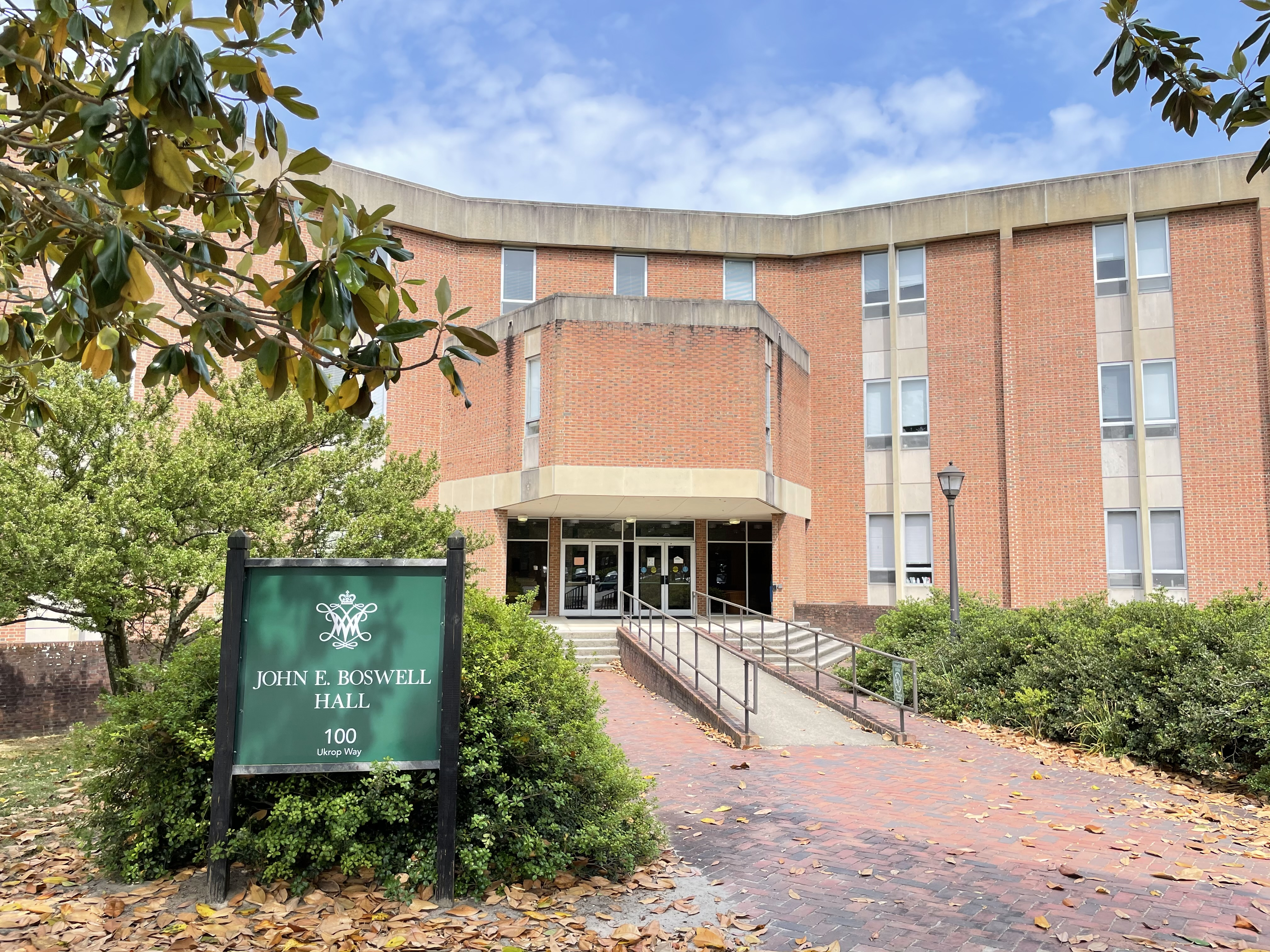
Boswell Hall

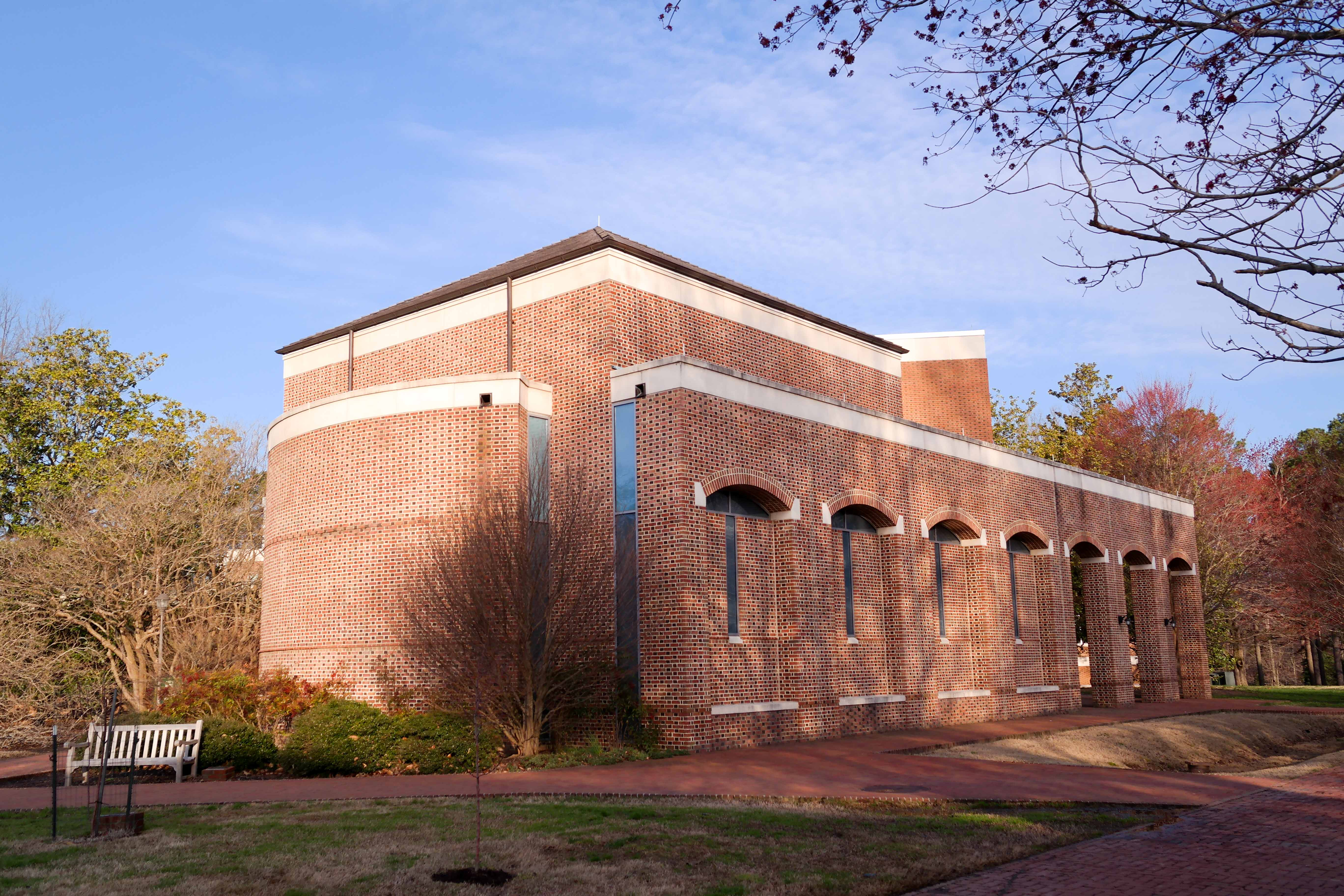
Small Hall

=== College Woods ===
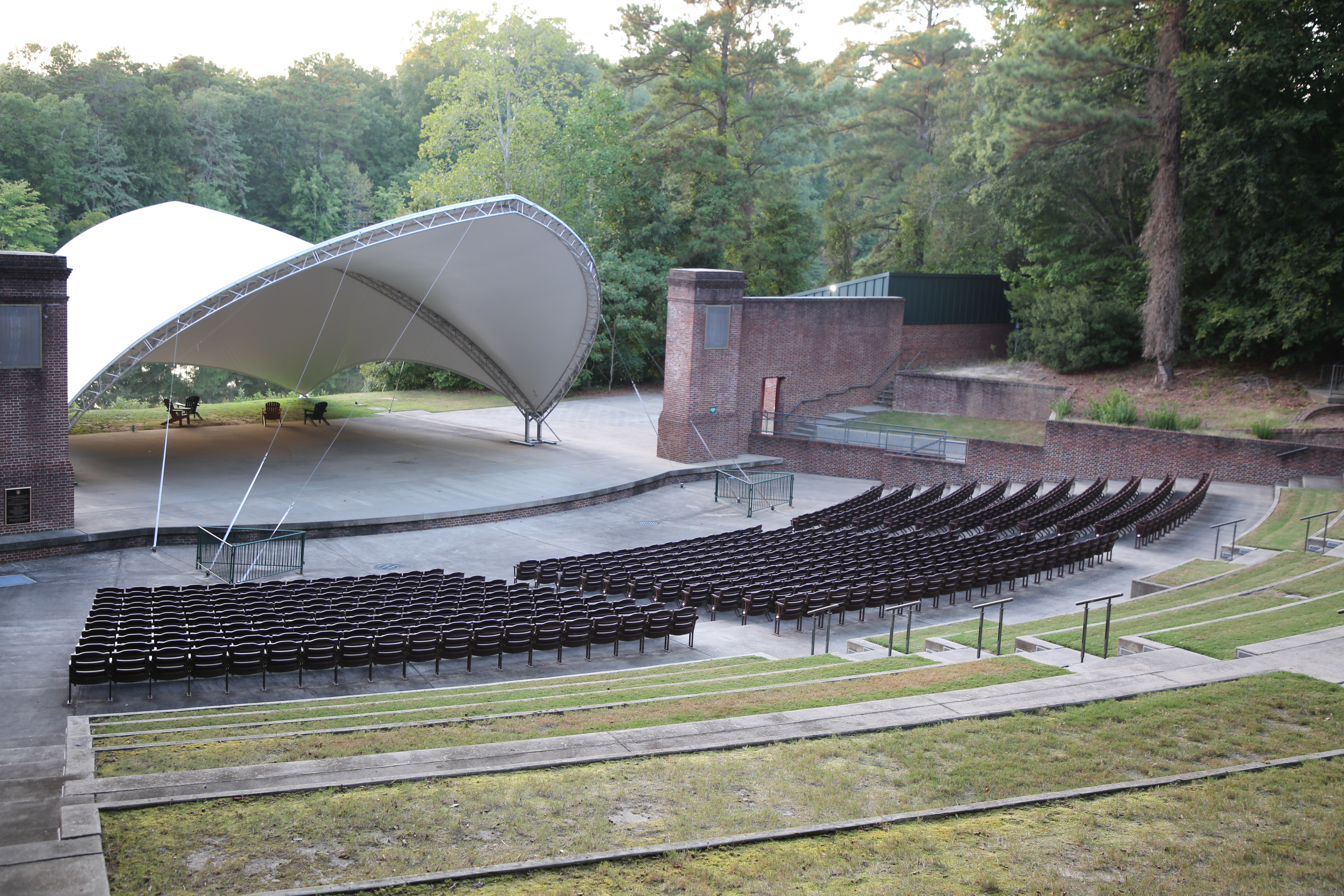
Martha Wren Briggs Amphitheater Amphitheater on the shore of Lake Matoaka, 2022

The College or Matoaka Woods includes forested property that had been Archer's Hope Swamp, which was sold off by the college in the first half of the 18th century. The portion of College Creek flowing through the area was dammed as a mill pond shortly after private acquisition. In the 1920s, the college repurchased 1,200 acres of the College Woods and pond. The pond was soon named Lake Matoaka for a Powhatan name of Pocahontas. The Civilian Conservation Corps would construct many new structures and trails around Lake Matoaka in 1933–1934, with the area designated as Matoaka Park. (Note: Two brick buildings built for the CCC are preserved adjacent to the former site of Yates Hall. The buildings are used by the college's facility management.)

Portions of the College Woods were developed in the 1950s and 1960s as part of construction of New Campus and to remove losses caused by a beetle infestation. An amphitheater was built along Lake Matoaka in 1947 by the Jamestown Corporation for showings of The Common Glory, a historical outdoor drama. A second amphitheater, known as the Cove Amphitheater, was constructed by the Jamestown Corporation along Lake Matoaka in 1956 for showings of The Founders, a less successful show which ran for two seasons. Both amphitheaters were donated to the college in 1976. The first amphitheater was renovated by the college in 2006 and renamed as the Martha Wren Briggs Amphitheater. The Cove Amphitheater's dressing building was used by the college as an art studio while the amphitheater itself was reclaimed by nature.

George W. Grayson, a government professor at the college and a member of the Virginia House of Delegates, was among those who opposed a 1994 proposal by state officials to sell the College Woods and Lake Matoaka. The state had determined that the college had left the College Woods without an official designated use; then-William & Mary president Timothy J. Sullivan stated that the woods and Lake Matoaka were used "extensively for classes in biology, geology, kinesiology and military science". To prevent further loss of the College Woods following the development of Route 199 and Monticello Avenue to the campus's west, the college purchased neighboring properties and designated 300 acres of the woods as a natural preserve in the 1990s.

=== South Campus ===
The South Campus is located roughly half a mile from the main campus. The satellite campus, located about half a mile from the main campus, is home to the William & Mary Law School. The law school's original building on the South Campus (built 1978–1979) was informed by the same colonial influences as those present elsewhere at the college. Following a needed renovation, the law school library reopened as the Henry C. Wolf Law Library in 2007. The library reached its 400,000th volume in 2008 (up from 100,000 in 1975). The 2007 facility contains 568 seats, a dozen group study rooms, and two computer labs. The Lettie Pate Whitehead Evans Graduate Student Housing (built 1990–1992) borrows from 17th-century English urban housing patterns in a "very appealing" manner. The 1995-built McCormack-Nagelsen Tennis Center has been was described in the Virginia entry of the Buildings of the United States as "a hulking mass".

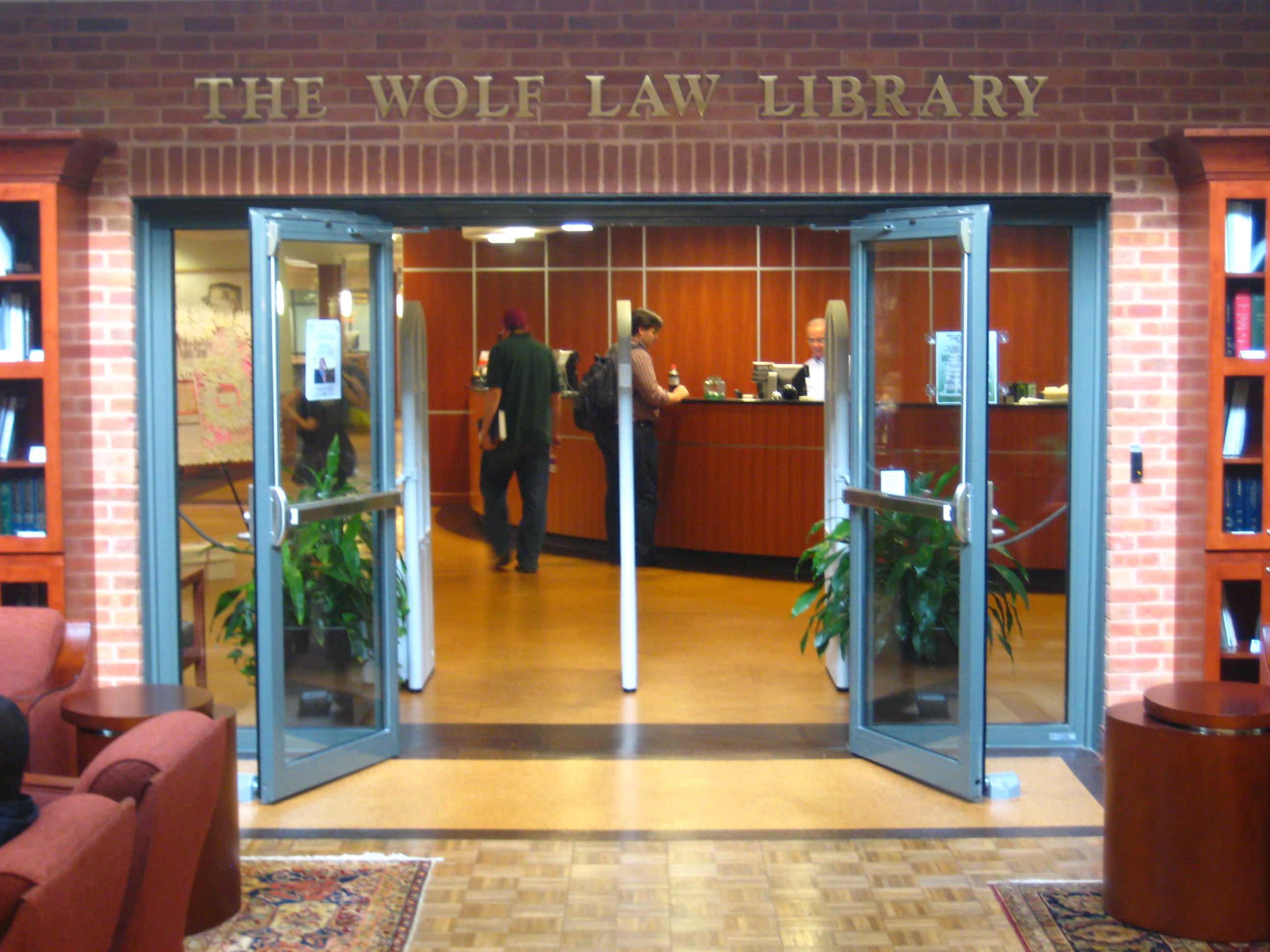
Wolf Law Library

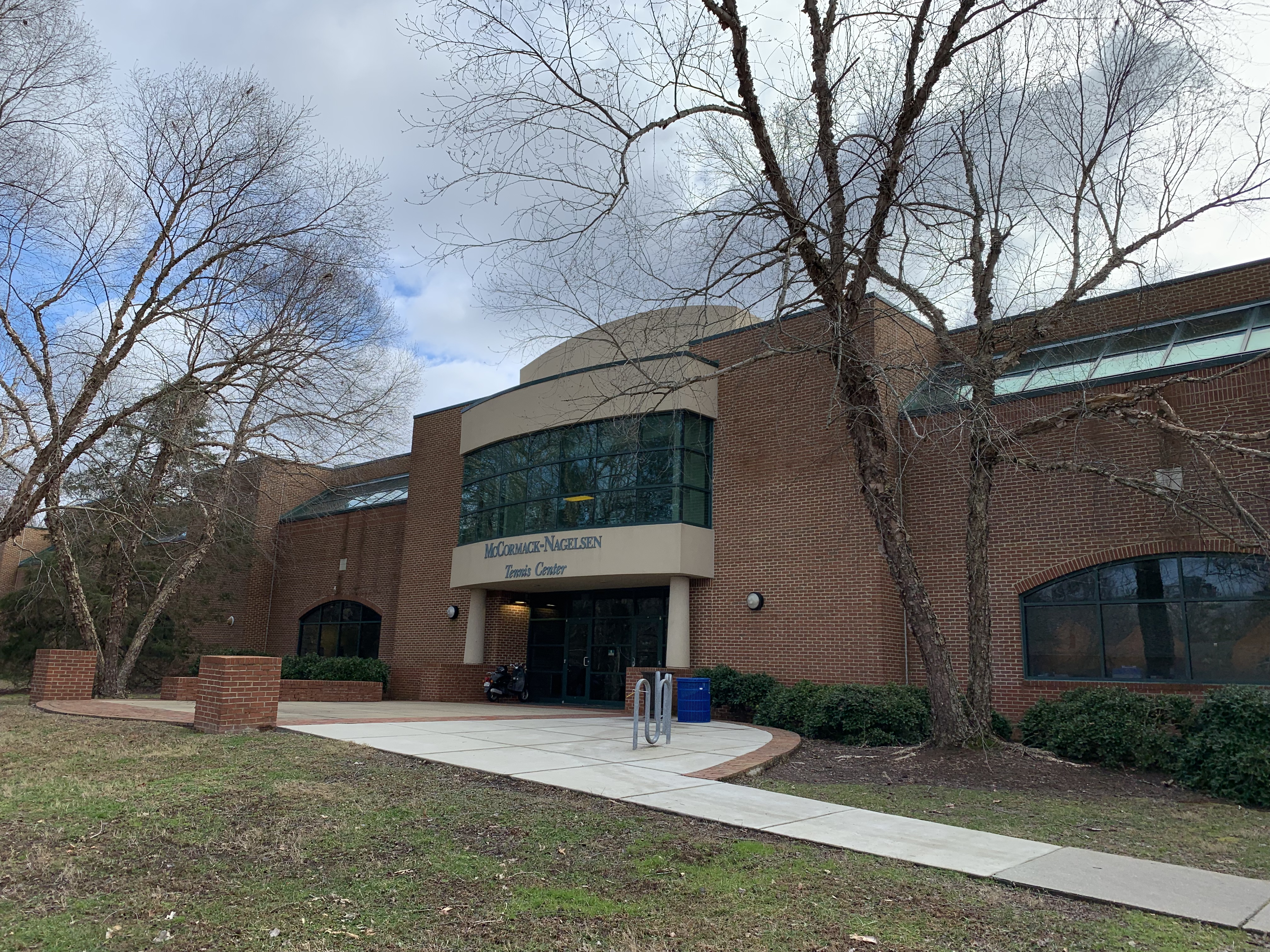
McCormack-Nagelsen Tennis Center

=== Dillard Complex ===
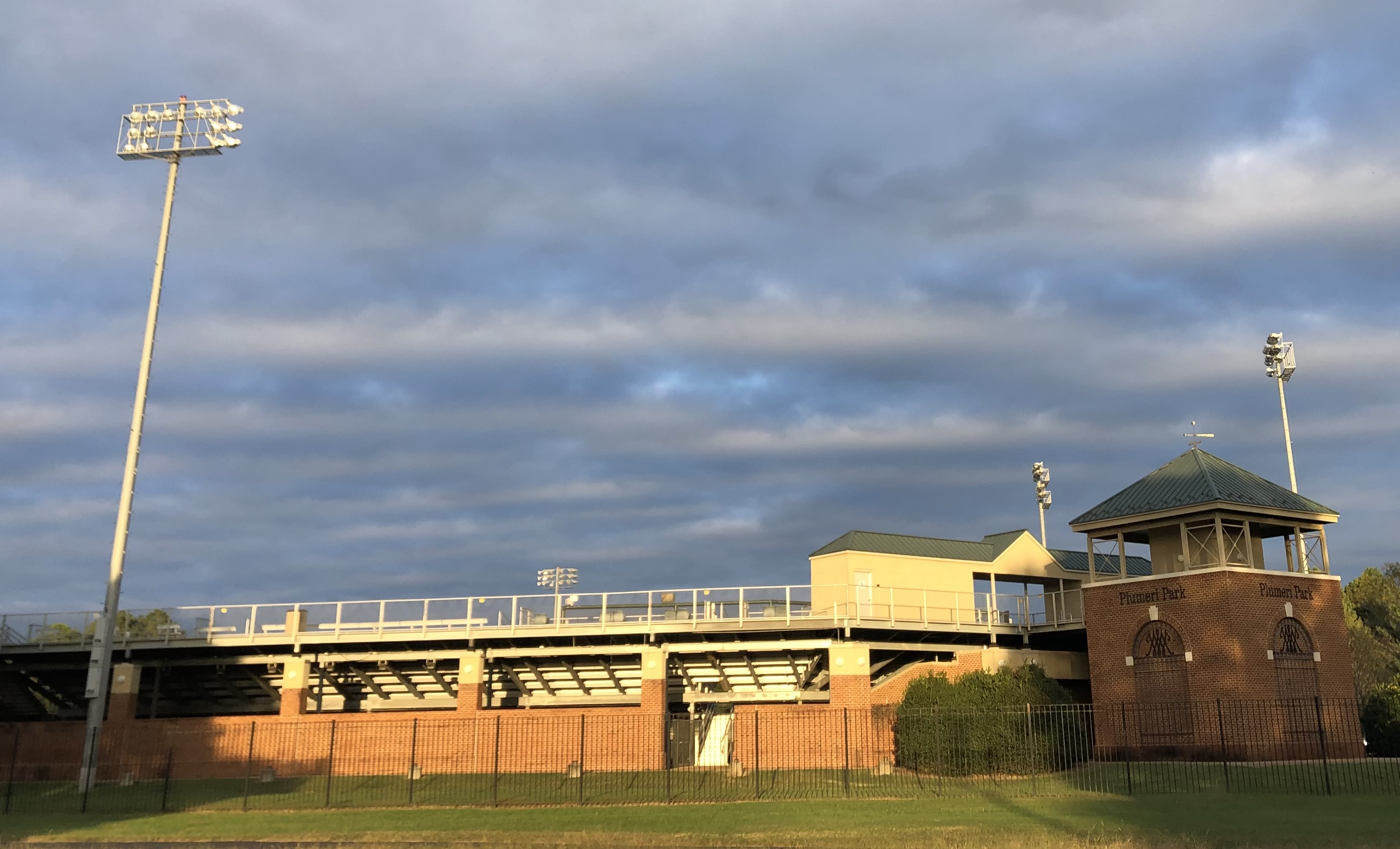
Plumeri Park

William & Mary leased two Eastern State Hospital buildings on Ironbound Road from 1965 until 1980, when the college acquired the buildings and 38 acres of property. Four additional buildings on the property, formerly physicians residences, were also acquired and renamed the Galt Houses. The two main buildings, renamed Hughes and Munford Halls, were renovated in 1980 to accommodate students as dorms, while the Galt Houses were home to graduate students. Hughes and Munford Halls were abandoned in 2006 after the Jamestown North and South dorms were opened. The 2015 campus master plan called for the buildings to be razed. Plumeri Park, opened in 1999, was built adjacent to the Dillard Complex for the college baseball team. The facility can seat 1,000 and features a scoreboard added before the 2005 season.

=== Transportation ===
The Williamsburg Area Transit Authority (WATA) was formed in 2006 after the Virginia General Assembly allowed the governments of James City County, Williamsburg, and York County to form a regional transit authority with William & Mary and the Colonial Williamsburg Foundation. WATA succeeded the Williamsburg Area Transport and 1977-established James City County Transit. WATA operates 12 routes, including the William & Mary Route 8 which does not run during the summer months. A contract between the college and WATA allows student, faculty, and staff to ride all WATA routes by presenting their William & Mary ID. The college formerly managed its own bus route, called the "Green Machine", through the 1990s.

Car parking on the Williamsburg campus is divided across several lots. The Zable Stadium lot is designated as exclusively faculty and staff parking. A parking deck is located along Ukrop Way. The college operates shuttle routes, including to the School of Education. It also operates a limited mobility shuttle as an accommodation to qualified students.

== Richard Bland College campus ==
The campus of Richard Bland College of William & Mary comprises 16 buildings on around 800 acres. East Campus is within Prince George County, while the West Campus is in Dinwiddie County. A science and humanities building was opened in 2015. The campus features a pecan grove; the local community and squirrel population have harvested from this crop.

The President's House on East Campus is one of two farmhouses that predates the college's 1960 establishment. In 1988, college president Clarence Maze Jr. launched the construction of an Asian Water Garden modeled on the Giverny gardens of Claude Monet. The gardens are visible from the President's House's entertaining room (added 2009). The Barn Theater also originally dates to the campus's previous use as a dairy farm.

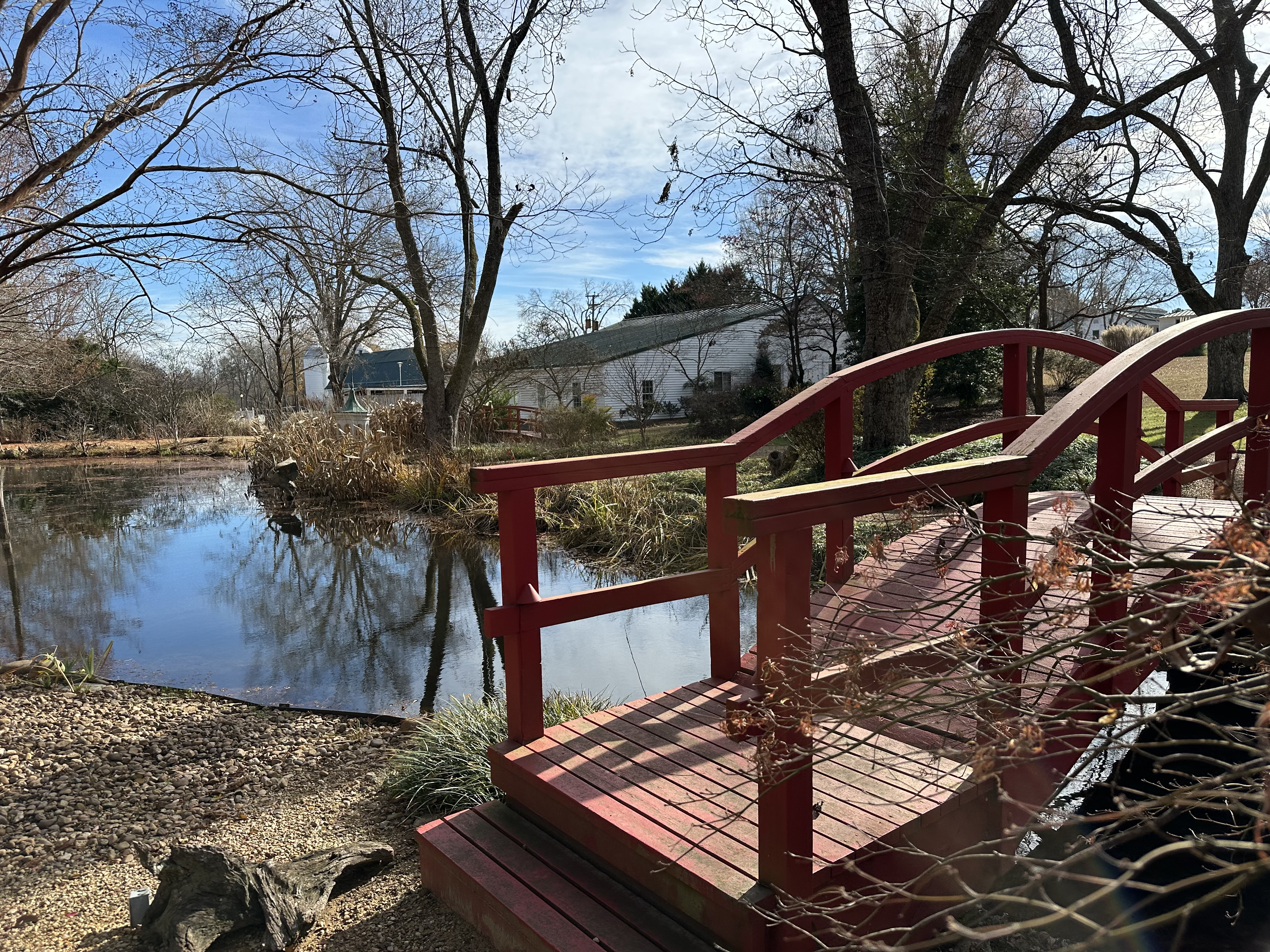
Asian Water Garden

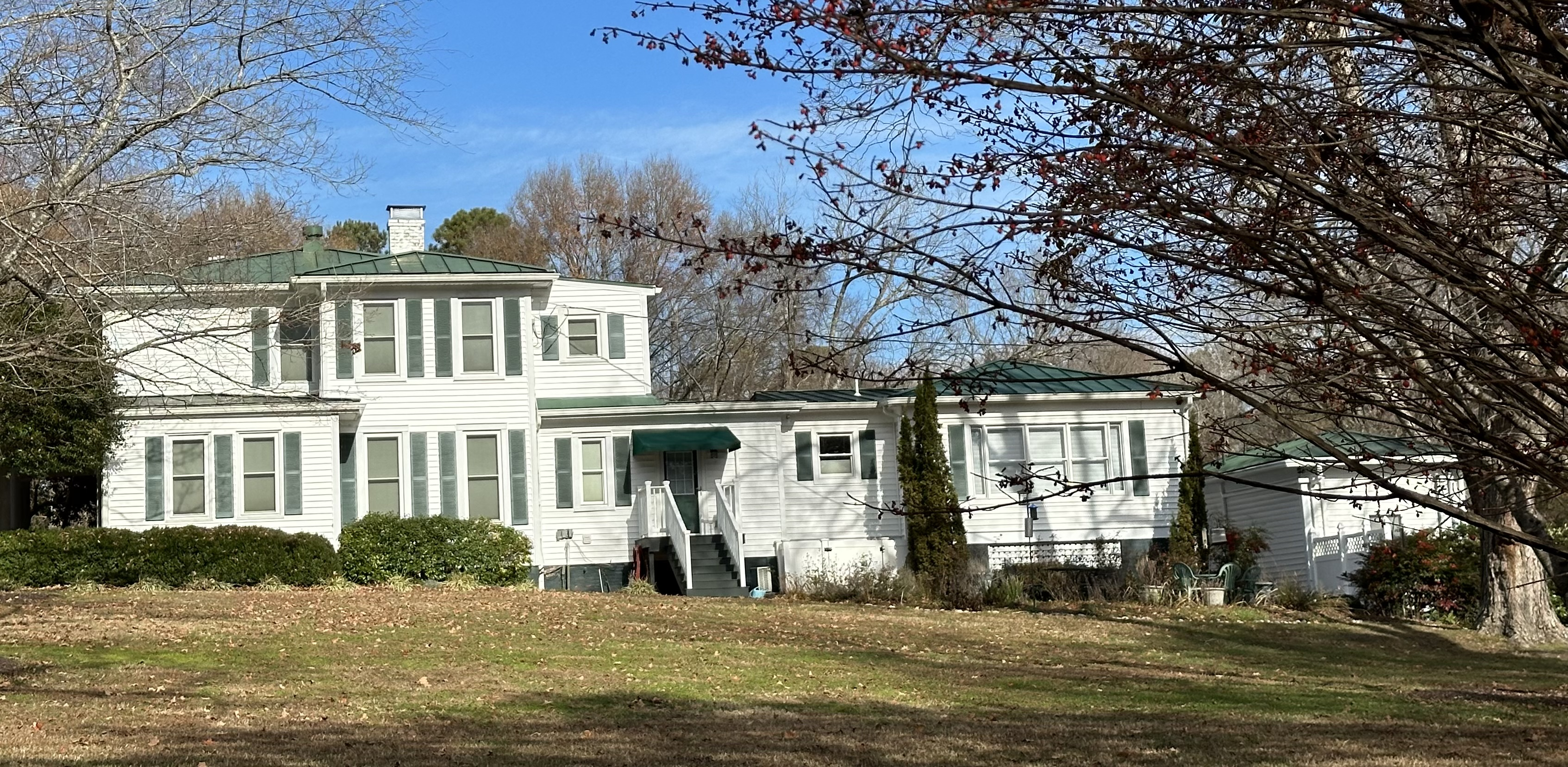
President's House

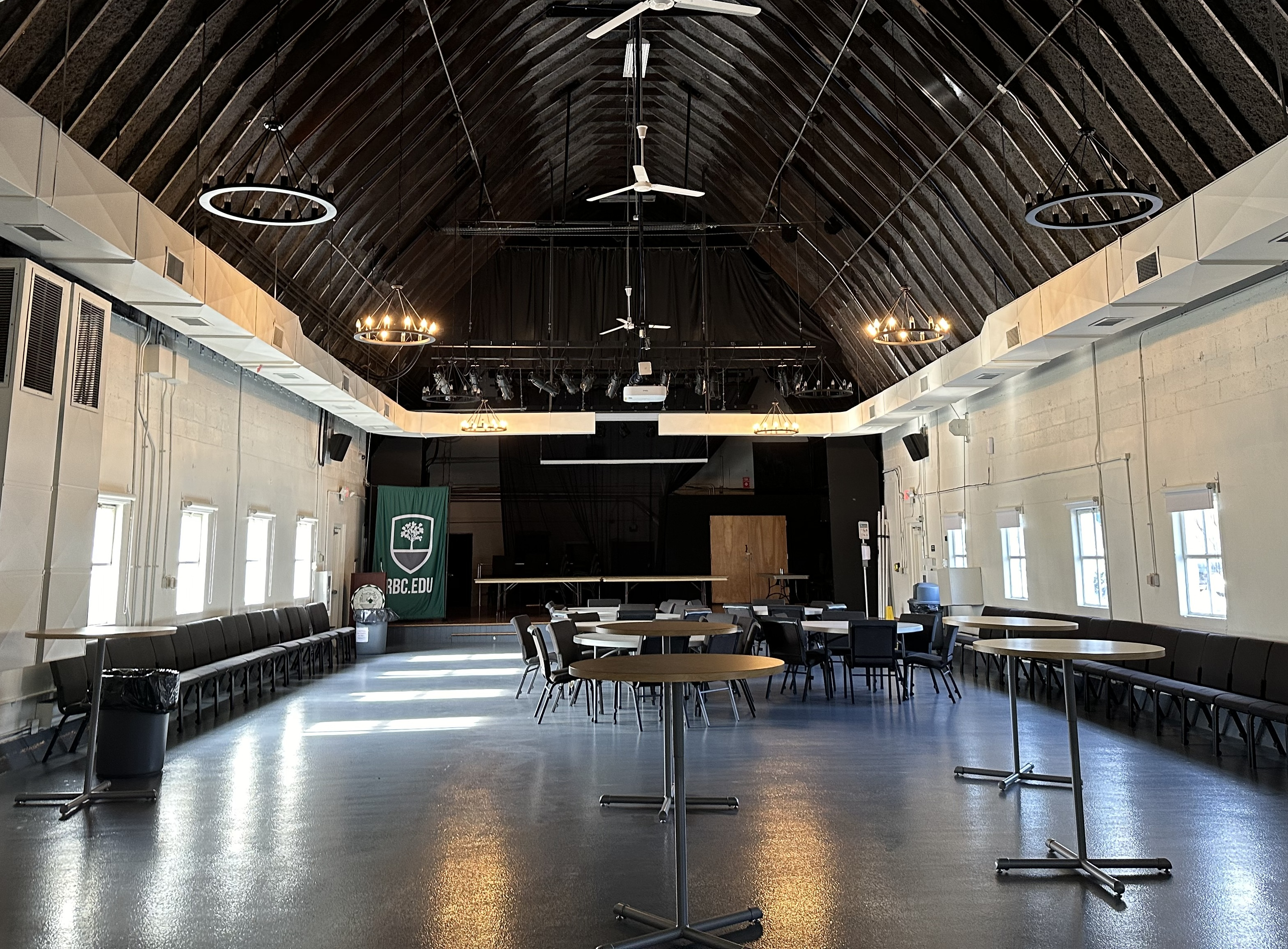
Barn Theater

== Virginia Institute of Marine Science campuses ==
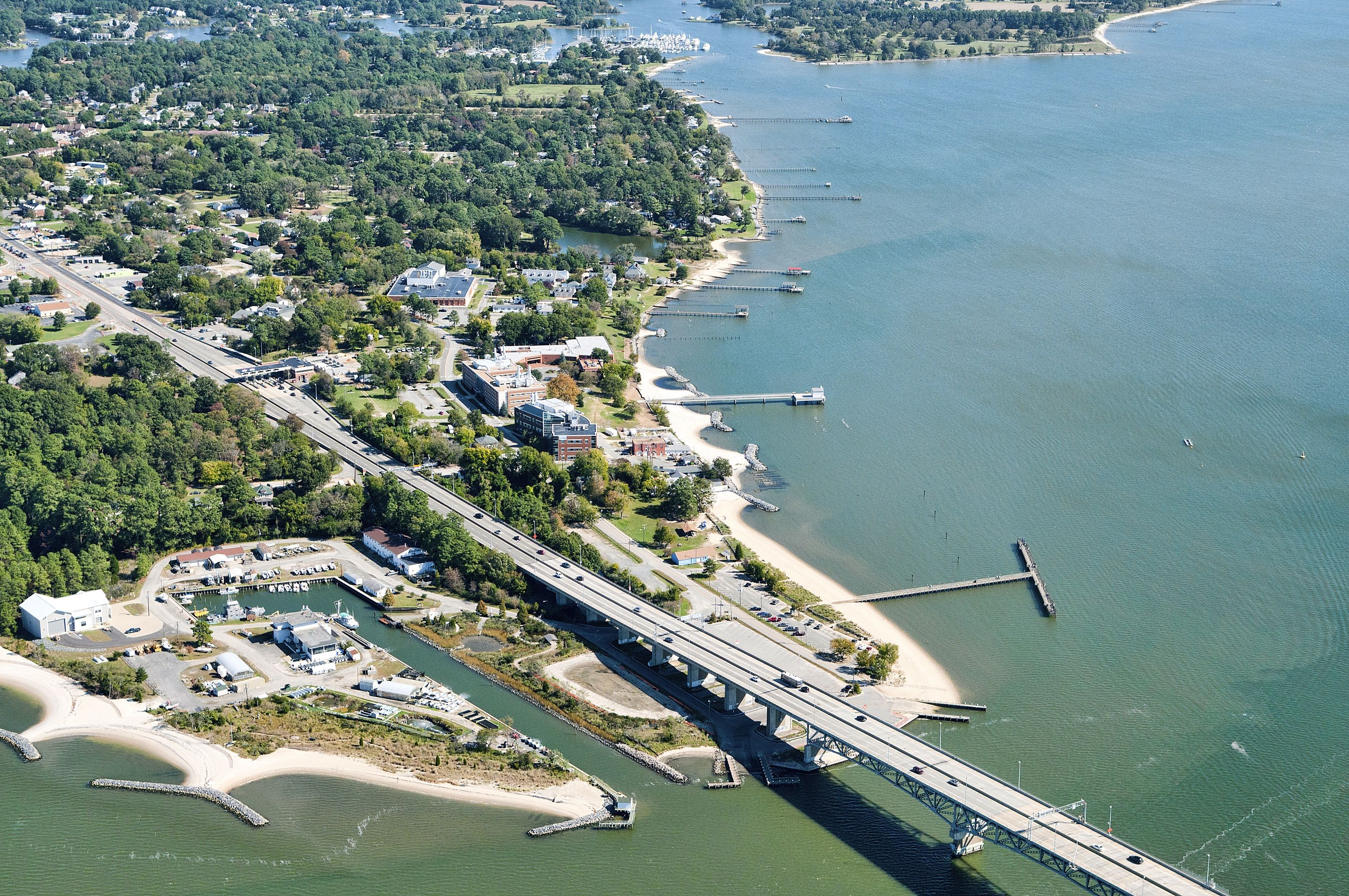
VIMS campus at Gloucester Point, 2010

The Virginia Institute of Marine Science's main campus is in Gloucester Point, 13 miles from the Williamsburg campus of William & Mary. Across the York River from Yorktown, the Gloucester Point campus is 42 acres. Watermen's Hall (opened 1984) was the first new academic building on the Gloucester Point campus in 30 years. A research facility was opened at Gloucester Point in 1997. Hurricane Isabel destroyed some small buildings and two piers on the campus in 2003. After the 1975-built oyster hatchery was torn down, the Acuff Center for Aquaculture was finished in 2022.

The VIMS Eastern Shore Laboratory is a field station in Wachapreague along the Atlantic Ocean. A research facility along the Rappahannock River, the Kauffman Aquaculture Center, was built to study introduced species of shellfish. Its present primary use is studying Crassostrea virginica.

== See also ==
- History of the College of William & Mary
- History of Williamsburg, Virginia
