= Susan F. Ferree =

American journalist and social activist

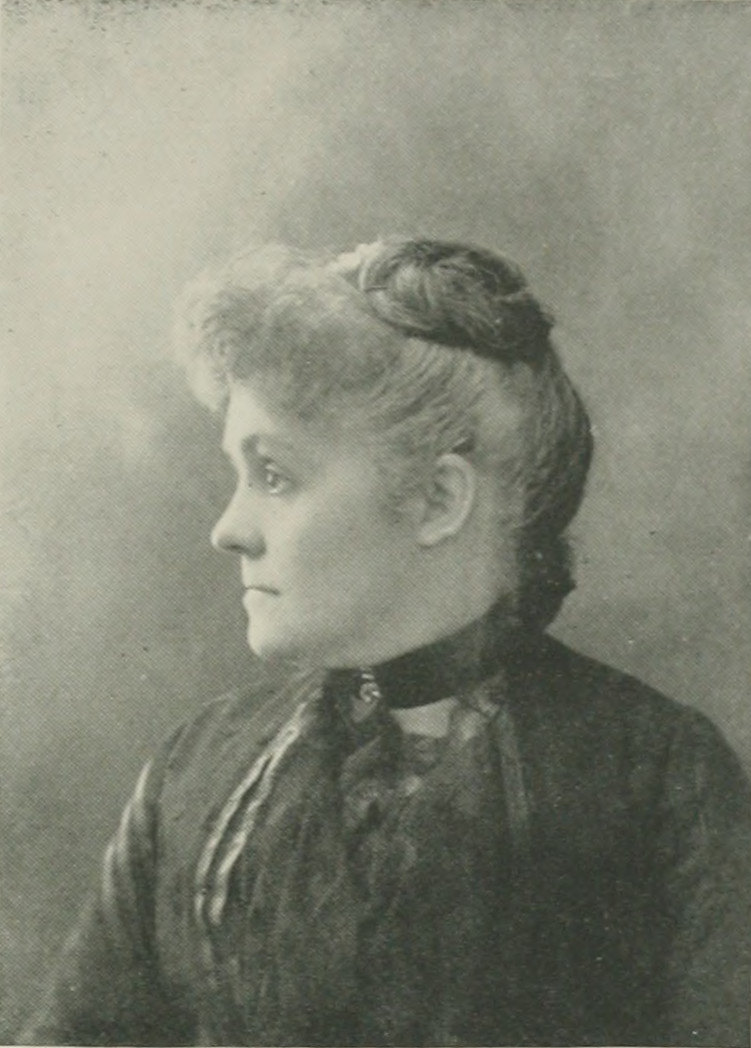
- Photo in A Woman of the Century
- Born: Susan Frances Nelson; January 14, 1844; Mount Pleasant, Iowa, U.S.
- Died: September 6, 1919 (aged 75)
- Occupations: journalist and social reformer
- Spouse: Jerome Dial Ferree (m. 1860)
- Relatives: Thomas "Scotch Tom" Nelson, William Nelson, Thomas Nelson Jr.

Susan F. Ferree (née, Nelson; January 14, 1844 - September 6, 1919) was an American journalist and social reformer from Iowa. Ferree served as a Washington, D.C. newspaper correspondent. She favored women's suffrage and women's rights. She was affiliated with the Woman's Christian Temperance Union (WCTU), Order of the Eastern Star, Woman's Relief Corps (WRC), and the Daughters of the American Revolution (DAR).

== Biography ==
Susan Frances Nelson was born in Mount Pleasant, Iowa, January 14, 1844. Her parents were Frances S. Wray Nelson and John S. Nelson, who was a lineal descent of Thomas "Scotch Tom" Nelson, the founder of Old York, Virginia. His oldest son, William Nelson, was at one time president of the king's council. William's oldest son, Thomas Nelson Jr., was one of the signers of the Declaration of Independence, and the war governor of Virginia. At the age of one year she, with her parents removed to Keokuk, Iowa, which was her home for many years.

Ferree wrote poetry, but her forte was journalism, especially her newspaper correspondence from Washington, D.C. She supported temperance and the advancement of woman.

She was a member of the Order of the Eastern Star, WRC, the Iowa Woman's Suffrage Association, DAR, and the local WCTU. In religion, Ferree was Episcopalian, and a communicant of St. Mary's Episcopal Church, of Ottumwa.

== Personal life ==
In 1860, she married Jerome Dial Ferree (1838–1914), a business man, in Ottumwa, Iowa. By 1908, she had removed to San Diego, California. In 1913, he filed for divorce on grounds of abandonment.

She was one of several Southern California residents who formerly resided in Wapello County, Iowa that were present at the picnic in Eastlake Park, Ottumwa, Iowa, March 1911.

At the time of her death, she was a resident of Spreckels, California. Susan Ferree died September 6, 1919. Interment was in Independent Order of Odd Fellows Cemetery, Salinas, California.
