= Lord Botetourt =

Lord Botetourt is a name attributed to holders of the title of Baron Botetourt, particularly colonial Virginia governor Norborne Berkeley, 4th Baron Botetourt.

Lord Botetourt may refer to:

== People ==
- Baron Botetourt, an English peerage title
  - John Botetourt, 1st Baron Botetourt (d. 1324)
  - John Botetourt, 2nd Baron Botetourt (d. 1385), grandson
  - Joan Burnell, 3rd Baroness Botetourt (d. January 1, 1406)
  - Norborne Berkeley, 4th Baron Botetourt (d. October 15, 1770)
  - Henry Somerset, 5th Duke of Beaufort, 5th Baron Botetourt (1744 – October 11, 1803)
  - Henry Charles Somerset, 6th Duke of Beaufort, 6th Baron Botetourt (1766–1835)
  - Henry Somerset, 7th Duke of Beaufort, 7th Baron Botetourt (1792–1853)
  - Henry Charles FitzRoy Somerset, 8th Duke of Beaufort, 8th Baron Botetourt (1824–1899)
  - Henry Adelbert Wellington FitzRoy Somerset, 9th Duke of Beaufort, 9th Baron Botetourt (1847–1924)
  - Henry Hugh Arthur Somerset, 10th Duke of Beaufort, 10th Baron Botetourt (1900–1984)

== Other ==
- Lord Botetourt, a pair of statues from 1772 and 1993 depicting Norborne Berkeley, including the first statue in Virginia and the oldest public statue in North America
- Botetourt Medal, academic award named for Norborne Berkeley at the College of William & Mary
- Lord Botetourt High School, a grade 9-12 high school located in Daleville, Virginia serving southern Botetourt County.
