= Norborne Berkeley, 4th Baron Botetourt =

British politician and colonial administrator (1717–1770)

The Right Honourable The Lord Botetourt
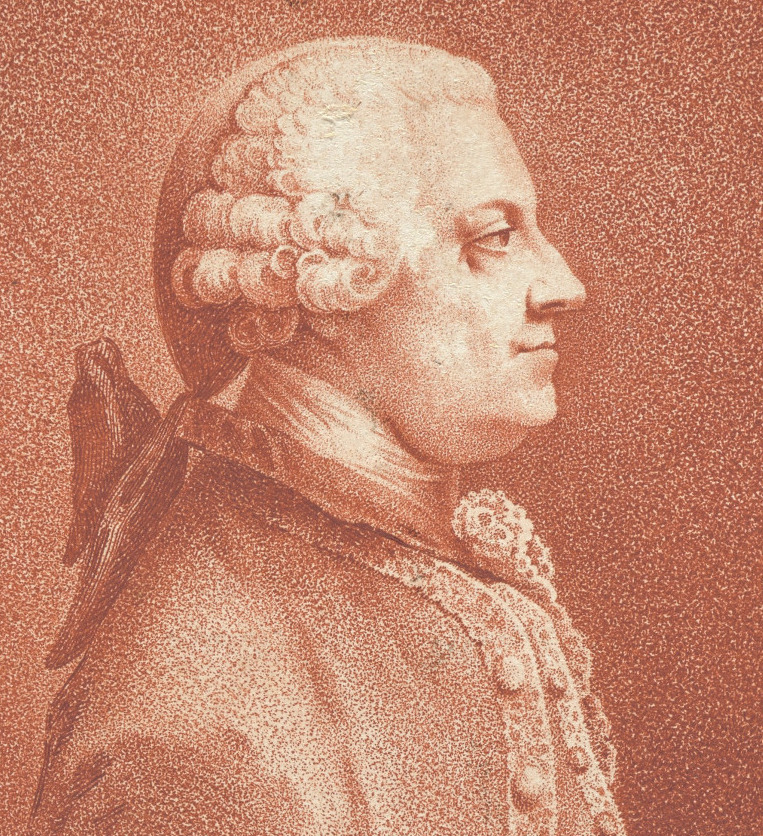
- Portrait by Harry Ashby, 1774

Governor of Virginia
- In office 1768–1770
- Monarch: George III
- Preceded by: Francis Fauquier
- Succeeded by: William Nelson

Lord Lieutenant of Gloucestershire
- In office 1762–1766
- Preceded by: John Howe, 2nd Baron Chedworth
- Succeeded by: Frederick Berkeley, 5th Earl of Berkeley

Member of Parliament for Gloucestershire
- In office 1741–1763
- Preceded by: Benjamin Bathurst
- Succeeded by: Thomas Tracy

Personal details
- Born: c. 1717 Stoke Gifford, Gloucestershire
- Died: 15 October 1770 (aged 52–53) Governor's Palace, Williamsburg, Virginia
- Resting place: Wren Building
- Party: Tory
- Children: Charles
- Education: Westminster School

Norborne Berkeley, 4th Baron Botetourt (c. 1717 – 15 October 1770) was a British Tory politician and colonial administrator who served as the governor of Virginia from 1768 to 1770, when he died in office. While serving as rector at the College of William & Mary, Berkeley endowed the creation of the Botetourt Medal, an award to incentivize student scholarship. After his death, the Virginia General Assembly commissioned Richard Hayward to produce Lord Botetourt, a marble statue depicting Berkeley that stood in the Capitol in Williamsburg. The original survives on the campus of the college, while a replica stands in front of the college's Wren Building.

== Origins ==
Berkeley's coat of arms

Norborne Berkeley was born about 1717, the only son of John Symes Berkeley of Stoke Gifford, Gloucestershire by his second wife Elizabeth Norborne, a daughter and co-heiress of Walter Norborne of Calne, Wiltshire and the widow of Edward Devereux, 8th Viscount Hereford. The Berkeleys of Stoke Gifford were descended from Maurice de Berkeley (d.1347), who died at the Siege of Calais, who had acquired the manor of Stoke Gifford in 1337, the second son of Maurice de Berkeley, 2nd Baron Berkeley, 7th feudal baron of Berkeley (1271–1326), Maurice the Magnanimous, of Berkeley Castle. His descendant Sir Thomas Berkeley (d.1361) of Uley, Gloucestershire married Katherine Botetourt (d.1388), a daughter and co-heiress of John Botetourt, 2nd Baron Botetourt. His son and heir was Sir Maurice Berkeley (1358–1400), of Uley and Stoke Gifford, MP for Gloucestershire in 1391.

== Life ==
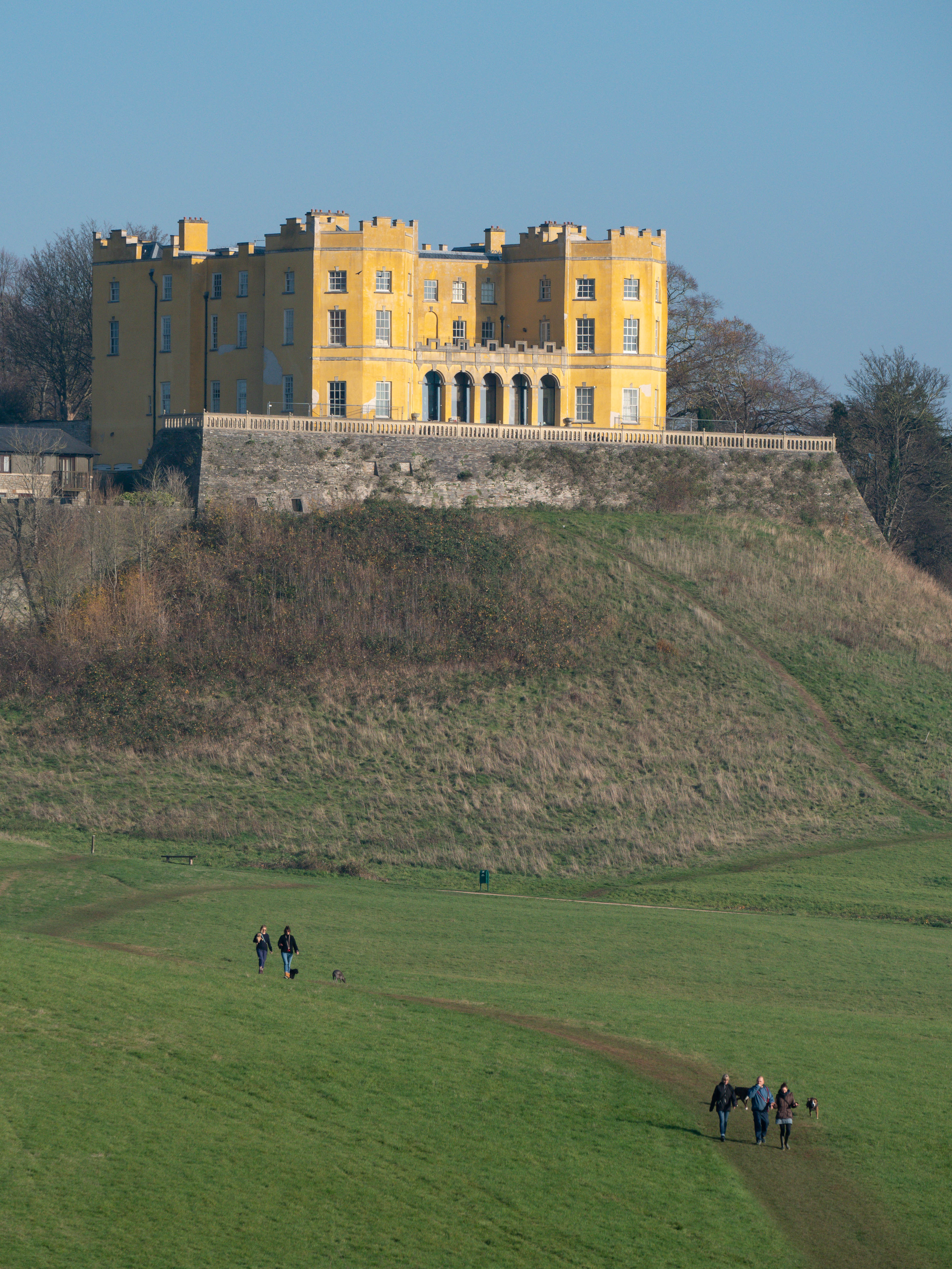
The Dower House

In 1726, Berkeley was admitted to Westminster School. He succeeded his father to Stoke Park in Stoke Gifford in 1736 and remodelled both the house (now known as the Dower House) and the gardens in the 1740s and 1750s with the help of the designer Thomas Wright of Durham.

He was appointed Colonel of the newly raised South Gloucestershire Militia and commanded it from 1758 to 1766.

His political career began in 1741 when he was elected to the House of Commons as a knight of the shire for Gloucestershire, a seat he held until 1763. (Note: On taking his seat in the Lords as Baron Botetourt, he stood down from the Commons.) Considered a staunch Tory, Berkeley's fortunes were boosted considerably on the accession of George III in 1760, when he was appointed a Groom of the Bedchamber and in 1762 (until 1766) Lord Lieutenant of Gloucestershire. In 1764, almost 400 years after the title went into abeyance through lack of direct heirs, he successfully claimed the title of Baron Botetourt as the lineal descendant of Maurice de Berkeley (d. 1361) and his wife Catherine de Botetourt. He thus took a seat in the House of Lords as the 4th Baron de Botetourt, and in 1767 was appointed a Lord of the Bedchamber to George III.

The Berkeley family owned liberties in the Kingswood coalfield. When William Champion expanded his copper-smelting works at Warmley in 1761, he proposed to local coal owners, also including Charles Whittuck of Hanham Hall and Charles Bragge later Lord Bathurst, that they would supply his works with coal as a monopoly, excluding competition from the other local copper and brass makers, in exchange for partnerships in his new Warmley Company. The large coal owners took this opportunity, and construction began on the new furnaces. However the competing Brass Wire Company, the 'Old Bristol Company' was still able to obtain enough coal locally from small collieries who leased from the larger coal lords. The coal prices paid by the Old Bristol company, including advance payments, even encouraged development of these small pits, with new horse-driven winding engines and even talk of the new steam engines for mine drainage. The monopoly plan did not succeed and the market for both coal and copper was saturated. By 1765 the new company had grown in capacity, but was encountering financial difficulties. The major shareholders were Champion, the new Baron Botetourt, Bragge and Whittuck. Other local landowners and bankers, including Botetourt's coal viewer Charles Arthur, held smaller holdings but the company was under-capitalised; a planned share capital of £50,000 had only been subscribed to £29,000. Efforts were made to re-organise the company in order to bring in more funds by making the existing shares transferable and so saleable through the stock market, but these were complicated, long-winded and had to be carried out in secrecy from the competitors. (Note: See downfall of William Champion for the complexities resulting from the Bubble Act.) In 1768, the Company began to collapse. Champion, fearing a collapse, was discovered having tried to secretly withdraw some of his capital and was then dismissed from the company that he had founded. Bragge wrote to Botetourt that he had been "completely ruined by the consequence of my former infatuation". Botetourt was himself in debt, his holdings in the Warmley Company were finally tradeable but now almost worthless and he was in no position to subscribe further money to shore up the company. He fled to America.

Despite having fled in 1768 to avoid his debts in England, Botetourt was still in political favour and prospered in America, being appointed Governor of Virginia. In Virginia, he acquired ownership over several slaves, including an enslaved woman named Hannah.

== Treaty of Fort Stanwix ==
The final Treaty was signed on 5 November 1768 which established a Line of Property following the Ohio River that gave the Kentucky portion of the Virginia Colony to the British Crown, as well as most of what is now West Virginia. The treaty also settled land claims between the Iroquois and the Penn family; the lands thereby acquired by American colonists in Pennsylvania were known as the New Purchase. This new Treaty sparked requests for additional surveys to be completed in the region.

In a letter addressed to Berkeley dated 23 December 1768, Berkeley received a petition from forty signatories requesting for leave to take up and survey forty-five thousand acres of land lying on the eastern side of the Ohio River on the lower side of the Little Kanawha River having lately been recognized by the Six Nations of Indians. The names of the requestees were: George Rogers, John Winston, Phillip Pendleton, John Hawkins, William Plumer Thurston, John Todd, John Rice, Nathaniel Pendleton, Bernard Moore, William Overton, Winston Joseph Rogers, John Rogers, William Smith, Augustine Moore, John Pendleton, James Winston, Lewis Webb, Benjamin Lewis, Henry Pendleton, John Page Jr., Warner Lewis Jr., Thomas Jefferson, Thomas Strachan, John Walker, Alexander Donald, John Johnson, Patrick Morton, Richard Surls, Joseph Coleman, Ambrose Powell, James Boyd, Edward Green, Edward Brown, Thomas Dowel, John McColley, Peter Ferguson, John Sutton, Joseph Hail, Edward Baber, William Shinall, Thomas White, William Dandridge Jr., Isaac Davis, Mordecai Hord, and William Carr.

He died in Williamsburg on 15 October 1770, after an illness lasting several weeks. Botetourt never married and left no legitimate heirs. Stoke Park passed to his sister Elizabeth, who continued his improvements.

== Statues ==
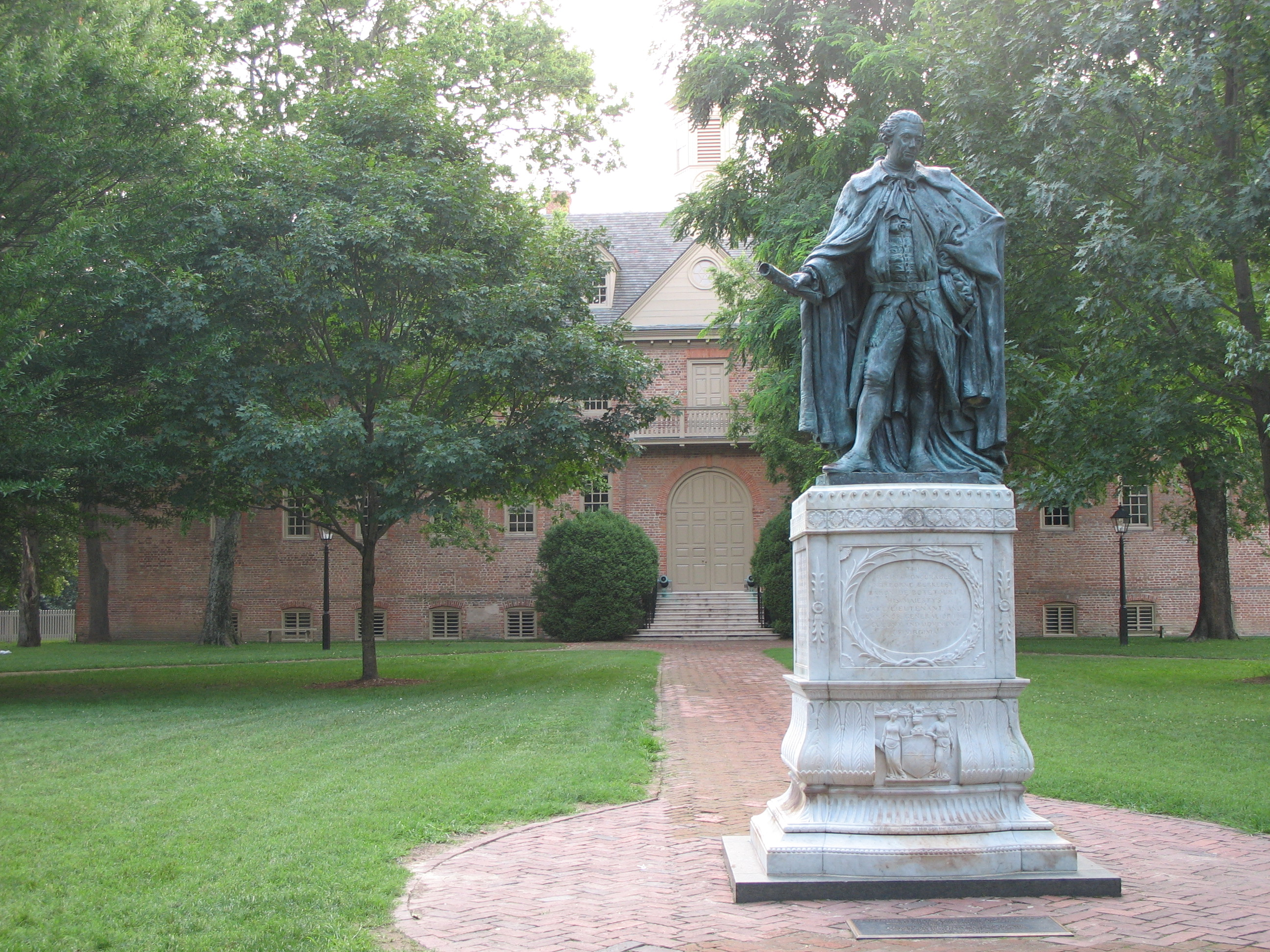
The 1993 statue in the Old College Yard

A statue of Botetourt was placed in the Capitol in Williamsburg in 1773. The Capital of Colonial Virginia was located in Williamsburg from 1699 until 1780, but at the urging of Governor Thomas Jefferson was moved to Richmond for security reasons during the American Revolution. In 1801 the statue of Botetourt was acquired by the College of William and Mary and moved to the campus from the former Capitol building. Barring a brief period during the Civil War when it was moved to the Public Asylum for safety, it stood in the College Yard until 1958 when it was removed for protection from the elements, and then in 1966 was installed in the new Earl Gregg Swem Library, in the new Botetourt Gallery. In 1993, as the college celebrated its tercentenary, a new bronze statue of Botetourt by William and Mary alumnus Gordon Kray was installed in the College Yard in front of the Wren Building, in the place occupied for generations by the original.

== Legacy ==
Botetourt County, Virginia, was named in Botetourt's honour. Historians also believe that Berkeley County, West Virginia, and the town of Berkeley Springs, both now in West Virginia, were also named in his honour, or possibly that of another popular colonial governor, Sir William Berkeley.

Lord Botetourt High School in the town of Daleville in Botetourt County, Virginia, is also named for him, as is the Botetourt Dorm Complex at The College of William and Mary. Two statues also adorn the campus of The College of William and Mary. Gloucester County, Virginia has an elementary school named for the governor. Both Richmond, Virginia and Norfolk, Virginia have streets named in his honour.

Parliament of Great Britain
Preceded by Thomas Chester; Benjamin Bathurst	Member of Parliament for Gloucestershire; 1741–1763; With: Thomas Chester	Succeeded by Thomas Chester; Thomas Tracy
Honorary titles
Preceded by The Lord Ducie	Vice-Admiral of Gloucestershire; 1762–1766	Succeeded by The Earl of Berkeley
Preceded by The Lord Chedworth	Lord Lieutenant of Gloucestershire; 1762–1766	Succeeded by The Earl of Berkeley
Peerage of England
In abeyance Title last held by Joan Burnell	Baron Botetourt; 1764–1770	In abeyance Title next held by Henry Somerset
