= William Nelson Jr. =

American lawyer and politician (1762–1799)

William Nelson

Member of the Virginia House of Delegates from York County, Virginia
- In office June 23, 1788 – September 30, 1792 Serving with Robert Shield
- Preceded by: Thomas Nelson Jr.
- Succeeded by: Benjamin Carter Waller

Member of the Virginia House of Delegates from James City County, Virginia
- In office May 5, 1783 – May 4, 1784 Serving with William Norvell
- Preceded by: Nathaniel Burwell
- Succeeded by: William Walker

Personal details
- Born: 1754 Yorktown, Colony of Virginia
- Died: 1813 (aged 58–59) Williamsburg, Virginia
- Resting place: Grace Church (Yorktown, Virginia), Yorktown, Virginia
- Spouse(s): Mary Hartwell Taliaferro; Abby Byrd
- Relations: Thomas Nelson Jr. (brother)
- Children: 6 daughters
- Parent: William Nelson Sr., (father)
- Education: College of William and Mary
- Occupation: law professor, lawyer, politician

William Nelson Jr. (1754-March 8, 1813) was a Virginia soldier, fighting in the American Revolutionary War, politician and judge. Nelson later served in the Virginia House of Delegates (variously representing James City and York Counties) as well as on the Virginia Executive Council before becoming a judge and law professor at the College of William and Mary. Complicating matters, not only his father, but his somewhat older cousin (the firstborn son of his uncle Thomas) shared the same name and distinguished himself in the conflict as well as became clerk of Caroline County, and another distant relative much later represented Hanover County in the Virginia House of Delegates.

== Early and family life ==
The fifth child born to the former Elizabeth Burwell, and her husband, merchant and planter William Nelson, who was by then a member of the Virginia Governor's Council and would later serve as its president and even as acting governor after a governor's death in office. His eldest brother Thomas Nelson, who served as one of this boy's guardians after their father's death in 1772) had already begun his political and military career. As a student at the College of William and Mary in Williamsburg he studied law under George Wythe. His best friend was William Short, whose family had lived for five generations across the James River in Surry County.

== Military ==
As the Revolutionary War began, Nelson and Short enrolled in the student militia, and Nelson accepted a commission as second lieutenant in 1777. During the war's final campaign, British soldiers under the command of Banastre Tarleton captured Nelson and his brother Robert at Castle Hill, the residence of Dr. Thomas Walker, in Albemarle County.

== Career ==
Admitted to the Virginia bar after the war, Nelson had an active legal practice in the 1780s. During his legislative service described below, he and colleagues produced the Revised Code of Virginia of 1792 (published 2 years later).

James City County voters elected Nelson as one of their representatives in the Virginia House of Delegates in 1783, but he served only one term before being elected on November 27, 1783 to the Council of State (the then-executive branch) on which he served until November 1785. In 1788, York County voters elected Nelson as well as Robert Shield as their representatives to the Virginia House of Delegates (Nelson succeeding his elder brother), and re-elected the pair until fellow legislators elected Nelson as a judge, then voters elected Benjamin Carter Waller to succeed him in the part-time legislative position.

In 1791, fellow legislators elected Nelson as a judge of the General Court. During his judicial career, Judge Nelson sat at various times at Suffolk (the seat of Nansemond County), Richmond (the state capital) and Winchester (then the seat of vast Frederick County).

Nelson succeeded St. George Tucker as professor of law and police at the law school of the College of William and Mary in 1804, and continued to teach students until his death in 1813, at which time he was succeeded by his younger cousin Robert Nelson (1778-1818).

== Personal life ==
This William Nelson married twice. His first wife, Mary Hartwell Taliaferro, died on January 5, 1786. Their daughter Elizabeth married Capt. Thompson of the HMS Ripon and returned to England with him. Nelson remarried, to Abigail Willing Byrd, daughter of William Byrd III, who bore five daughters. During that marriage, Nelson lived at Westover in Charles City County. Lucy married Benjamin Harrison VII of Charles City County and bore sons and daughters before her death in 1816. Their daughter Evelyn married John Page and moved to what was then Frederick County (but is now Clarke County), as did their unmarried sisters Abigail Byrd Nelson and Ann Rosalie Nelson (both of whom survived the American Civil War and died in Millwood in 1868).

== Death and legacy ==
Nelson died in Williamsburg and was buried in the family plot at Grace Church (Yorktown, Virginia).
