= Nathaniel Burwell =

American politician

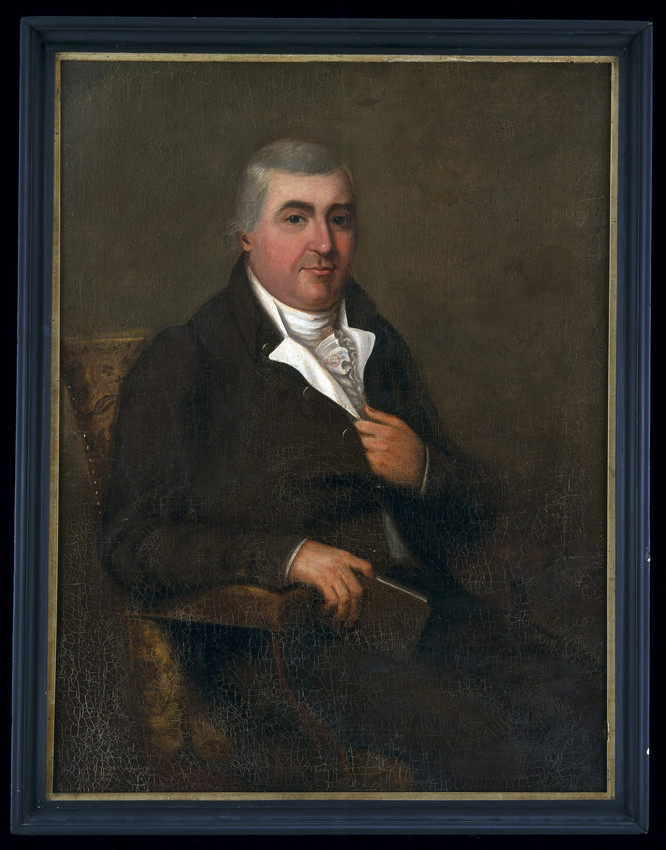

Delegate for James City County
- In office May 4, 1778 – April 30, 1780 Serving with William Norvell
- Preceded by: Robert Carter Nicholas
- Succeeded by: James Innes
- In office May 1782 – May 4, 1783
- Preceded by: Joseph Prentis
- Succeeded by: William Nelson Jr.

Personal details
- Born: April 15, 1750 Carter's Grove
- Died: March 29, 1814 (aged 63) Carter Hall
- Spouse(s): Susanna Grymes (1772 - 1788, her death); Lucy Page Baylor (1789 - 1814, his death)
- Children: 16
- Parent(s): Carter Burwell; Lucy Ludwell Grymes
- Relatives: Robert Carter I (great-grandfather)

Nathaniel Burwell (April 15, 1750 – March 29, 1814) was an American politician and plantation owner. Perhaps the most distinguished of five men of that name to serve in the Virginia General Assembly before the American Civil War (as distinguished below), this Nathaniel Burwell won election to the Virginia House of Delegates as well as the Virginia Ratifying Convention, and also served as the county lieutenant for the James City County militia.

== Personal life ==
Burwell was born on April 15, 1750, at Carter's Grove in James City County, Virginia, to the former Lucy Ludwell Grymes and her husband Carter Burwell (1718—1756). He was born into the First Families of Virginia and named after his paternal grandfather Nathaniel Burwell (1680–1721), who had inherited the family plantation in Gloucester County (while his younger brothers inherited lands in York County and adjacent James City County when they came of legal age). His father (this Nathaniel's paternal great-grandfather) Lewis Burwell was the progenitor of the Burwell family of Virginia and held high political office until his teenage daughter Lucy rejected colonial governor Francis Nicholson as an unwelcome suitor. Her three surviving brothers, as well as several grandsons and great-grandsons were elected to the House of Burgesses when they came of age. After marrying Elizabeth Carter of Middlesex County the year of his father's death, the elder Nathaniel Burwell established a home at Fairfield across the York River in 1709. He would mingle with other Virginia gentry and represented Jamestown and later Gloucester County in the Virginia General Assembly.

Although the elder Nathaniel's widow remarried well, to Dr. George Nicholas (1685—1734), who helped raise her two sons and two daughters, her wealthy father Robert "King" Carter (1663—1732) purchased approximately 1,400 acres (570 ha) in Martin's Hundred at the eastern end of James City County and also bought African slaves to work the new plantation. Nathaniel Senior's eldest son Lewis Burwell (1710–1754) received his father's Gloucester plantations (5,080 acres (2,060 ha) in 1732). Not only did the younger son Carter Burwell turn his somewhat smaller inheritance from his maternal grandfather (and guardian until his death) into a profitable plantation (still using enslaved labor), upon reaching legal age and assuming control from the successor guardian he also followed his father political career as one of James City County's delegates to the House of Burgesses in 1742—1747, 1748—1749 and 1751—1755 (alongside Benjamin Waller after his cousin Lewis died in 1744), and built the historic house (now part of Colonial Williamsburg and the National Register of Historic Places) where this Nathaniel was born. However, his wife would also become a young widow, and remarried to widower William Nelson (who would succeed King Carter as trustee for his grandsons, as well as served as a Burgess and later briefly as the colony's Governor). This Nathaniel formally took possession of Carter Burwell's property in 1771, when he reached legal age. Before that time, as his second guardian and eventual stepfather William Nelson ran the plantations, Nathaniel followed Burwell family tradition and attended the College of William & Mary, where he was one of the first two students to be awarded the Botetourt Medal for academic achievement.

Following another family tradition, not long after taking full control of the various inherited plantations, Nathaniel Burwell married Susanna Grymes (1752—1788) on November 28, 1772. They had eight children before Susanna died in 1788. Burwell remarried a year later, to Lucy Page Baylor (1759—1843), who bore another eight children and survived him by decades.

== Political career ==
Burwell became one of the justices of the peace for James City County in 1772 (the justices then jointy also governing counties in that era). Two years later he began serving on the county's Committee of Safety. He won election to the Virginia House of Delegates for two concurrent years, 1778 and 1779, serving alongside William Norvell. After a gap, Burwell won re-election for a third term during 1782.

Six years later in 1788, James City County voters elected Burwell and Robert Andrews to represent them in the Virginia Ratifying Convention, concerning the proposed Federal Constitution. Burwell did not actively debate, but did vote for its ratification.

Burwell led the local James City County militia before the war, but after his wife's death in 1788, spent more and more time with the estates he had inherited from his maternal grandfather considerably to the west in Frederick County, Virginia, not far from the Shenandoah Valley and the Potomac River (and which later became Millwood in Clarke County, Virginia). Initially, Burwell had only visited the semi-mountain area in the summers, but with the assistance of neighbor and former Revolutionary War general Daniel Morgan began erecting a permanent residence in 1790. He called the new house about a half mile from the village (named for his gristmill and where he leased property since 1785 to erect a tannery) Carter Hall.

== Planter and slaveowner ==
In addition to using enslaved labor on his own estates (including Carter's Grove), this Nathaniel Burwell served as guardian of his nephew Nathaniel Bacon Burwell (1759—1791) and managed the properties known as King's Creek and the Lightfoot quarter that the youth inherited from his father James Burwell (this Nathaniel's uncle). Within five miles of the Carter Grove plantation were auxiliary plantations (all using enslaved labor) known as New Quarter, Foaces, Black Swamp and Abraham's, as well as his cousin Lewis Burwell's plantation at Kingsmill and the adjacent North Quarters and Bray Quarters (a/k/a Utopia), and his uncle's Fairfield plantation across the York River and his cousin Robert's farms in Isle of Wight county down the James River.

According to Carter Burwell's will, his slaves were to be kept as part of the family estate until this Nathaniel came of age, although some purchased from Mann Page and living in the Neck of Land quarter were to eventually become the property of his younger son Carter Burwell II (1754—1776). Some of the daughters (through their husbands) contested the will, so the estate did not finally settle until 1779, when this Nathaniel retained almost all the slaves, repurchasing some of the Neck of Land Quarter slaves from the husband of one of his sisters. Meanwhile, guardian William Nelson had (in addition to hiring out some slaves), switched farming strategies from tobacco (which tended to make land infertile after several years, although it accounted for half of plantation revenues in the 1760s) to products for the expanding Williamsburg market, including corn, wheat and livestock (for meat and butter), and processing cider and cutting firewood. This prudent management strategy (unusual for a nonresident owner) raised gross revenues per hand from about £12 in the early 1760s to £18 by the time Nathaniel reached legal age in 1771, higher returns than most large planters had achieved in the 1750s.

According to Thomas Jefferson, Nathaniel Burwell gained a reputation as "one of the most skillful managers in the country, and of untainted integrity." He built a new mill at the Carter's Grove plantation in 1772, so three years later he was supplying customers in Williamsburg and Yorktown; by 1774 he stopped growing tobacco at Carter's Grove and only grew enough corn for his livestock, together with more wheat and oats for the horses, as well as concentrated the artisans and carters as well as his horses there. During the revolutionary war years, Burwell hauled surplus wool to Frederick county for sale, but his primary market was Williamsburg, where he sold meat, flour, fodder, cider, butter and milk. He also used his excess bran from the mill to feed hogs, and traded in whiskey (from his new distillery in Frederick county as West Indian rum grew difficult to procure) and firewood, both in great demand. However, he continued to grow tobacco on his best lands into the 1800s, including the Foaces and New Quarter plantation.

During much of his time in James City County, Nathaniel Burwell served as an officer of the local James City County militia (with the rank of colonel), and also served on the board of governors of the Williamsburg hospital. During the Revolutionary War years, local planters feared rumors of slave revolts, especially after Governor Dunmore, in his ship offshore, threatened to arm slaves and reduce Williamsburg to ashes. However, none of Nathaniel Burwell's slaves are known to have escaped to join Dunmore, although one mulatto boy who served John Blair in Williamsburg before being sold to Lewis Burwell IV of the troubled Kingsmill plantation did escape, to his owner's dismay. Slaves also escaped from the Isle of Wight, King's Creek and Fairfield quarters plantations held by relatives.

When the state capitol moved to Richmond in 1780, sales of Burwell's butter, wool and fodder declined precipitously, although the Continental Army's and French military's demands for supplies during the final campaign at Yorktown helped offset those losses. After the war, Burwell began renting more land to tenants. During his minority, four white families had rented land; by 1782 he had 14 tenants, many of whom stayed into the 1810s despite his own move toward the Shenandoah Valley, and of them at least seven were free blacks whose families had long lived in York County (but not as Burwell property). After his move westward, Burwell made additional leases to 31 tenants, including at least 10 free black families. However, Burwell never chose to manumit any of his slaves.

In 1792 Burwell gave some of his children the James City County plantations and moved the rest of his family and many slaves to his western estates. By early 1797, he had moved most of the agricultural laborers from Carter's Grove, leaving only enough to keep the great house running. Col. Nathaniel Burwell at his peak owned 8000 acres and worked more than 200 slaves in Frederick County; the next largest landowners only possessing 53, 43 and 28 slaves. In 1804 Burwell turned over the old home plantation in the Tidewater to his eldest son, Carter Burwell III (1773–1819), including twelve taxable slaves.

During the War of 1812, British ships and troops entered Chesapeake Bay and the waters off Hampton Roads threatening his family's Tidewater landholdings, as well as merchant shipping and the state government. In February 1813, Governor Barbour ordered 2000 militiamen into service, concentrated at Norfolk. Major Nathaniel Burwell (perhaps his son who had purchased General Morgan's Saratoga estate in Frederick County, else his King William County cousin described below) was in Gloucester County and wrote of a threatened slave insurrection, noting that his men had apprehended and jailed ten slaves for questioning.

== Death, family and legacy ==
This Nathaniel Burwell died at Carter Hall on March 29, 1814, and was buried at the Old Chapel Cemetery nearby. His gravestone notes his military rank as "Colonel" and that he donated the land for the chapel and graveyard (now also on the National Register of Historic Places). He had more than 16 children, including another Nathaniel Burwell (1779–1849) who in 1809 bought Saratoga (Boyce, Virginia) from Gen. Morgan. Nathaniel Jr. helped to form Clarke County from the eastern part Frederick County, and at nearly 2400 acres and 52 slaves was its largest landowner. He served as one its justices of the peace at various times, as well as its joint delegate in the Virginia General Assembly with neighboring Warren County (which the Castleman family dominated politically).

This Nathaniel's estate was not settled until his widow's death in 1843, she having outlived all but five of this Nathaniel's 16 children. This Nathaniel's firstborn and heir, Carter Burwell III, only survived him by five years, and he had a sickly son. His widow remarried but her next husband and a series of administrators ran through those assets, such that the remaining Carter Grove bondspeople were soon hired out or sold, and that property left the Burwell family in 1838. This Nathaniel's youngest son, Thomas H. N. Burwell (1805–1841), returned to York County and bought out some remaining heirs, and perhaps some slaves. This Nathaniel Burwell grandson (through his son William Nelson Burwell of 'Glenowen' (1791—1822)) Nathaniel Burwell (1819—1896) was a judge or justice of the peace for Clarke County during the American Civil War, after authorizing procurement of arms for the Confederacy in early 1861. During that conflict, this Nathaniel Burwell's longest lived son, George Harrison Burwell (1799—1873) operated Carter Hall and let General Stonewall Jackson encamp on the property in the fall 1862. He also had a dozen children, including Private Nathaniel Burwell (1838—1862), who died that fall of wounds incurred fighting for the Confederacy in the Stonewall Brigade at the Second Battle of Bull Run.

Three sons of Nathaniel Burwell (1819—1896) became Confederate officers, with Robert dying of wounds received at the Battle of Brandy Station, George surviving the war but moving to and dying in Mexico, and sons Philip, John and William surviving and becoming physicians; their youngest brother Thomas (1861—1923) became a farmer and inherited Carter Hall.

== Non-direct relative legislators ==
Another veteran (and relative through great-grandfather Lewis Burwell III) Nathaniel Burwell (1750–1801), sometimes called "Major" Burwell, was likewise born in 1750 (but at Kings Mill in King William County) and represented King William County alongside Robert Pollard in the House of Delegates in the 1799—1800 and 1800-1801 sessions before his death at "Vermont Place" in that county. His wife was Martha Diggs. They had seven children (including another Nathaniel, as well as Thomas and Dudley Diggs Burwell and four daughters).

Another more distant relative, also Nathaniel Burwell, represented Roanoke County in the House of Delegates for a single term, 1842—1843.
