= Thomas Chester (1696–1763) =

British Tory politician (1696-1763)

Thomas Chester (2 May 1696 – 1763) of Almondsbury and Knole, near Bristol, was a British Tory politician who sat in the House of Commons between 1727 and 1763.

Chester was the eldest son of Thomas Chester of Almondsbury and his wife Anne Astry, daughter of Sir Samuel Astry of Henbury, Gloucestershire. In 1704, he succeeded his father. He matriculated at Oriel College, Oxford in 1713. He married Lady Sarah Henrietta Howard daughter of Henry Howard, 6th Earl of Suffolk on 25 September 1721. She died without issue in April 1722.

At the 1727 British general election, Chester was one of four Members returned as Member of Parliament for Gloucester in a double return. He withdrew under a compromise. At the 1734 British general election, he was returned successfully as Tory MP for Gloucestershire with Beaufort support. He was returned again in 1741 and 1747, and always voted against the Government.

Chester was returned unopposed at the 1754 British general election and again at the 1761 British general election. He was only once recorded as having spoken in Parliament on 13 March 1763, during the debate on the cider tax, but was inaudible.

Chester married as his second wife Mary Guinnet, widow of George Guinnet and daughter of Jeremy Gough of London on 28 February 1736. He died without issue on 1 October 1763.

Parliament of Great Britain
Preceded by John Howe; Charles Hyett	Member of Parliament for Gloucester; 1727; With: Matthew Ducie Moreton; Benjamin Bathurst; Charles Selwyn	Succeeded by Benjamin Bathurst; Charles Selwyn
Preceded by Hon. Henry Berkeley; Sir John Dutton, Bt	Member of Parliament for Gloucestershire; 1734–1763; With: Benjamin Bathurst; Norborne Berkeley; Thomas Tracy	Succeeded by Edward Southwell; Thomas Tracy
