= Thomas Nelson (secretary) =

American planter and politician

Member of the Virginia Governor's Council
- In office 1745-1775
- Succeeded by: position abolished

Member of the House of Burgesses representing York County
- In office 1742–1745 Serving with Edward Digges
- Preceded by: William Nelson
- Succeeded by: John Norton

Personal details
- Born: 1716 Yorktown, Virginia
- Died: 1782 (aged 65–66) Yorktown, Virginia
- Spouse: Lucy Armistead
- Parent(s): Thomas "Scotch Tom" Nelson, Margaret Reade

Thomas Nelson (1716 – 1782) was an American merchant, planter and politician from Yorktown, Virginia, who served in both houses of the Virginia General Assembly during the colonial period, as well as the colony's deputy secretary (responsible for land records). He advocated for the colony's interests against British policies under the last colonial governor, and served as the last president of the Governor's Council. Although he refused to sit on its successor and retired from public life citing his age and infirmities, Nelson's sons served in the patriot armies and he witnessed the destruction of his house (which had become British General Cornwallis' headquarters) during the final Battle of Yorktown.

== Early life and education ==
Nelson was born in 1716, the second son of Margaret Reade and her merchant husband Thomas "Scotch Tom" Nelson. His maternal grandfather, the former burgess and sometimes acting Governor, Col. George Reade had owned significant property in York County, near the capital of the Colony of Virginia (which in 1699 transferred from Jamestown to Williamsburg which straddled James City and York Counties), although his son Robert Reade did not continue his political officeholding which this generation would resume. His father had immigrated from Cumbria circa 1690, then settled in newly-established Yorktown about 1705. He became the port town's leading merchant. His eldest son (this man's brother) William succeeded to the family's mercantile business, after both sons were educated in England. They had a sister, Mary, who ultimately married Edmund Burwell, a younger son of what would be known as the First Families of Virginia, known for their wealth and political influence. Their mother Margaret had died by 1723, when her widower (this boy's father) remarried, to Frances Housden Tucker. Their father built the (still-surviving) Nelson House about 1730.

== Career ==
In 1742 he was appointed (deputy) secretary of state of Virginia. Nelson succeeded his elder brother and represented York County in the house of burgesses in 1748 and 1749, and in 1749 joined his elder brother William on the Virginia Council of State, becoming its president by 1775 (and possibly immediately after his brother's death.

He was the addressee of a letter from Capt. Montague of HMS 'Fowey' which had been sent to support the last colonial governor, Lord Dunmore. Reportedly he remained popular within the colony, for he was among the men nominated on June 29, 1776, for the new state's first governor, receiving 45 votes to 60 for Patrick Henry. He was chosen to sit on the first privy council for the new commonwealth, but declined the appointment on account of his age and infirmities.

Thus Nelson retired from public life and living his final years quietly in Yorktown, until British General Cornwallis made that home his headquarters, and sent him to the American lines (and General Washington's headquarters). The house was destroyed by French artillery, at Nelson's encouragement since at least two of his sons were serving in the patriot forces.

== Personal life ==
He married Lucy Armistead, who died in 1781. Their three sons actively fought in the patriot cause during the American Revolutionary War. Col. William (1746–1807) served in the Continental Line, including as the battles of Monmouth, Brandywine and commanded artillery during the Battle of Yorktown at the war's end. His plantation, ""The Dorrell" was on the border of Caroline and King William Counties and he long served as the Caroline County clerk. Capt. Thomas Nelson (d. 1804) was the captain of the 1st Virginia Regiment and lived at "Bear Spring" in Hanover County. Major John Nelson (d. 1827) was captain of the 1st Virginia Cavalry Regiment in 1776-1777 and then a volunteer troop of horse in 1779 and in 1782 became major of the Virginia State Cavalry.

== Death and legacy ==
Nelson suffered from gout in his final years.
