= Benjamin Lewis (surveyor) =

Benjamin Lewis (1735–1817) was a Virginia surveyor and soldier in the American Revolutionary War.

== Family ==
In 1771, Lewis married Susannah Nickell and had 10 children: Andrew, Benjamin, Catherine, George Washington Lewis, Isaac, James Ballard Lewis, John Harper Lewis, Mary, Thomas and William. Susannah is the daughter of John Nickell (Nichols) who immigrated from Ulster, Ireland. John's sons Isaac, Thomas, Robert and Andrew all fought in the Battle of Point Pleasant in Lord Dunmore's War in 1774. Isaac fought under Captain John Lewis, his brother-in-law's cousin (nephew of General Andrew Lewis).

== Survey in the Ohio and Kanawha ==
After the Treaty of Fort Stanwix was signed on November 5, 1768, Lewis alongside forty others, which included Thomas Jefferson, Phillip Pendleton, Bernard Moore, and John Page Jr, penned a letter to the Governor of Virginia, Norborne Berkeley, 4th Baron Botetourt dated December 28, 1768. The petition requested additional surveys to be conducted in the Kanawha, Greenbrier and Ohio region. The letter later became known as "Petition of George Rogers and others" due to George Roger's name appearing first in sequence. The letter, while addressed to the Governor, was delivered to the Virginia Governor's Council, General Assembly and House of Burgesses.

== Land Grants ==
On December 12, 1786, Lewis received a 669-acre tract situated "on the north side of the three creeks, adjoining John Rees, Thomas Adams, and Joshua Thorp."

On October 18, 1787, Lewis received a small tract of land amounting to 38 acres "on both sides of Greenbrier River adjoining the lands said Lewis now lives on and the land of John Stuart including his boat landing on both sides of the river."

On October 19, 1787, Lewis received a land grant of 377 acres on the south side of Greenbrier River at a place known by the name of Lewis's Ferry.

On June 28, 1797, Lewis received a 600 tract on Laurel Creek a branch of the Meadow River and some of the waters of Brackens Creek adjoining the land of Robert Young and Henry Banks, a wealthy merchant and business partner of Alexander Hamilton, and Thomas Jefferson.
