= Thomas "Scotch Tom" Nelson =

English businessman and politician

Thomas Scotch Tom Nelson
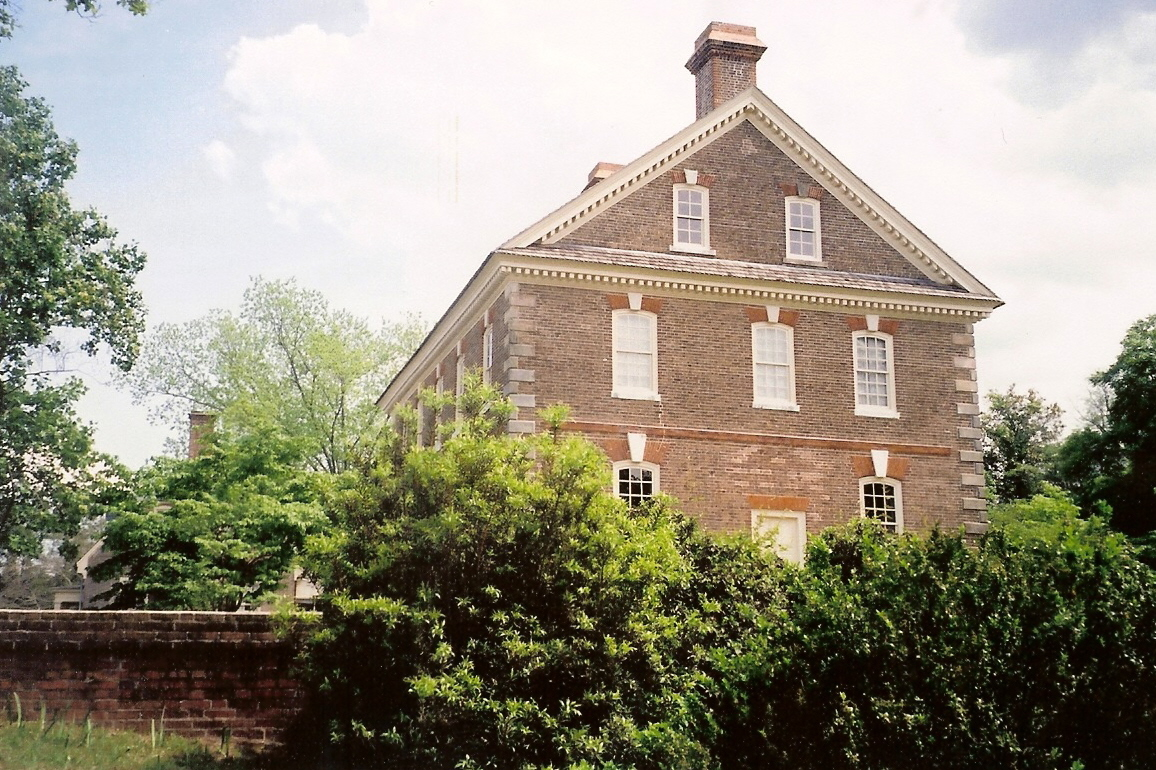
- Nelson's house in Yorktown
- Born: 1677; Penrith, Cumberland, England
- Died: 1747 (aged 69–70)
- Occupations: Businessman, Politician, Merchant
- Children: William Nelson; Thomas Nelson
- Relatives: Thomas Nelson Jr. (grandson); Hugh Nelson (great-grandson)

Thomas "Scotch Tom" Nelson (1677–1747) was an immigrant from England who became a wealthy merchant at Yorktown in the Colony of Virginia. His children married into the First Families of Virginia, achieving not only high social rank but political power, so he is considered the progenitor of one of the First Families of Virginia. The house he built at Yorktown, now named to honor several generations of men sharing the same name, is on the National Register of Historic Places.

== Early life ==
Nelson was son of a cloth merchant in Penrith, Cumberland. His relationship with Captain Francis Nelson of Berkshire, England, who made several voyages to the Virginia colony between 1608 and the winter of 1612-1613 (when he died in a voyage exploring Hudson's Bay) is unknown.

== Virginia career ==
After three voyages to the Virginia colony, possibly as a boatswain on various merchant ships, circa 1705 Nelson used his modest inheritance and accumulated capital to open a store in the newly developing town where the York River flows into Mobjack Bay. During the next four decades, he participated in the triangular trade, shipping Virginia tobacco to Britain or continental ports, and securing manufactured goods and enslaved people on the return trip. In addition to the store, Nelson built wharves and warehouses, as well as a grist mill, and also owned a ship.

== Personal life ==
Nelson married twice. His first wife, and mother of his children, was Margaret Reade, the daughter of Robert Reade and heiress of her paternal grandfather, George Reade. Decades prior, George Reade had married Elizabeth Martiau, the heiress of an early settler and burgess in the area. George Reade held important positions in the colony, including that of the colony's secretary. Reade's sons later held the post as well. Thomas and Margaret's first son, William was born in 1711 and his brother Thomas Nelson II in November 1716, in Yorktown. By the time William's first son (Thomas's first grandson) was born, Scotch Tom was wealthy, owning over 6500 acres of land as well as choice lots in Yorktown and Williamsburg (which had become the colony's capital in 1699). His second wife was the widow Frances Courtenay Tucker.

His son William Nelson (1711–1772) inherited the family business and acquired extensive land holdings throughout the colony. He developed plantations, devoted at first to tobacco and later to mixed crops. William became a powerful politician, serving as both president of the Governor's Council and as acting governor.

His younger son Thomas also served in both houses of the Virginia General Assembly. He married Lucy Burwell Armistead in 1745, in Virginia. They were the parents of at least 4 sons and 1 daughter. He died in 1782, in Yorktown, York, Virginia, United States, at the age of 66, and was buried in Grace Episcopal Churchyard, Yorktown, York, Virginia, United States.

William Nelson's son, Thomas Nelson Jr. (1739–1789) (grandson of "Scotch Tom"), was a signer of the Declaration of Independence, a Brigadier General during the American Revolutionary War, when he was residing at Nelson House, and a governor after statehood. Nelson County, Virginia and Thomas Nelson Community College in the Virginia Peninsula subregion of Hampton Roads are among places named in honor of Thomas Nelson Jr.

Scotch Tom's great-grandson, Hugh Nelson (1768–1836), served in the U.S. Congress. Among his other notable descendants were U.S. diplomat and noted author Thomas Nelson Page (1853–1922) and industrialist William Nelson Page (1854–1932), who co-founded the Virginian Railway with financier Henry Huttleston Rogers. The chemist Dr. Donna J. Nelson is Scotch Tom's seventh great-granddaughter.

== Thomas Nelson House ==
The circa 1730 "Thomas Nelson House" was built by "Scotch Tom" Nelson in Yorktown, Virginia. His grandson Thomas Nelson Jr, a planter and politician, future governor of Virginia, was living there during the Revolutionary War.

Later the house was sold out of the Nelson family. In 1966 it was designated as a National Historical Landmark, recognized as important to colonial and US history. It was acquired in 1968 and restored in 1976 by the National Park Service to its 18th-century character. It is maintained as a contributing property of the Yorktown Battlefield, and part of the larger Colonial National Historical Park of the U.S. National Park Service.

The site of the Nelson House had originally been settled after the 1620s by immigrant Nicolas Martiau, another ancestor of Governor Thomas Nelson Jr. After being purchased in 1914 by Charles Blow and his wife, the grounds were designed by Charles F. Gillette in 1915.
