= Lord Botetourt (statues) =

Statues in Williamsburg, Virginia, US

- The 1993 bronze statue
- Artist: Richard Hayward (1772); Gordon Kray (1993)
- Year: 1772; 1993
- Medium: Marble (1772); bronze (1993)
- Movement: Baroque
- Subject: Norborne Berkeley, 4th Baron Botetourt
- Condition: Damaged (1772)
- Location: Earl Gregg Swem Library (1772); Old College Yard (1993), Williamsburg, Virginia
- Owner: College of William & Mary

Lord Botetourt is the name of two statues on the campus of the College of William & Mary in Williamsburg, Virginia, depicting colonial Virginia governor Norborne Berkeley, 4th Baron Botetourt. The first of these statues was executed in 1772 by English sculptor Richard Hayward and became the first sculpture in the Colony of Virginia, with the second statue being a 1993 bronze replica by Gordon Kray. The original is the oldest surviving public statue in North America. A Baroque sculpture cut from marble, it was ordered by the Virginia General Assembly in 1771 and installed in 1773 in the loggia of the Capitol in Williamsburg. The statue's plinth was one of the earliest major neoclassical works in British America. After a period of vandalism and neglect following the removal of Virginia's capital to Richmond, the statue was purchased by the College of William & Mary in 1801 and transferred to the College Yard on its campus.

During the 19th century, the statue suffered further damage due to vandalism and was briefly kept at Eastern State Hospital during the American Civil War. After being returned to the Old College Yard, the statue remained there until 1958, when it was moved to storage due to the damage it had sustained. In 1966, it was installed in a display inside the college's Earl Gregg Swem Library. The bronze replica by the sculptor Gordon Kray was installed on the site as part of the college's tercentenary celebrations in 1993. The statues, sometimes referred to as Lord Bot, are associated with several school traditions.

== Description ==
=== 1772 statue ===
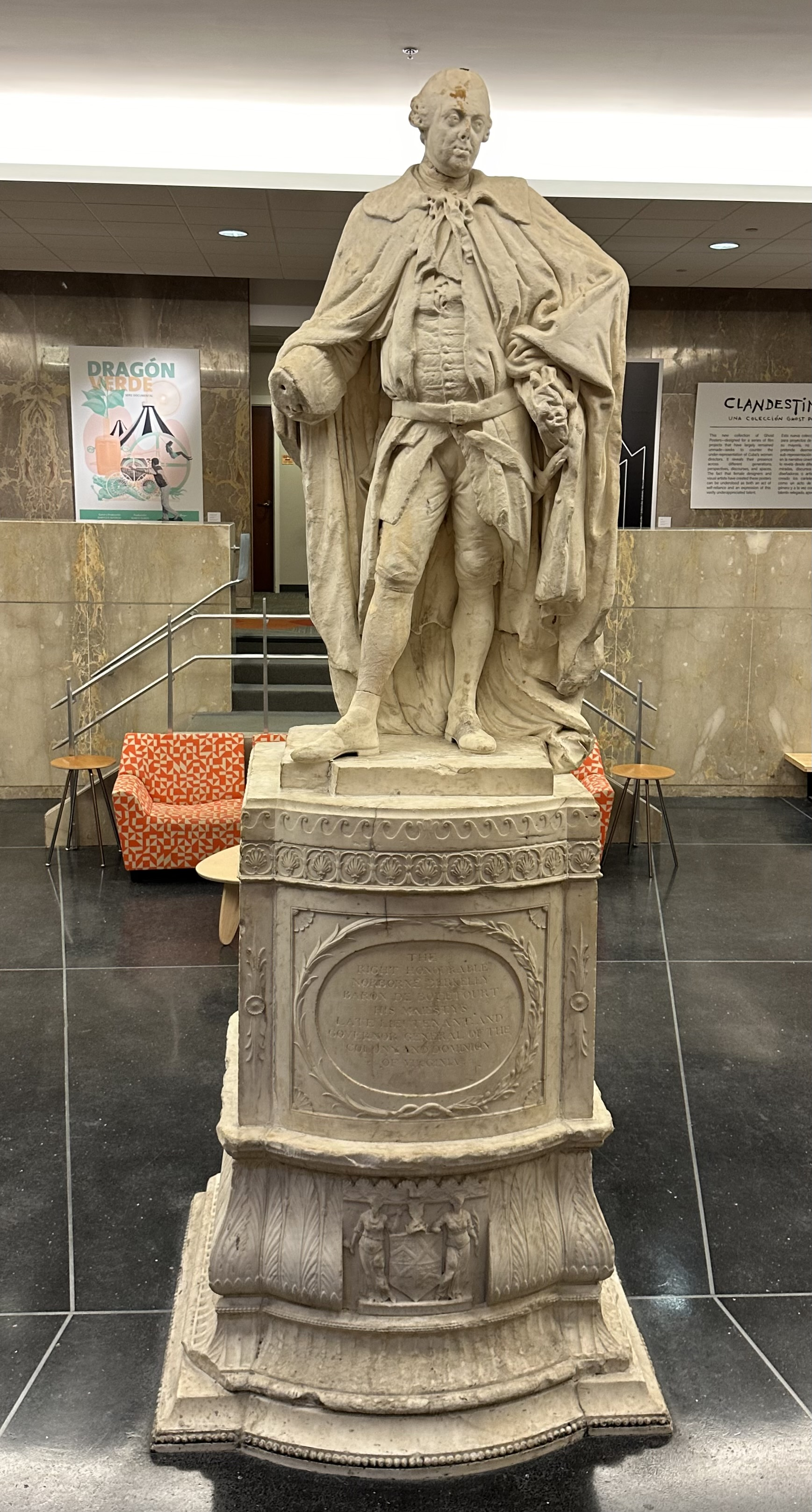
The original Lord Botetourt in its current installation within the Earl Gregg Swem Library of the College of William & Mary

The statue depicts Virginia governor Norborne Berkeley, 4th Baron Botetourt, known as Lord Botetourt, standing in contemporary court dress. The original marble figure is slightly more than life-sized. The design follows a medallion depicting Lord Botetourt created by sculptor Isaac Gosset. The original sculptor Richard Hayward had previously created a statue of Pitt the Elder, which was also a standing figure but portrayed the subject dressed in a toga, a reflection of Pitt's status as an orator. Hayward's posing of Lord Botetourt is reminiscent of a c. 1737 depiction of Hans Sloane in the Chelsea Physic Garden by Michael Rysback. The right hand, now missing, held a rolled parchment.

The first statue's plinth was one of the earliest major pieces of Neoclassicism in British America. Its height is 5 feet (1.5 m). The classical ornamentation is presented in a Baroque fashion with a trim of shell, wave, and feather designs. This ornamentation is Adamesque; Hayward had previously worked with the style's namesake, Robert Adam. Three sides feature inscriptions in all capital letters, including the front that also depicts the Berkeley arms, (Note: The front inscription is "The Right Honourable Norborne Berkeley Baron de Botetourt His Majesty's Late lieutenant; and Governor General of the Colony and Dominion of Virginia".) Facing the statue's front, the right side inscription addresses Lord Botetourt's "many public and Social Virtues which so eminently adorned his character". (Note: The right side inscription reads "Deeply impressed with the warmest sense of gratitude for His Excellence the Right Honble Lord Botetourt's prudent and wise administration, and that the Remembrance of those many public and Social virtues, which so eminently Adorned his illustrious character might Be transmitted to latest posterity, The General Assembly of Virginia On the XX day of July Ann. Dom. MDCCLXXI Resolved with one united voice to erect this statue to His Lordship's memory." The left side of the pedestal is inscribed "America, behold your friend who leaving his native country declined those additional honours which were there in store for him that he might heal your wounds and restore tranquility and happiness to this extensive continent; with what zeal and anxiety he pursured these glorious objects, Virginia, thus bears her gratefull testimony.")

The rear is a bas-relief of two women personifying Britannia and Virginia or America exchanging olive branches above the sacred flame of liberty on the altar of peace, which bears the word "Concordia". The personification is depicted as an Indian princess who possesses a bow and a quiver of arrows but lacks a feathered headdress, anticipating a neoclassical model of this personification that would appear several decades later.

The original installation in the Capitol, located between the building's wings in its loggia, was surrounded by an iron railing that had been shipped from England with the statue. The 1772 statue has sustained substantial damage since the late 1780s due to vandalism – including by students of the college – and the elements. The nose was lost, the head has fallen off several times, and its right hand is missing. It has been on display in the Earl Gregg Swem Library since 1966.

American Founding Father Edmund Randolph described the statue as "not more admired for its exquisite workmanship than for being a memorial of a statesman more than great, because truly honest". The art historian Wayne Craven found the sculpture's styling as within the Baroque tradition, commenting on its similarities to Hyacinthe Rigaud's "grandiose" portraits of Louis XIV. He also held that the statue demonstrated "Baroque grandeur" prior to the period of "effeminate Rococo refinement". The architectural historian Marcus Whiffen – noting the substantial damage to Lord Botetourt's likeness and his missing right hand – positively appraised the original statue in 1958, comparing it to the portraiture of the painter Joshua Reynolds. The formal stance is a mirror image of that of the King's in a portrait that hung in the Governor's Palace.

=== 1993 statue ===
Gordon Kray's 1993 cast bronze Lord Botetourt followed the design of Hayward's original. To replicate the original figure, casts were made. Due to damage on the original, particularly to the facial region and the missing hand, Kray said he utilized other portraits of Botetourt to "fill in the blanks" and reconstruct these elements in his Lord Botetourt. Bronze was chosen as the medium for the replica statue due to its greater resilience than marble, which Kray said might prevent further damage by students. From the base of the plinth to the top of the statue, it is 12 feet (3.7 m) tall.

== History ==
=== Creation ===
Norborne Berkeley, 4th Baron Botetourt, was the penultimate colonial governor of the British Colony of Virginia. Lord Botetourt arrived in Williamsburg to begin his term as governor on October 26, 1768, to a both optimistic and uncertain reception. His arrival coincided with a period of increased tension between the colonies and the British government. Botetourt proved amiable and, despite his pronounced loyalty to the Crown, was broadly popular even with aggrieved members of the House of Burgesses. In 1769, he became rector of the board of visitors of the College of William & Mary, where he often joined students for Morning and Evening Prayers in the chapel of the College Building (now the Wren Building). Botetourt became noted for his patronage of the liberal arts and religion. At the college, he endowed the competitively awarded gold Botetourt Medals, of which future U.S. president James Madison would be a recipient. Despite dissolving the House of Burgesses over their protests to Townshend Acts in 1769, he was still well respected in Williamsburg when he died of an illness on October 15, 1770. (Note: Despite his public displays of sympathy to the colonists' demands, Botetourt wrote privately to London that the government should not concede to them.)

An outpouring of public grief accompanied Botetourt's elaborate funeral procession, which began by transferring his body from the Governor's Palace to a memorial service at Bruton Parish Church before continuing to the college's chapel, where he was entombed. (Note: Private grief and commemoration of Botetourt persisted for some time. The politician Robert Carter Nicholas Sr. assisted several of his peers in acquiring miniature portraits of the late governor and named his youngest son after Botetourt. "Models of Lord Botetourt" and "Busts of the late Lord Botetourt" were advertised in the Virginia Gazette at least as late as May 1774. These models were likely plaster miniatures of Hayward's statue, though the advertisement of busts may indicate that these were profiles done in wax or a glassy material.) On July 20, 1771, the Virginia General Assembly voted nemine contradicente (without dissent) to acquire "an elegant statue in marble" to commemorate Lord Botetourt. (Note: The 1771 date that the General Assembly voted on the statue was given as July 11 by Whiffen. The General Assembly met from July 11 to July 20, with a July 20 letter from Thomas Everard to John Norton mentioning the vote. The Journals of the House of Burgesses of Virginia places the vote on July 20.) That such a memorial was approved was unusual, which was a fact noted by numerous letters to England and within the Virginia Gazette. Only once before had the Assembly considered a public statue, with a 1766 proposal to erect a sculpture for George III having quietly failed.

The Assembly approved a budget of 700 guineas for the acquisition of the statue, which was a substantial amount of money for the period. The Assembly also approved the use of public funds with no set limit to pay towards the statue. The appropriation authorized a six-man commission to seek an artist from outside the colony to create the statue, with acting governor William Nelson at its head. Nelson appointed House of Burgesses member John Norton, a London merchant who was represented in Virginia by his son at Yorktown, as their agent in England.

The commission's intent was communicated to Botetourt's nephew and executor, Henry Somerset, 5th Duke of Beaufort. The Duke informed the commission that he would aid Norton and advised them that there were no recent depictions of Botetourt but that a wax medallion bearing his likeness did exist. The medallion was by Isaac Gosset, who was known for his prolific wax portraits of notable English persons. In March 1772, Norton shared a drawing by Richard Hayward with the Duke, who approved it as the design of the statue. Hayward, like other contemporary English sculptors, primarily relied on contracts for church monuments. Norton informed his son in Yorktown in a March 10 letter that he had sent the commission several drawings – including several options for the plinth's design – and four Gosset medallions of Botetourt. According to the letter, Hayward could complete the statue in a year and have the statue shipped to Virginia with iron rails for £700. The politician Robert Carter Nicholas wrote to Norton that the commission approved of the designs but opposed including the word "Peace" in the inscription; Carter did not specify the basis for this opposition.

Norton wrote to his son in August 1772 to report that the statue was "in forwardness" and that a marble block had been selected. He wrote another letter in March 1773 that the statue was completed and had attracted positive attention in England before being sent to the Americas aboard the ship Virginia. Before it was placed in the Capitol, the statue was admired by those in Williamsburg, though Nicholas lamented that "the likeness [was] not so striking as of the [m]edallion". The statue was accompanied by a mason named John Hirst, who received a similarly positive reception. Hirst erected the statue in the Capitol's piazza by early June 1773 for £50.

=== In the Capitol ===
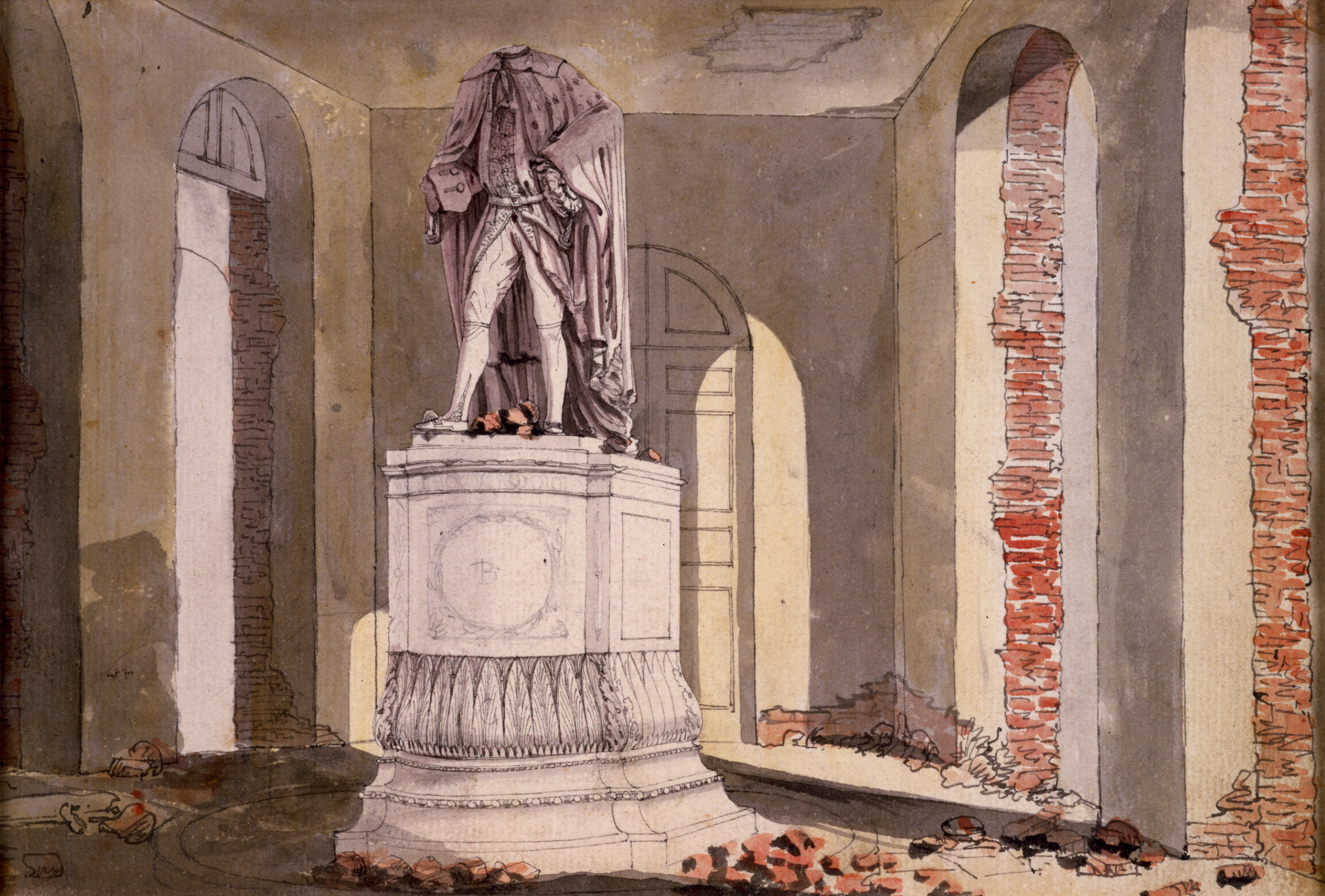
Benjamin Henry Latrobe's 1796 painting of the Lord Botetourt statue with the crumbling Capitol around it

Hayward's Lord Botetourt was the first piece of sculpture in colonial Virginia. It was the second piece of pre-American Revolution sculpture to arrive in the southern colonies, after a replica of Wilton's Pitt arrived in Charleston, South Carolina, in 1770. Wilton's equestrian gilded lead George III and the original Pitt, both installed in New York City in 1770, were the first and second statues in the North American colonies. Of the four full-length statues erected in North America during the British colonial period, only Hayward's Lord Botetourt survives. (Note: A wooden figure from Boston called The Little Admiral dates to c. 1750. Standing at 42 inches (110 cm) tall, it is the oldest surviving piece of colonial British North American sculpture work.) It is the oldest surviving public statue in North America.

Through the late 18th century, Lord Botetourt became a regular subject of commentary in travelers' accounts. The traveling Scottish architect William Mylne observed the statue in 1775 and wrote in a letter that he was unfamiliar with statues done with subjects dressed in attire other than that of the ancient Greeks or Romans. He also noted that the plinth was enclosed by an iron railing. Despite the onset of the American Revolutionary War between the colonists and the British, the statue was cleaned every year at the opening of each General Assembly through 1779. In 1780, the capital of Virginia was moved from Williamsburg to Richmond. It was recorded as having remained in good condition through at least 1786.

Soon after the capital was moved, the Williamsburg Capitol building began to have elements removed by Patriot troops. By 1793, the General Assembly voted to dismantle the Capitol's east wing, though this was not completed immediately. (Note: Politician John Randolph of Roanoke spoke of learning at a grammar school that had moved into the decaying Capitol and walking around the statue.) The statue was vandalized and damaged by the weather. A 1796 watercolor and pen painting by the Anglo-American artist Benjamin Henry Latrobe showed the statue and surrounding Capitol in a state of disrepair. (Note: Latrobe's commentary on the structure shows that the east wing survived up to this point.) The Anglo-Irish writer Isaac Weld, writing about the statue in 1798, said that he believed the damage had occurred during the Revolutionary War in an act of anti-monarchial vandalism.

In 1796, a statue of George Washington by the French sculptor Jean-Antoine Houdon was installed in the Virginia State Capitol at Richmond. This statue likely replaced Lord Botetourt as a subject of Virginian's appreciation. According to the historian Graham Hood, Houdon's statue was "another extremely rare full-length marble figure, a truly great work of art".

=== On the campus ===
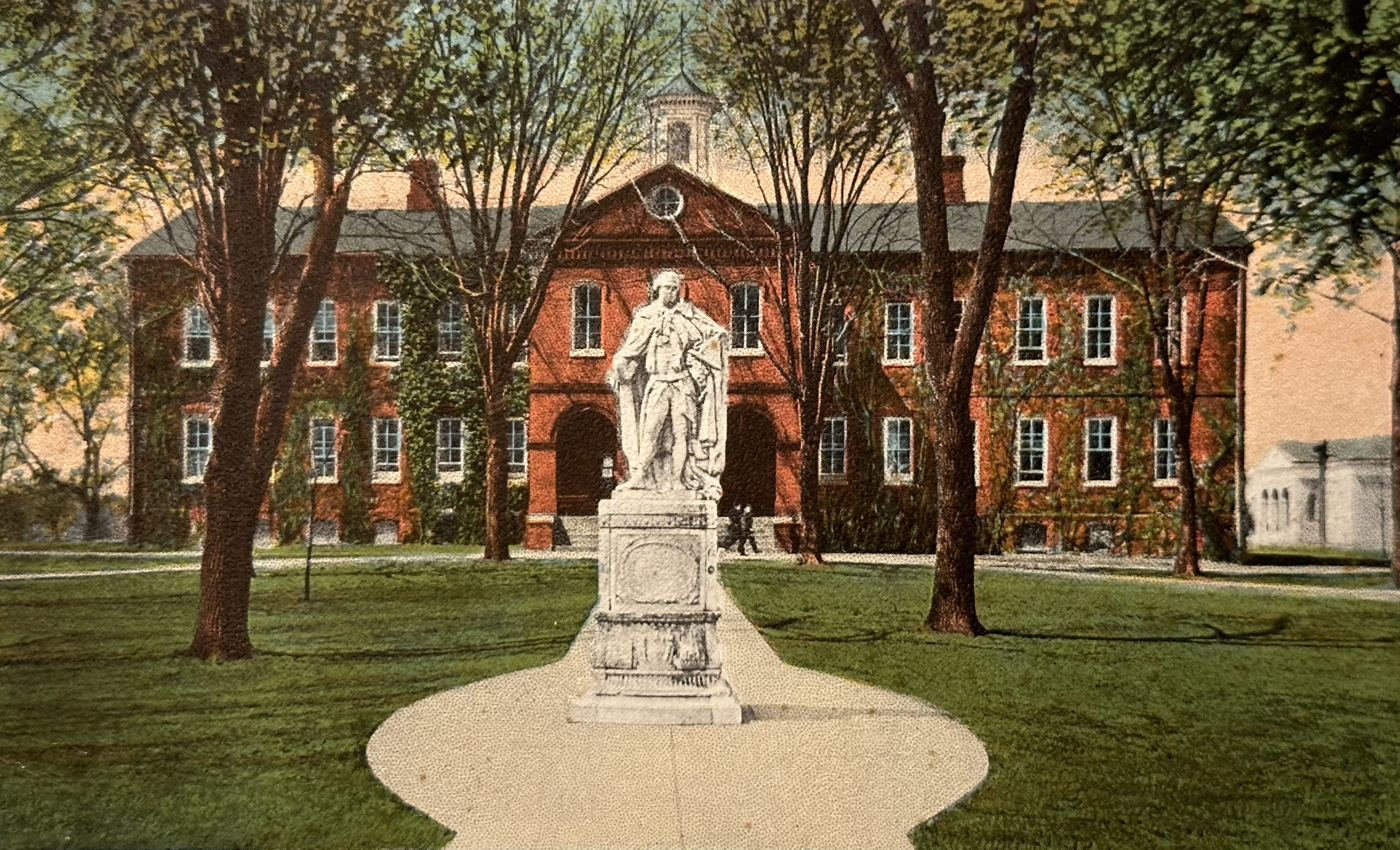
The 1772 statue in the Old College Yard during the early 20th century, with the College Building (now known as the Wren Building) behind it

Lord Botetourt was purchased by a group College of William & Mary faculty in 1801 for $100 (equivalent to $1,935 in 2025). After the decapitated statue's head was struck with an iron plug by college president and bishop James Madison and a Mr. Moody, the repaired statue was erected on the college's campus in the Old College Yard in front of the College Building (now called the Wren Building). It would remain there through the mid-20th century with one interruption.

The statue was on the campus at the outset of the American Civil War, where it survived an 1863 skirmish on the campus but was moved to Eastern State Hospital in 1864 to preserve it from harm. It was displayed in front of the hospital until being returned to its spot in the Old College Yard in 1874. Back on the campus, the statue was occasionally subject to students pouring paint over it. A 1938 editorial in the student newspaper The Flat Hat sought to dissuade students from this practice, noting the statue's historical and monetary value, as well as the porous nature of its marble which made cleaning difficult. It was moved to storage in 1958 due to damage before being placed on display in Swem Library in 1966.

A bronze statue by the sculptor and college alumnus Gordon Kray based on the 1772 Lord Botetourt was installed on the former campus site of the original during the college's tercentenary celebrations in 1993. Kray began work on his Lord Botetourt in October 1992, with most of the work completed during 1993. Since he was not able to have the fragile original moved, casts were taken where it is displayed in the library. Lost portions of the statue, including the hand missing since the 18th century, had to be recreated. Bronze was chosen as the medium for the 1993 statue for its sturdiness. Kray said "the original really took some abuse. College kids are college kids. They don't change much in 200 years." The 1993 statue, funded by private donations, cost about $155,000 (equivalent to $345,456 in 2025).

The 1772 statue remains on display in the library's basement in what is known as the Botetourt Gallery, with the 1993 statue in the Old College Yard. The Colonial Williamsburg Foundation utilized three-dimensional scans from both of the Lord Botetourt statues and fragments from the original plinth in constructing a digital version of the now-lost Capitol building. The Lord Botetourt statues are among the pieces of art located across the campus, with several others dating to the tercentenary celebrations. These include a statue of William & Mary alumnus Thomas Jefferson – gifted by the University of Virginia – and a statue of the college's first president, James Blair. Other statues by Kray are also on the campus: a depiction of James Monroe in front of Tucker Hall, a statue of George Wythe and John Marshall in front of the William & Mary Law School, and a statue of Pierre Charles L'Enfant in Alan B. Miller Hall.

The statue and Lord Botetourt have both been held in high esteem by the college's students into the 21st century, possibly as a result of the statue's perpetuity or an inside joke. The statue is sometimes referred to as "Lord Bot" or "Lord B". A campus tradition extant from the 1920s to the 1970s maintained that freshmen had to salute or perform a bow or curtsey when passing the statue. Several ongoing traditions exist around the statue in the Old College Yard, including decorating the statue with wreaths during Yuletide and balloons for other festivities. The practice of rubbing one of the statue's feet has resulted in the oils from people's hands turning the foot shiny. A Twitter account speaking in the statue's voice also garnered popularity with students in the 2010s.
