= Thomas Nelson Jr. =

American Founding Father and politician

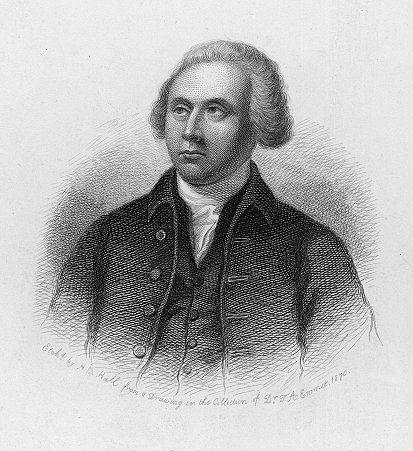
- Engraving by Henry Bryan Hall

4th Governor of Virginia
- In office June 12, 1781 – November 22, 1781
- Preceded by: William Fleming (acting)
- Succeeded by: Benjamin Harrison V

Delegate from Virginia to the Second Continental Congress
- In office 1779–1780 Serving with William Fitzhugh, Thomas Adams, Cyrus Griffin, John Harvie, Arthur Lee, Francis Lightfoot Lee, Richard Henry Lee, James Mercer, Edmund Jennings Randolph, Meriwether Smith
- Preceded by: John Banister
- Succeeded by: James Henry
- In office 1775–1777 Serving with Carter Braxton, Thomas Jefferson, Francis Lightfoot Lee, Richard Henry Lee, George Washington, George Wythe
- Preceded by: Patrick Henry
- Succeeded by: John Banister

Member of the Virginia House of Delegates from York County
- In office October 16, 1786 – June 22, 1788 Serving with Joseph Prentis
- Preceded by: Nathaniel Nelson
- Succeeded by: William Nelson
- In office May 1782 – May 2, 1784 Serving with Joseph Prentis
- Preceded by: unclear
- Succeeded by: Nathaniel Nelson
- In office May 5, 1777 – June 1781 Serving with Joseph Prentis, William Reynolds
- Preceded by: William Digges
- Succeeded by: unclear

Member of the Virginia House of Burgesses from York County
- In office 1761–1775 Serving with Dudley Digges
- Preceded by: Robert Carter Nicholas
- Succeeded by: position abolished

Personal details
- Born: December 26, 1738 Yorktown, Colony of Virginia, British America
- Died: January 4, 1789 (aged 50) Hanover County, Virginia, U.S.
- Resting place: Grace Episcopal Churchyard, Yorktown
- Spouse: Lucy Grymes
- Relations: Thomas "Scotch Tom" Nelson (grandfather); Robert Carter I (great-grandfather); George Reade (great-great-grandfather); Nicolas Martiau (third great-grandfather); George Washington (third cousin); William Henry Harrison (third cousin); Benjamin Harrison (third cousin twice removed)
- Children: 5, including Hugh Nelson
- Parent(s): William Nelson; Elizabeth Burwell
- Education: University of Cambridge
- Profession: Planter, soldier, statesman

Thomas Nelson Jr. (December 26, 1738 – January 4, 1789) was a Founding Father of the United States, general in the Revolutionary War, member of the Continental Congress, and a Virginia planter. In addition to serving many terms in the Virginia General Assembly, he twice represented Virginia in the Congress, where he signed the Declaration of Independence in 1776. Fellow Virginia legislators elected him to serve as the commonwealth's governor in 1781, the same year he fought as a brigadier general in the siege of Yorktown, the final major battle of the war.

== Early and family life ==
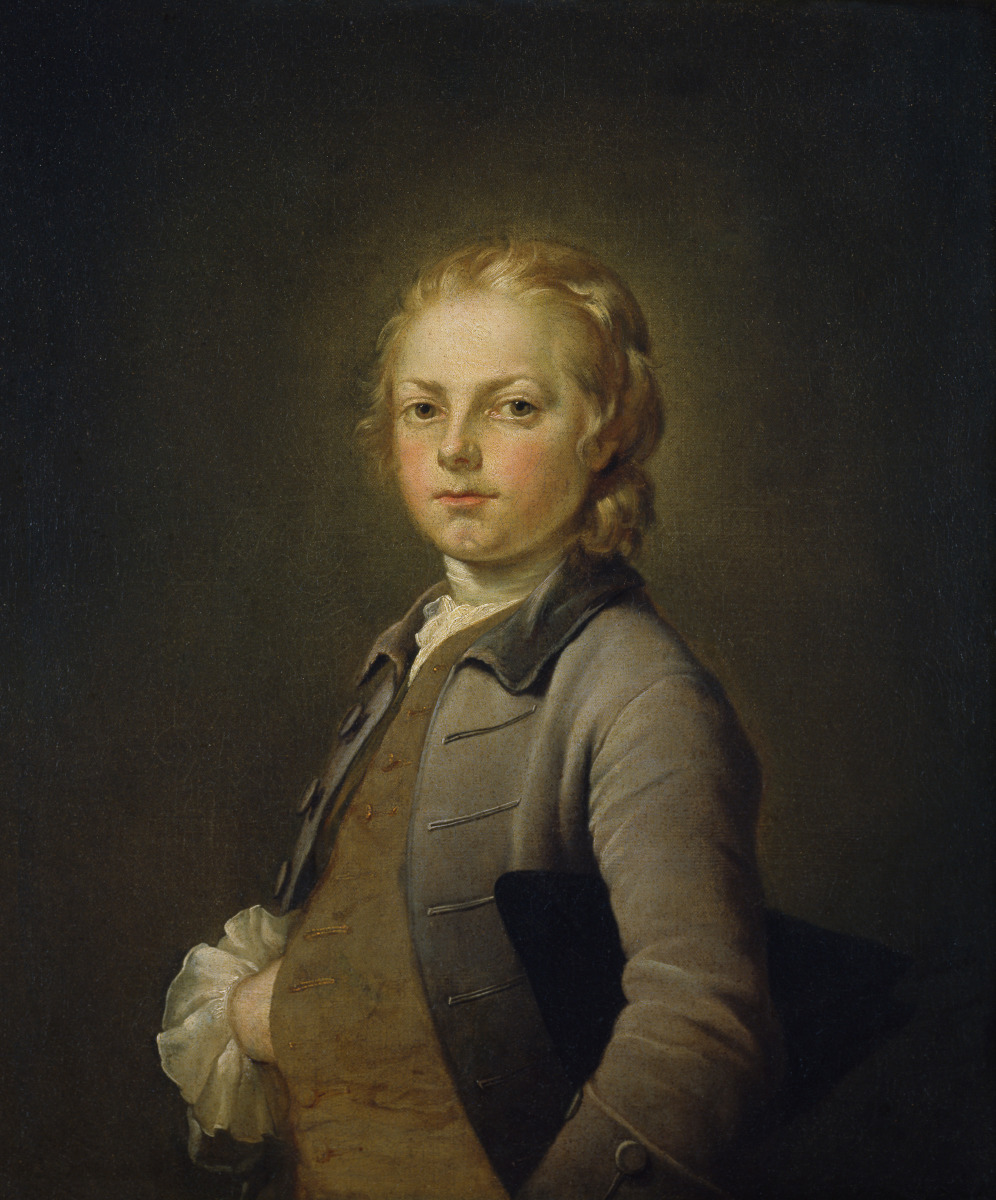
Nelson in 1750

Nelson was the grandson of Thomas "Scotch Tom" Nelson, an immigrant son of a cloth merchant from Penrith in Cumberland, England, who after three voyages to the Virginia colony settled at and developed Yorktown, where the York River drained into Mobjack Bay. During the following three decades, Scotch Tom not only increased his wealth, but parlayed it into influence so that his children (and grandchildren) married into the First Families of Virginia. Complicating matters, each generation would have at least one boy named to honor the immigrant father, who had accumulated over 6500 acres of land (including choice lots in Yorktown and Williamsburg) by the time of this boy's birth.

This boy was born at Yorktown in 1738, the firstborn child of Scotch Tom's firstborn son, William Nelson, who assisted and expanded the family's mercantile business and became a prominent colonial leader, even becoming the President of the Governor's Council (the highest office to which a Virginia born man could aspire) and briefly served as the colony's interim governor. His mother was Elizabeth Carter Burwell (daughter of Robert "King" Carter, the wealthiest man in Virginia in that era), the sister of Lewis Burwell who became President of the Virginia Governor's Council, and widow of burgess Nathaniel Burwell. Complicating matters, his father's younger brother was also named Thomas Nelson (1716-1782), and he was prominent as the Virginia colony's deputy secretary as well as for his service on the Virginia Governor's Council (on which he served with his brother for decades, then succeeded as that body's last president) and operation of plantations. That man's sons (another William, Thomas and Wilson Cary Nelson) moved to Hanover County (where this man would die years later) as well as several other areas including Caroline, Prince William and Mecklenburg Counties and some of that Thomas' descendants married Nelson cousins. [Custom of the colonial/independence time could use "Jr" to designate a younger relative of an important individual, hence the "Jr." here.] Through his paternal great-great-grandfather, George Reade, Nelson was a third cousin of first U.S. President and fellow Founding Father George Washington, though it is unknown if either of them knew they were related.

Like many Virginians of the highest level of the planter class, Nelson was sent to England for his education. He attended Newcome's School before entering Christ's College, Cambridge, in 1758. He graduated in 1760 and returned to Virginia the following year. Nelson was an ancestor of Thomas Nelson Page and William Nelson Page.

== Planter ==
Upon returning to Virginia, Nelson assisted his father in the operation of his several plantations, which depended on the labor of enslaved African Americans. He married Lucy Grymes (b. 1743), daughter of Philip Ludwell Grymes of Brandon in Middlesex, Virginia. Her aunt of the same name (b.1720) was the widow of Carter Burwell of Carter's Grove plantation and mother to Nathaniel Burwell.

During the American Revolutionary War, Nelson bought 5,400 acres of land and 400 enslaved people in Prince William County from financially strapped Lewis Burwell (who died in 1779).

== Political career ==
York County voters elected Nelson to the Virginia House of Burgesses as a young man in 1761; he succeeded Robert Carter Nicholas in this part-time position. He served his first six terms alongside veteran delegate Dudley Digges.

As Virginians became dissatisfied with colonial governance, Digges and Nelson were elected to represent York County during the five Virginia conventions that preceded statehood: the First Virginia Convention (which met in Williamsburg in 1774), the Second Virginia Convention (which met at St. John's Church in Richmond in March 1775), the Third Virginia Convention (which met in Richmond in the summer of 1775), the Fourth Virginia Convention (which met in the winter of 1775–1776 in Richmond and Williamsburg, which Nelson was unable to attend), and the Fifth Virginia Convention, which met in Williamsburg in the summer of 1776 (Nelson left this convention in May to attend the Continental Congress).

William Digges (who had represented York County during the last Virginia Revolutionary Convention) also represented York County alongside Corbin Griffin at the first non-colonial session of the Virginia House of Delegates in the fall of 1776. But Nelson won the 1777 and 1778 elections to represent York County in the House of Delegates, where he served alongside Joseph Prentis. Prentis relinquished his seat in 1778 to serve on the Council of State and was replaced by Nelson on September 21, 1778. In 1779, 1780, and 1781, Nelson served alongside William Reynolds and relinquished his legislative seat upon being elected governor of Virginia in June 1781.

Nelson's first term in Congress continued until 1776 when a bout of illness forced his resignation for the 1778–1779 term. After his recovery, he was again elected and served another year. During his first stint as a member of Congress, Nelson also returned to Virginia to play a key role in its Constitutional Convention in the spring of 1776. He returned to Congress to sign the Declaration of Independence that summer.

Thomas Nelson was one of the thirteen committee members appointed in the Continental Congress on June 12, 1776, to "prepare and digest the form of confederation" they drafted the Articles of Confederation.

He was a brigadier general of the Lower Virginia Militia and succeeded Thomas Jefferson as governor of Virginia (after William Fleming's nine days as acting governor). Nelson was engaged in the final siege of Yorktown.

According to legend, he urged General George Washington (or, in some versions, Marquis de Lafayette) to fire on his own home, the Nelson House, where General Cornwallis had his headquarters, offering five guineas to the first man to hit his house.

== Postwar years ==
Following his term as Virginia's governor, Nelson again won election to the Virginia House of Delegates. He represented York County alongside Joseph Prentis in the assemblies of 1782 and 1783 but was replaced by Nathaniel Nelson in the assembly of 1784–1785. He and Prentis won the next election and again served in the sessions of 1786–1787 and 1787–1788. Robert Shield and William Nelson replaced them in the assembly of 1788.

However, his landholdings near Yorktown were damaged severely during the conflict, and he had significant debts, and so would be hounded by creditors. In one attempt to recoup his finances, Nelson sold 120 slaves in Prince William County.

== Death and legacy ==
Coat of Arms of Thomas Nelson Jr.

Nelson died at his son's home in Hanover County, Virginia, nine days after his fiftieth birthday. His remains were returned to Yorktown, and buried in the family plot at Grace Church where he had been a vestry member. For decades, his descendants sought compensation from the U.S. Congress and the Virginia General Assembly.

Colonel Innes made this tribute:

The illustrious General Thomas Nelson is no more! He paid the last great debt to nature, on Sunday, the fourth of the present month, at his estate in Hanover. He who undertakes barely to recite the exalted virtues which adorned the life of this great and good man, will unavoidably pronounce a panegyric on human nature. As a man, a citizen, a legislator, and a patriot, he exhibited a conduct untarnished and undebased by sordid or selfish interest, and strongly marked with the genuine characteristics of true religion, sound benevolence, and liberal policy. Entertaining the most ardent love for civil and religious liberty, he was among the first of that glorious band of patriots whose exertions dashed and defeated the machinations of British tyranny, and gave United America freedom and independent empire. At a most important crisis, during the late struggle for American liberty, when this state appeared to be designated as the theatre of action for the contending armies, he was selected by the unanimous suffrage of the legislature to command the virtuous yeomanry of his country; in this honourable employment he remained until the end of the war; as a soldier, he was indefatigably active and coolly intrepid; resolute and undejected in misfortunes, he towered above distress, and struggled with the manifold difficulties to which his situation exposed him, with constancy and courage. In the memorable year 1781, when the whole force of the southern British army was directed to the immediate subjugation of this state, he was called to the helm of government; this was a juncture which indeed 'tried men's souls.' He did not avail himself of this opportunity to retire in the rear of danger; but on the contrary, took the field at the head of his countrymen; and at the hazard of his life, his fame, and individual fortune, by his decision and magnanimity, he saved not only his country, but all America, from disgrace, if not from total ruin. Of this truly patriotic and heroic conduct, the renowned commander in chief, with all the gallant officers of the combined armies employed at the siege of York, will bear ample testimony; this part of his conduct even contemporary jealousy, envy, and malignity were forced to approve, and this, more impartial posterity, if it can believe, will almost adore. If, after contemplating the splendid and heroic parts of his character, we shall inquire for the milder virtues of humanity, and seek for the man, we shall find the refined, beneficent, and social qualities of private life, through all its forms and combinations, so happily modified and united in him, that in the words of the darling poet of nature, it may be said: His life was gentle: and the elements so mixed in him, that nature might stand up And say to all the world—this was a man.

== Legacy and honors ==
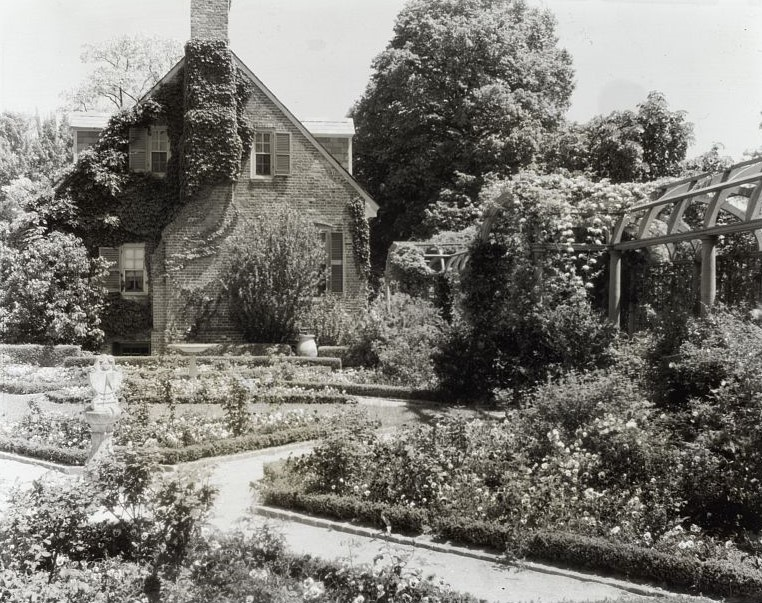
"York Hall," Captain George Preston Blow House, 1914, the home of Thomas Nelson Jr., 1738–1739.

- Nelson County, Virginia, and Nelson County, Kentucky, were named in his honor.
- The Virginia State Council for Higher Education named Thomas Nelson Community College in Thomas Nelson Jr's honor in 1967. The college was renamed in 2022, removing his name altogether.
- The Thomas Nelson High School was opened in 2012 in Nelson County, Kentucky.
- The circa 1730 Nelson House built by "Scotch Tom" Nelson in Yorktown, Virginia, was occupied by Thomas Nelson Jr. during the Revolutionary War. It was designated as a National Historical Landmark. It is maintained as part of the Colonial National Historical Park by the U.S. National Park Service.

== See also ==
- Memorial to the 56 Signers of the Declaration of Independence

== Notes ==
Political offices
| Preceded by William Fleming | Governor of Virginia; 1781 | Succeeded by Benjamin Harrison V |
