= George Reade (colonial governor) =

Colonial governor of Virginia (1608–1671)

Acting Governor of Virginia Colony
- In office 1638–1639
- Monarch: Charles I
- Preceded by: John Harvey
- Succeeded by: Francis Wyatt

Member of the Virginia Governor's Council
- In office 1658-1671

Member of the House of Burgesses representing York County, Virginia
- In office 1656–1657 Serving with Joseph Croshaw, Ralph Langley, John Page, Armiger Wade, Francis WIllis
- Preceded by: Robert Booth
- Succeeded by: Robert Borne

Member of the House of Burgesses representing James City County, Virginia
- In office 1649–1651 Serving with William Barret, Walter Chiles, John Dunston, Thomas Swan, William Whittaker
- Preceded by: Bridges Freeman
- Succeeded by: John Fludd

Personal details
- Born: October 25, 1608 Linkenholt, Hampshire, England
- Died: November 21, 1671 (aged 63) Yorktown, Virginia, British America
- Resting place: Grace Church
- Spouse: Elizabeth Martiau (m. 1641)
- Relations: George Washington (great-great grandson); Thomas Nelson Jr. (great-great grandson)
- Children: 7

Military service
- Branch/service: Virginia Militia
- Rank: Colonel

George Reade (October 25, 1608 – November 21, 1671) was a prominent landowner, military officer and politician who served as a member of the House of Burgesses and as Acting Governor of Virginia Colony. He is the great-great-grandfather of the first President of the United States, George Washington.

== Early life and family ==
Coat of Arms of George Reade

Reade was born on October 25, 1608, in Linkenholt, Hampshire, England, the son of Robert Reade and Mildred Windebank Reade. He descended from Magna Charta Sureties. His paternal grandparents were Andrew Reade and Alice Cooke, and his maternal grandparents were Frances Dymoke and Sir Thomas Windebank. His uncle was Sir Francis Windebank, Secretary of State to King Charles I.

== Career ==
After his mother died, Reade traveled to Virginia in January 1637, the 28 year old accompanied the colony's restored (but unpopular) governor John Harvey. Reade assisted and advised Harvey, worked closely with the colony's Secretary, Richard Kemp, and for a time resided at the governor's mansion. From 1638 to 1639, during Harvey's absence, Reade served as Acting Governor of Virginia, until Sir Francis Wyatt (royally appointed as Harvey's successor) arrived in the colony. Reade was later appointed as the colony's Secretary, when Kemp traveled to England (1640-1642). Reade also served as clerk of the Virginia Governor's Council.

The colony's initial capital, Jamestown, was notoriously unhealthy during summers, so Reade settled not far away, first in Williamsburg (which later became the colony's capital, and was built across the border line which divided James City and York Counties). He later resided at plantations in York and Gloucester County (which developed across the York River during this tobacco boom era).

Reade acquired considerable land holdings throughout Virginia colony. He also invested in land that became the Northern Neck of Virginia, often receiving headrights for paying the travel expenses of indentured servants, and then patenting land with the promise to develop it. Reade patented 600 acres of land in Lancaster County in 1651, 500 acres in Northumberland County in 1653, 2,000 acres in Westmoreland County in 1657, and in 1667 the General Assembly granted him 2,000 acres of land along the Piankatank River in Gloucester County.

As was required of all white men, Reade served in the Virginia Militia. By the late 1630s he was rising in the officer ranks, receiving promotions from Captain to Major and finally as Colonel.

=== Virginia political career ===
By 1649, James City County voters elected Reade as one of their representatives in the House of Burgesses, which governed the colony, and in 1656 he was one of the many burgesses representing York County. Reade served as a member of the Virginia Governor's Council from around 1658 until his death. The Governor's Council could also act as the colony's highest court in that era. On August 25, 1656, Reade was a justice of the General Court of Virginia, sitting for York County.

=== Marriage and children ===
In 1641, Reade married Elizabeth Martiau, one of three daughters of burgess Nicolas Martiau and first wife Jane Berkeley. They probably wed in York County, Virginia. They had seven children, including:

- Mildred Reade (1643–1694), married Augustine Warner Jr.
- Robert Reade (1644–1722/23), married Mary Lilly
- George Reade Jr. (born c. 1648) died without issue before his mother
- Francis Reade (1650–1694), married Jane Chisman
- Elizabeth Reade (1654–1717), married Capt. Thomas Cheesman
- Benjamin Reade (born c. 1667), married Mary Gwynn
- Thomas Reade (1669-1734), married Lucy Gwynn

== Death and legacy ==
Reade died in 1671 at the age of 63. He bequeathed 850 acres of land in York County to his firstborn sons George and Robert, subject to a life estate in his widow. She survived him by more than a decade, with her will written in the winter of 1685/6 being admitted to probate the following winter. It divided the land of her childless and by then deceased son George among his younger brothers Francis and Benjamin. Reade is buried at the Grace Episcopal Churchyard in Yorktown. His granddaughter Margaret (Robert Reade's daughter) married William Nelson who likewise served briefly as a burgess, but many years on the Governor's Council and briefly as acting governor.

== Notable descendants ==
- George Washington (1732–1799) – General of the American Revolutionary War, first American President; 2nd great-grandson through daughter Mildred Washington, née Warner
- Thomas Nelson Jr. (1738–1789) – Brigadier General, Signer of the Declaration of Independence, Governor of Virginia; 2nd great-grandson through granddaughter Margaret Nelson, née Reade
- Meriwether Lewis (1774–1809) – American explorer, Governor of Louisiana Territory; 3rd great-grandson through granddaughter Elizabeth Lewis, née Warner
- George S. Patton (1885–1945) – General of the United States Army during World War II; 7th and 8th great-grandson
- Queen Elizabeth II (1926–2022) – Queen of the United Kingdom; 9th great-granddaughter through daughter Mary Smith, née Warner

== See also ==
- Colony of Virginia
- Virginia History
- List of colonial governors of Virginia
