= Richard Hayward (sculptor) =

British sculptor

- Born: 1725; Weston-in-Arden, Bulkington, England
- Died: 11 August 1800 (aged 74–75); London, England
- Known for: Sculpture
- Notable work: Lord Botetourt (1772–1773)

Richard Hayward (1725–1800) was an 18th-century British sculptor. He has several works in Westminster Abbey.

== Life ==
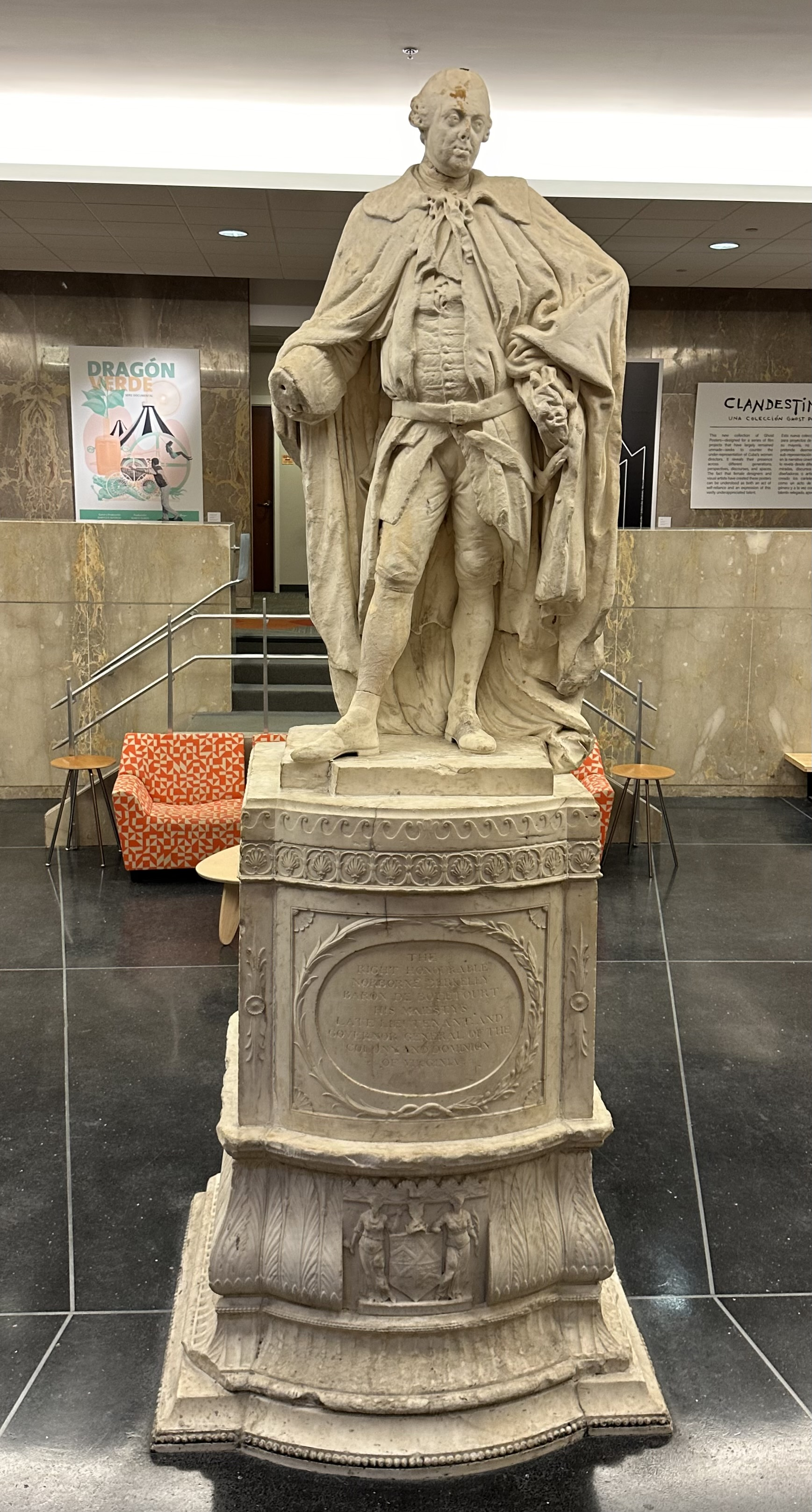
Statue of Lord Botetourt by Hayward (in its current installation within the Earl Gregg Swem Library of the College of William & Mary)

He was born at Weston-in-Arden in Bulkington. He was christened on 13 May 1725 the son of Richard and Mary Hayward.

He was apprenticed to Christopher Horsnaile the Younger in London from 1740 and lived in his house in Holborn, London. He moved to the studio of Henry Cheere in 1742 and served a 7-year apprenticeship with him. However, he seems to have still lived with the Horsnailes and is thought to have married one of the daughters as he is said to be related by marriage. He was made a Freeman of the Company of Master Masons in 1749. His interest in sculpture seems to have been wholly artistic as he seemed a gentleman of independent means, in no need of a trade.

Until 1749 he lived in Weston Hall on the Arden estate in Bulkington, he then rented the hall to his old master Christopher Horsnaile while he travelled Europe on a Grand Tour. In these times it was fashionable for gentleman to do a Grand Tour when they reached 21 years of age. On his tour he befriended Charles Jennens and Thomas Jenkins both of whom seem to have been familiar with Hayward's sculptural work and admired him.

In 1753 he spent a year in Rome. He returned to England around 1755 and set up a sculpture studio in Piccadilly in central London. He exhibited at the Society of Arts from 1761 to 1766. Charles Jennens was a major patron of his work.

He obtained commissions in important buildings such as Woburn Abbey and Blenheim Palace.

In 1798, he presented Bulkington Parish Church with a carved font which he had carved from Numidian marble brought back as a huge Roman column from his Grand Tour.

He died on 11 August 1800 at his house in Half Moon Street in London. Half Moon Street, in the Piccadilly district, connects to Buckingham Palace via a straight path across Green Park.

He is buried in Bulkington Church.

== Known works ==
- Fireplaces of Kedleston Hall (1760) under Robert Adam
- Statuary at Charles Jennens London house on Great Ormond Street (1761)
- Ornamentation of the Ionic Temple in the grounds of Gopsall Park (1764) for Charles Jennens
- Fireplaces at Woburn Abbey (1771) under Henry Holland
- Ornamentation of Ingress Abbey in Kent (1771) for John Calcraft MP
- Design for fountains at Blenheim Palace (1772-1774) for the Duke of Marlborough (reusing the Bernini fountains)
- Lord Botetourt, a statue in Williamsburg, Virginia (1773) the oldest statue in the USA
- Fireplaces of Somerset House in London (1778-1785) under William Chambers
- Font at Bulkington Parish Church (pre 1798)

== Memorials ==
- Memorial to Harriet Whitbread, wife of the brewer Samuel Whibtread (1769) in Cardington Parish Church
- Memorial to Rev Slaughter Clarke and his wife (1772) in Theddingworth Parish Church
- Memorial to Charles Jennens (1775) at Nether Whitacre Parish Church
- Grave of Lady Newdigate (1776) in Harefield Parish Church
- Memorial to John Roberts (1776) in Westminster Abbey
- Lt Gen William Strode (1776) in Westminster Abbey
- Memorial to General Oughton (1780) in Westminster Abbey
- Memorial to Mary Miles (1781) in Nackington Church
- Memorial to his parents (1781) in Bulkington Parish Church
- Memorial to John Hamilton MP (1781) in Chester Cathedral
- Memorial to George Ogden (1788) in Chester Cathedral
