= Benjamin Bathurst (1711–1767) =

Benjamin Bathurst (1711–1767) was the member of Parliament for the constituency of Cirencester for the parliament of 1754.

He was commissioned an ensign in the 2nd Regiment of Foot Guards on 28 November 1728. He resigned from the Army in March 1730/1.
