= Thomas Nelson House (Yorktown, Virginia) =

- U.S. National Register of Historic Places
- U.S. National Historic Landmark
- U.S. Historic district – Contributing property
- Virginia Landmarks Register
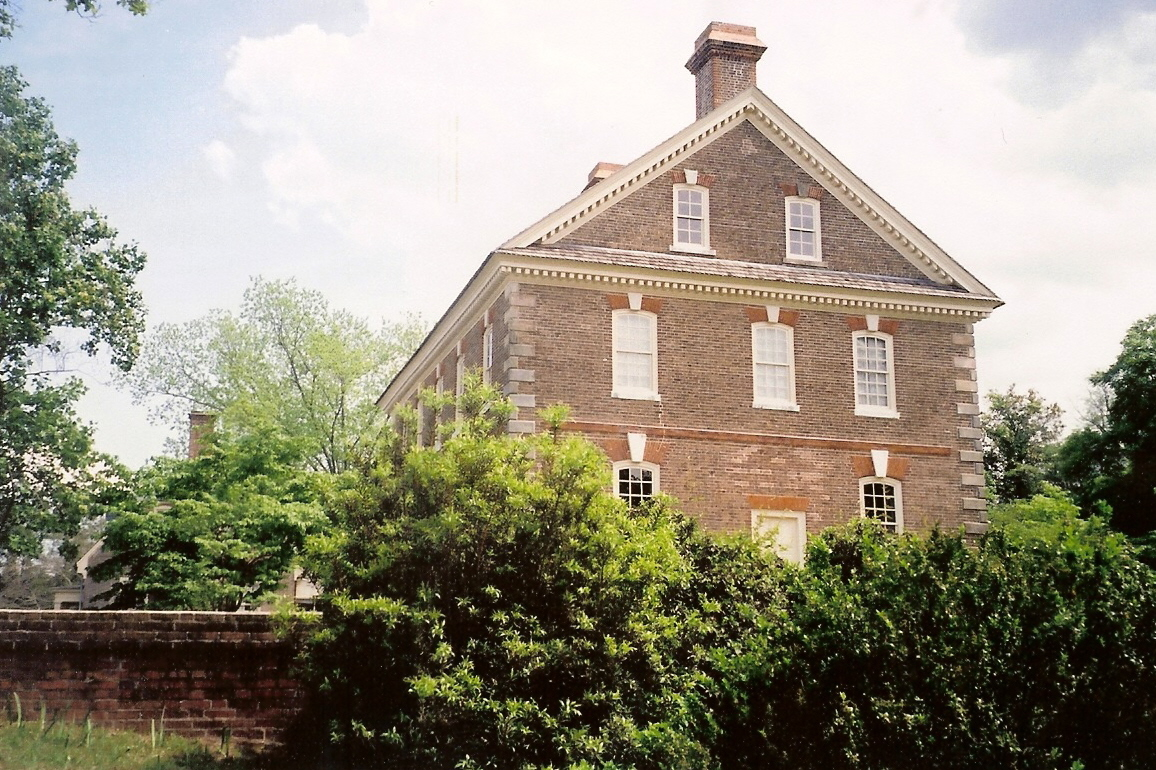

- Location within Virginia Location within the United States
- Nearest city: Jamestown, Virginia
- Coordinates: 37°14′3.84″N 76°30′25.68″W
- Built: 1730
- Built by: Thomas "Scotch Tom" Nelson
- Architectural style: Georgian
- NRHP reference No.: 66000839
- VLR No.: 047-0002

Significant dates
- Added to NRHP: October 15, 1966
- Designated VLR: See individual properties

York Hall, also called Thomas Nelson House, and Captain George Preston Blow House, is an historic Colonial home in Yorktown, Virginia. It was built around 1730 and held by generations of the Nelson family through the Revolutionary War. After years in private ownership, it was designated as a National Historic Landmark and added to the National Register of Historic Places in 1966.

It was acquired by the National Park Service in 1968 and restored in 1976 to its 18th-century character. It is also a contributing property to Colonial National Historical Park in Yorktown and among the battlefield attractions.

== History ==
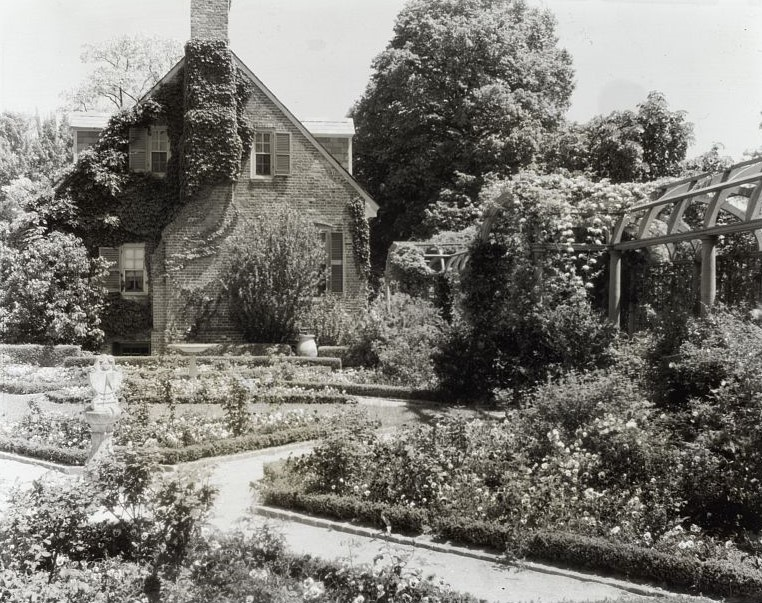
"York Hall," Captain George Preston Blow House, Route 1005 and Main Street, Yorktown; photo by Frances Benjamin Johnston, 1929. Griffin & Wynkoop, architects, made additions to 18th-century brick house after Blow's 1914 purchase. It was the home of Thomas Nelson Jr. (1738-1789), during the Revolutionary War. Landscape: Charles Freeman Gillette, from 1914. Today the house has been restored to its 18th-century character and is designated as a National Historic Landmark. It is operated as National Park Service site.

The house was built by Thomas "Scotch Tom" Nelson around 1730, and later occupied by his grandson, Founding Father Thomas Nelson, Jr. (1738-1789) during the American Revolutionary War. Nelson, Jr., who signed the Declaration of Independence as a delegate to the Second Continental Congress, was a planter, politician, and later governor of Virginia.

The house was used as a temporary headquarters by Lord Cornwallis, and a cannonball fired at siege of Yorktown is still lodged in one of the walls. It served as a hospital during the Civil War.

In 1914, it was purchased by Captain and Mrs. George P. Blow, who renamed it as "York Hall," by which name it was referred to in much of the historical literature of the time. The Blow family made a number of additions to update the property, which were designed by Griffin & Wynkoop.

In 1968, the National Park Service bought the property. It restored the house in 1976 to its 18th-century character. It has been designated as the Thomas Nelson House, a National Historical Landmark. It is also a contributing property to the Yorktown Battlefield Part of Colonial National Historical Park. It is open for tours as part of the Yorktown Battlefield attractions.

=== Haunting ===
The property is supposed to have been haunted by the spirit of a Redcoat soldier who was killed when Thomas Nelson, Jr. let the Marquis de Lafayette fire on his own house. It is one of many such stories in the Yorktown area linked to the Revolutionary War.
