= Grace Church (Yorktown, Virginia) =

Historic church in Virginia, United States

- Grace Episcopal Church
- U.S. National Register of Historic Places
- Virginia Landmarks Register
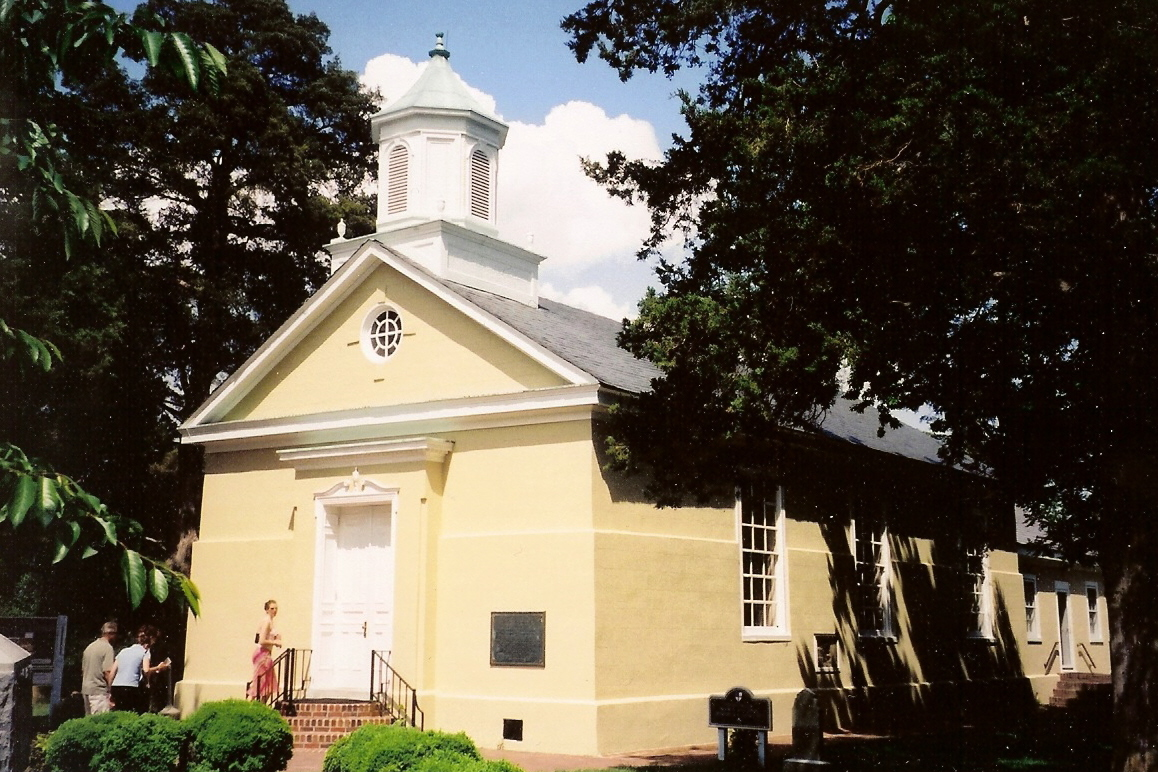
- Grace Church, 2003

- Location within Virginia Location within the United States
- Location: Rte. 1003 and Main St., Yorktown, Virginia
- Coordinates: 37°14′9″N 76°30′28″W
- Area: 1 acre (0.40 ha)
- Built: 1697
- Architectural style: Greek Revival
- NRHP reference No.: 70000832
- VLR No.: 099-0010

Significant dates
- Added to NRHP: September 15, 1970
- Designated VLR: June 2, 1970

Grace Church (also known as York-Hampton Parish Church) is a historic Episcopal church and cemetery at Route 1003 and Main Street in Yorktown, Virginia.

It was built in 1697 and later updated with a Greek Revival style. Thomas Nelson, Jr., a signer of the Declaration of Independence and other pre-Revolution Founding Fathers attended the church.

The building was added to the National Register of Historic Places in 1970.

== See also ==
- List of the oldest buildings in Virginia
