= William Nelson (governor) =

American planter and politician (1711–1772

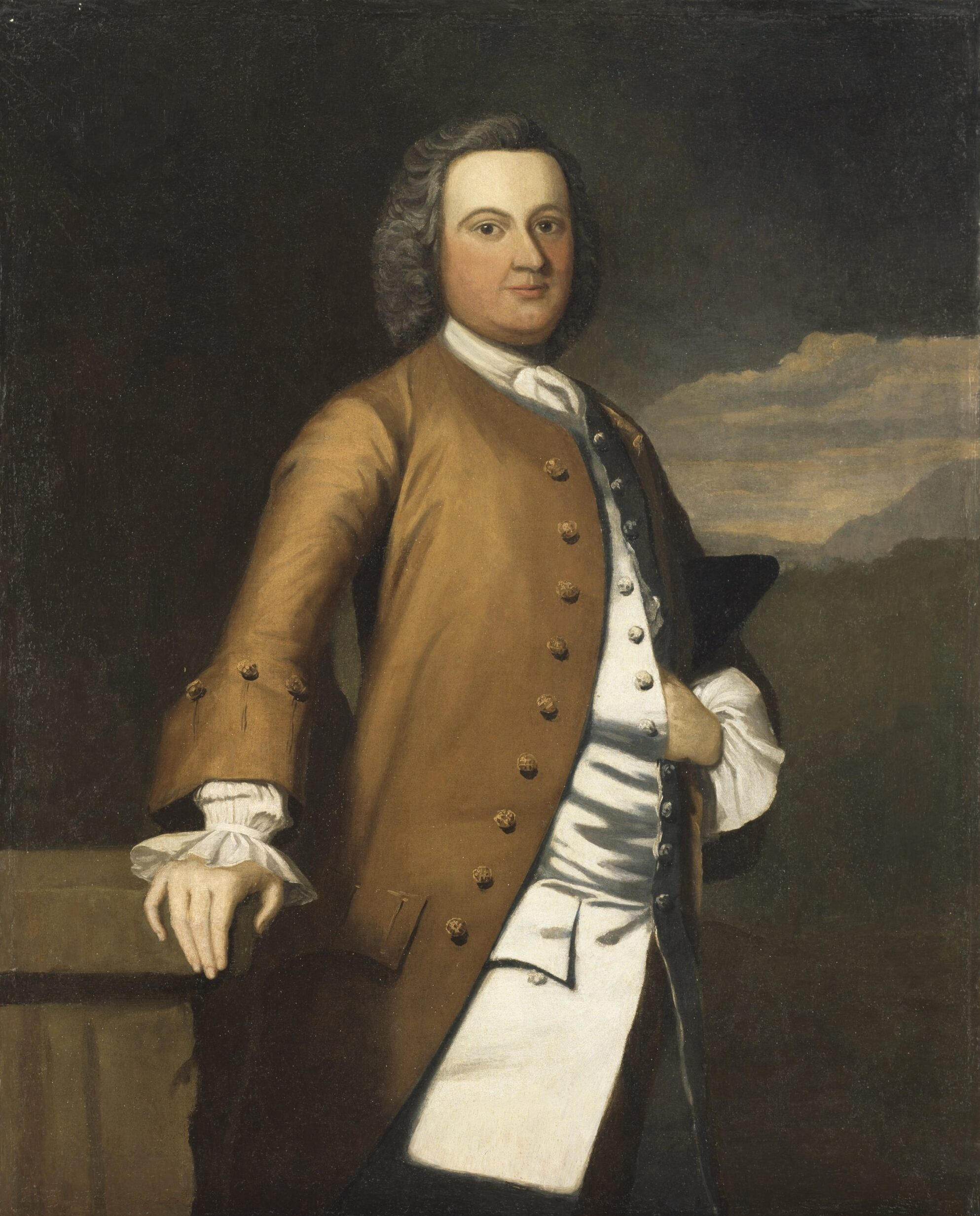
- Portrait by Robert Feke, c. 1749–1751

Governor of Virginia
- Acting; 1770–1771
- Monarch: George III
- Preceded by: Norborne Berkeley, baron de Botetourt
- Succeeded by: John Murray, 4th Earl of Dunmore

Member of the Virginia Governor's Council
- In office 1745-1772

Member of the House of Burgesses representing York County, Virginia
- In office 1742–1745
- Preceded by: John Buckner II
- Succeeded by: Thomas Nelson

Personal details
- Born: 1711 Yorktown, Virginia
- Died: November 19, 1772 (aged 60–61) Yorktown, Virginia
- Spouse: Elizabeth Burwell
- Children: Gen. Thomas Nelson Jr., Col. Hugh Nelson, Dr Nathaniel Nelson, Hon. William Nelson, Jr, Elizabeth Nelson Thompson and Robert Nelson
- Parent(s): Thomas "Scotch Tom" Nelson, Margaret Reade

William Nelson (1711 – November 19, 1772) was an American merchant, planter and politician from Yorktown, Virginia. Having served more than two decades on the Virginia Council of State (the upper house of the Virginia General Assembly in that colonial period), he became the colony's acting governor between the death of royal governor Norborne Berkeley in mid-October 1770 and the arrival of Lord Dunmore, in October 1771. Arguably the most famous of the six men of the same name to serve in the Virginia General Assembly, he represented York County for about three years in the House of Burgesses before being advanced to the Council of State.

== Early life ==
Nelson was born in 1711 to Margaret Reade and her merchant husband Thomas "Scotch Tom" Nelson. His maternal grandfather, the former burgess and sometimes acting Governor, Col. George Reade had owned significant property in York County, near the capital of the Colony of Virginia), although his son Robert Reade did not continue his political officeholding. His father had immigrated from Cumbria circa 1690, then settled in Yorktown where he became the town's leading merchant about 1705. Their next child was a daughter, Mary, who survived and ultimately married Edmund Burwell. A younger son, Thomas, would become the colony's secretary of state and later serve on the Virginia Governor's Council with this man. That man's sons (many with the same names of this man's children) also became active patriots, and both branches intermarried. Their mother Margaret had died by 1723, when her widower remarried, to Frances Housden Tucker. Both William and Thomas Nelson traveled to England as boys, where they received educations appropriate to their class. Meanwhile, their father built the (still-surviving) Nelson House about 1730.

== Career ==
As eldest son, William Nelson helped his father operate the family's store and merchant business in the port town on the York River. This involved what was known as the Triangular trade, trading Virginia tobacco for sale overseas, as well as importing goods and enslaved people from abroad, since Thomas Nelson was an agent of the Royal African Company. They had a ship named the 'Nelson' as well as a gristmill. William Nelson greatly expanded the business, as well as owned plantations operated using enslaved labor.

Nelson began his public life as one of the justices of the peace for York County (the justices jointly governing the county in that era). He became York County's sheriff in 1738. He began his colony-wide service in 1742, when York County voters elected him as one of their representatives in the House of Burgesses, the lower house of the Virginia General Assembly, but he only served in the part-time body for a partial term before his elevation to the upper house. Eight days after his father died in 1745, the governor nominated William Nelson (and with royal assent), Nelson (and later his brother Thomas) became a member of the assembly's upper house, the Governor's Council, which also functioned as the colony's highest court, and served until his death. Nelson was also appointed executor or co-executor of several estates, the most famous of which was of Governor Francis Fauquier.

In the years leading up to the American Revolution, Nelson actively supported the Patriot cause, including opposing the Stamp Act and other royal revenue measures after the French and Indian War. By this time, he had seniority and became president of the Governor's Council. Thus, he functioned as the colony's acting governor between the death of Lord Botetourt on October 15, 1770 and the arrival of his successor, Lord Dunmore, in August 1771.

== Personal life ==
He married Elizabeth Burwell (1717-1793), who bore (in order of age): Thomas Nelson Jr. (signer of the "Declaration of Independence", Brigadier General during the American Revolutionary War and governor of what became the Commonwealth of Virginia during that conflict); Col. Hugh Nelson (d. 1799), Dr. Nathaniel Nelson (died in Bermuda), Robert Nelson; William Nelson Jr. and Elizabeth Nelson Thompson.

== Death and legacy ==
Nelson died at Yorktown on November 19, 1772, before the American Revolutionary War began. His will admitted to probate named his brother Thomas Nelson, as well as prominent lawyer Robert Carter Nicholas and sons Thomas and Hugh as executors and guardians of the three youngest children. Nelson made charitable bequests to the public hospital for lunatics, as well as the poor of the parish, but primarily divided his property (including slaves, some of whom were named) among his children. His widow received 5000 pounds sterling as a lump sum and household goods, plus 250 pounds sterling a year, lesser sums from plantations near Yorktown called "Pennys" and "Tarrapin Point", plus relatively minor sums from plantations bequeathed to their sons, but the will specifically stated she did not receive anything from Nelson's warehouses. His sons General Thomas Nelson Jr., Colonel Hugh Nelson, Robert Nelson and William Nelson Jr. served during the conflict, with Robert and William Jr. being captured in the final campaign but surviving, and William Nelson Jr. later became not only a legislator and reviser of Virginia Laws, but a judge and law professor. However, the most distinguished of the sons was Thomas Nelson Jr., who became one of thirteen representatives who drafted the Articles of Confederation, as well as signed the Declaration of Independence, and (years after this man's death) governor of the Commonwealth of Virginia in the new United States of America. The Virginia Historical Society has published his papers.
