= History of the College of William & Mary =

University in Williamsburg, Virginia, US

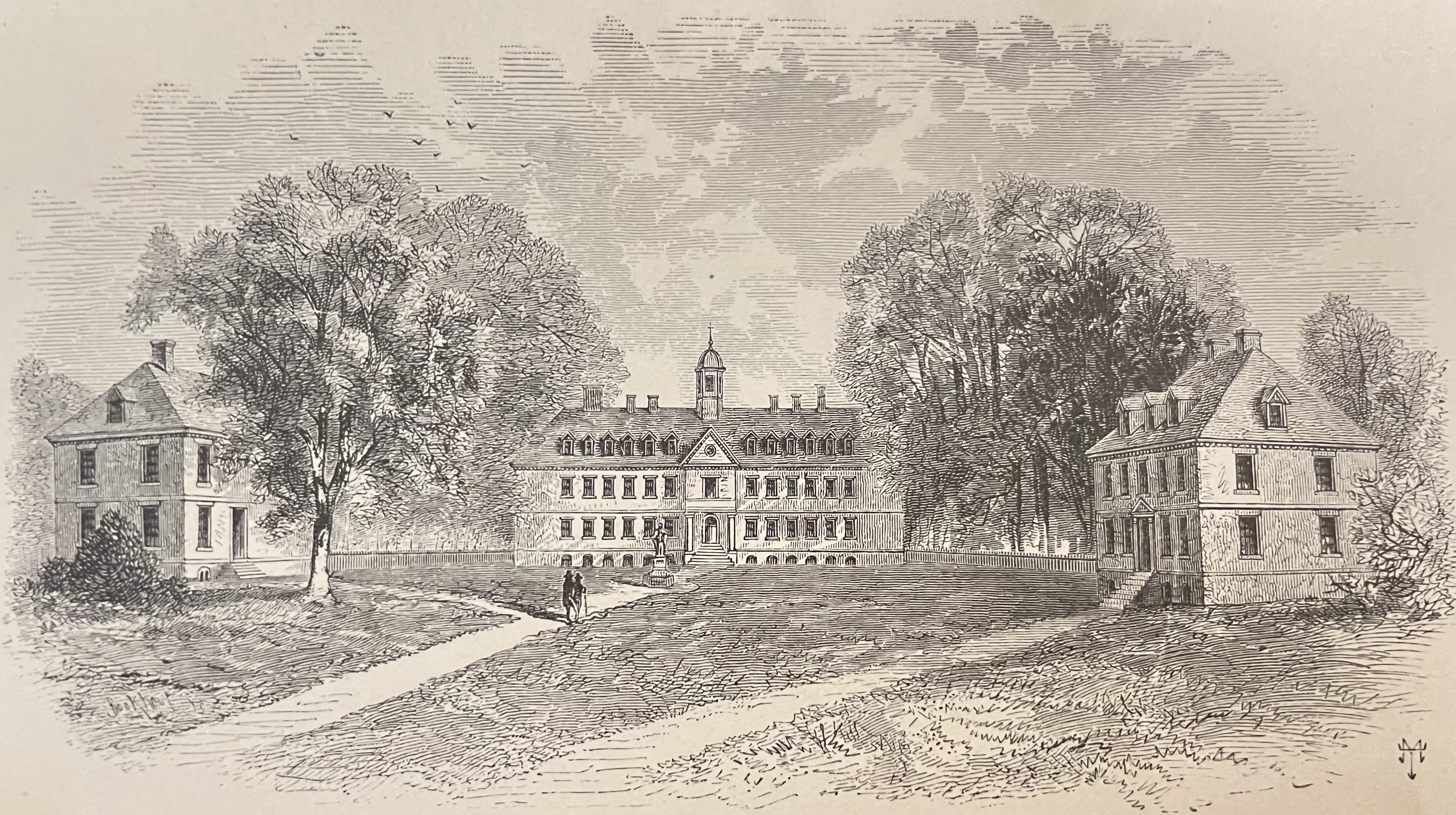
Print depicting Ancient Campus as it would have appeared before 1859. The Brafferton (left) and President's House (right) flank the Wren Building

The history of the College of William & Mary can be traced back to a 1693 royal charter establishing "a perpetual College of Divinity, Philosophy, Languages, and the good arts and sciences" in the English colony of Virginia. It fulfilled an early colonial vision dating back to 1618 to construct a university level program modeled after Cambridge and Oxford at Henricus. A plaque on the Wren Building, the college's first structure, ascribes the institution's origin to "the college proposed at Henrico." It was named for the reigning joint monarchs of England, William III and Mary II. The selection of the new college's location on high ground at the center ridge of the Virginia Peninsula at the tiny community of Middle Plantation is credited to its first President, Reverend Dr. James Blair, who was also the Commissary of the Bishop of London in Virginia. A few years later, the favorable location and resources of the new school helped Dr. Blair and a committee of 5 students influence the House of Burgesses and Governor Francis Nicholson to move the capital there from Jamestown. The following year, 1699, the town was renamed Williamsburg.

During the American Revolution about 75 years later, the college successfully made the transition from British support and a role in government and the established church under Bishop James Madison, and added professional programs including a School of Law under George Wythe. With buildings and finances both devastated by the American Civil War (1861–1865), through the perseverance of school presidents Benjamin Stoddert Ewell and Lyon Gardiner Tyler, funding from the U.S. Congress and the Commonwealth of Virginia eventually restored the infrastructure and facilitated expansion of the school's programs with a new emphasis on educating teachers for the state's new public school divisions.

In 1918, William & Mary became the first of Virginia's state-supported colleges and universities to admit women as well as men to its under graduate programs. Adjacent to the restored colonial capital area which became Colonial Williamsburg beginning in 1926, the school has long been involved in the programs and work there. A few blocks away from the campus in the Historic Area, where students continue to attend Bruton Parish Church, a tradition of over 300 years duration.

== Pre-charter ==
The first permanent settlement in the colony of Virginia was established at Jamestown in 1607 as a business venture funded by the Virginia Company of London and to replenish the English treasury. The role of the Protestant Church of England and its relationship to the English monarchy had been established in the 1530s by King Henry VIII, when he broke with the Papacy in Rome. In the Acts of Supremacy, Henry abandoned Rome completely, asserted the independence of the Ecclesia Anglicana and appointed himself and his successors as the supreme rulers of the Church of England. This sovereign relationship was later established when the original colony became a crown colony in 1624. The primary leaders of the colony, from the Virginia Company of London, and the accompanying clergy believed they could spread Anglicanism to the Native Americans in the new colony. The spiritual beliefs of the Native Americans differed from the colonists and were incorrectly assumed by colonists as a lack of education and literacy, due to the indigenous Powhatan people who lived in the area, that they called "Tsenacommacah", writing systems of petroglyph, pictogram and petroform. The colonists assumed teaching English literacy would result in enlightenment in civil and religious practices, and bring them into the fold as English subjects.

In November 1618, the Virginia Company of London gave orders for university grounds to be laid at Henrico, 12 miles from the current city of Richmond, to include an Indian School branch, and endowed it with 10,000 acres of land. A school of higher education for both Native American young men and the sons of the colonists was one of the earliest goals of the leaders of the Virginia Colony. In May 1619, the treasurer of the Virginia Company, Sir Edwin Sandys, reported that funds had been collected toward the proposed college. The Virginia General Assembly, established July 30, 1619, proceeded on July 31, 1619, to petition the Virginia Company for workmen from England to build the college. In May 1620, the Virginia Company appointed George Thorpe (Virginia colonist) to be first deputy in charge of the college lands. Within the first decade, a promising start of a "university" was initiated as part of the progressive colonial outpost of Henricus under the leadership of Sir Thomas Dale. In March 1622, Thorpe was killed and Henrico destroyed, postponing the college, in an Indian uprising of the Indian massacre of 1622. In 1624, the college plans were abandoned when the charter of the Virginia Company was revoked and Jamestown became a royal colony. It would be almost 70 more years before their efforts to establish a school of higher education would be successful. In 1661 the college and free school land purchase was authorized by an act passed by the General Assembly but no progress was made. By July 1690 the college was proposed again and subscriptions in Virginia were authorized by Lieutenant Governor Francis Nicholson with a financial support appeal to Virginia traders who were merchants in England. In May 1691 the General Assembly issued instructions for the founding of the college to Reverend James Blair, the representative of the Bishop of London, sending him to England to present the request to the King and Queen to grant a charter for the college.

== Founding ==
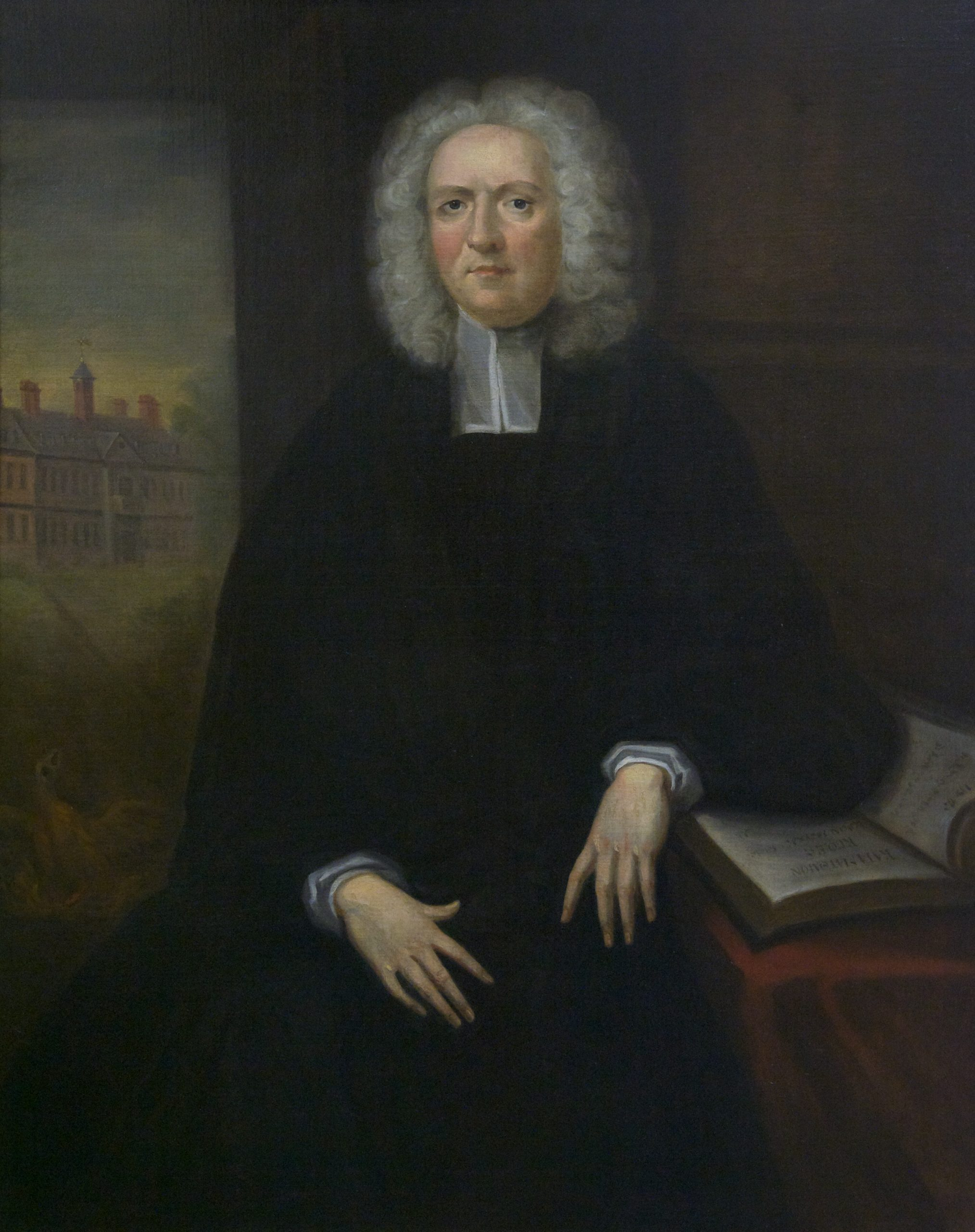
James Blair, the founder of the College of William & Mary

In 1691, under instruction from the House of Burgesses, Scottish clergyman James Blair arrived in England to secure the charter to re-establish a school of higher education. Some scholars believe Blair utilized some of the original plans from the elaborate but ill-fated earlier attempt at Henricus. Reverend Blair, as the representative for the Bishop of London in the colony, journeyed to London. Control of the Native Americans of the Powhatan Confederacy was no longer a priority in the Colony, as they had been largely decimated and reduced to reservations after the last major conflict in 1644. However, establishing the Jamestown College and assimilating Native Americans in general was retained as a vital part of the school's mission, as possible moral and political incentives to help successfully gain approval in London. Henry Compton, the current bishop of London, John Tillotson (Archbishop of Canterbury), and others supported Blair's assignment from the Virginia Colony to secure the charter for the college.

The college was founded on February 8, 1693, under a royal charter (technically, by letters patent) granted by King William III and Queen Mary II, to establish the College of William & Mary in Virginia to "make, found and establish a certain Place of Universal Study, a perpetual College of Divinity, Philosophy, Languages, and the good arts and sciences...to be supported and maintained, in all time coming." Named in honor of the reigning monarchs King William III and Queen Mary II, the college is the second oldest in the United States and was one of the original Colonial colleges. The Charter named Blair as the college's first president (a lifetime appointment which he held until his death in 1743). The king provided funds allocated from tobacco taxes, along with the Surveyor-General's Office "profits" and 10,000 acres each in the Pamunkey Neck and on Blackwater Swamp. Additional funds came from pirate loot courtesy of buccaneers Edward Davis, Lionel Wafer, and John Hinson; they had been arrested in Virginia and sent to England, where Blair interceded to secure their pardon in exchange for "donation" of a portion of their plunder to his project. Founded as an Anglican institution; governors were required to be members of the Church of England, and professors were required to declare adherence to the Thirty-Nine Articles. The charter called for a center of higher education consisting of three schools: the Grammar School, the Philosophy School and the Divinity School. The Philosophy School instructed students in the advanced study of moral philosophy (logic, rhetoric, ethics) as well as natural philosophy (physics, metaphysics and mathematics); upon completion of this coursework, the Divinity School prepared these young men for ordination into the Church of England.

This early curriculum, a precursor to the present-day liberal arts program, made William & Mary the first American college with a full faculty. The college has achieved many other notable academic firsts. Although most other planned goals were met or exceeded, the efforts to educate and convert the natives to Christianity were to prove less than successful once the college was established.

== Colonial history ==
Until the Revolution, most of our leading [men] were the alumni of William and Mary.

— Edmund Randolph

In November 1693, the college was given a seat in the House of Burgesses and the General Assembly passed the act to establish the College site "as near the church now standing in Middle Plantation old fields as convenience will permit", and on the same day voted on funding for the college to be supported by tobacco taxes and an export duty on furs and skins. "Middle Plantation" was changed to "Williamsburg" in 1699 when the colonial capital was moved there from Jamestown. The peaceful situation with the Native Americans in the Virginia Peninsula area by that time, as well as the central location in the developed portion of the colony located only about 8 miles (13 km) from Jamestown, but on high ground midway between the James and York Rivers, must have appealed to the college's first president, for he is credited with selecting a site for the new college on the western outskirts of the tiny community of Middle Plantation in James City County.

In December 1693 a tract of 330 acres (1.3 km^{2}) was purchased from Captain Thomas Ballard, the proprietor of Rich Neck Plantation, in the amount of £170 for the College site just a short distance from the almost new brick Bruton Parish Church, a focal point of the extant community, and not far from the headwaters of Archer's Hope Creek, later renamed College Creek. The college library contains two of the boundary stones erected in 1694 that marked the property, which are available for viewing.

In May 1694 the College of Arms in London granted the college's coat of arms, described as: "Vert a Colledge, or Edifice mason'd Argent in Chief a Sun rising Or the Hemisphere proper," i.e., a college building in silver, on a green field; a golden sun at half orb against a blue sky. The new school opened in temporary buildings. Properly called the "College Building," the first version of the Wren Building was built at Middle Plantation on a picturesque site. On August 8, 1695, the laying of the first foundation bricks, later called the Main Building, were attended by Governor Edmund Andros and the Council of Virginia. It was renamed the Sir Christopher Wren Building between 1928 and 1931 when it was restored. In 1700 the front and the north wing were completed. The present-day College still stands upon those grounds, adjacent to and just west of the restored historic area known in modern times as Colonial Williamsburg.

After the statehouse at Jamestown burned in 1698, the legislature moved temporarily to Middle Plantation, as it had in the past. On May 1, 1699, the College held a May Day celebration, with the House of Burgess members in attendance by invitation of Governor Nicholson. On display for the Burgesses were examples "of the Improvement of your Youth in Learning and Education", along with five student speeches, including one extolling the advantages for the site of the capital as Williamsburg. The capital was permanently relocated there, and Middle Plantation was renamed Williamsburg in 1699. Following its designation as the Capital of the Colony, immediate provision was made for construction of a capitol building and for platting the new city according to the survey of Theodorick Bland. Both the extant Bruton Parish Church and the College Building held prominent locations in the new plan, with the Wren Building site aligned at the center of the western end of the new major central roadway, Duke of Gloucester Street, itself laid along a pathway running along the midpoint ridge of the Peninsula and long a dividing line between two of the original eight shires of Virginia, York and James City Counties. At the other (eastern) end of the Duke of Gloucester Street, opposite the College Building, the new Capitol was built.

Williamsburg, which was granted a royal charter as a city in 1722, served as the capital of Colonial Virginia from 1699 to 1780. During this time, the college served as a law center and lawmakers frequently used its buildings. It educated future U.S. Presidents Thomas Jefferson, James Monroe, and John Tyler. The College issued George Washington his surveyor's certificate, which led to his first public office. Washington was later appointed the first American Chancellor in 1788 following the American Revolution. Serving as chancellor of the college was to be his last public office, one he held until his death in 1799.

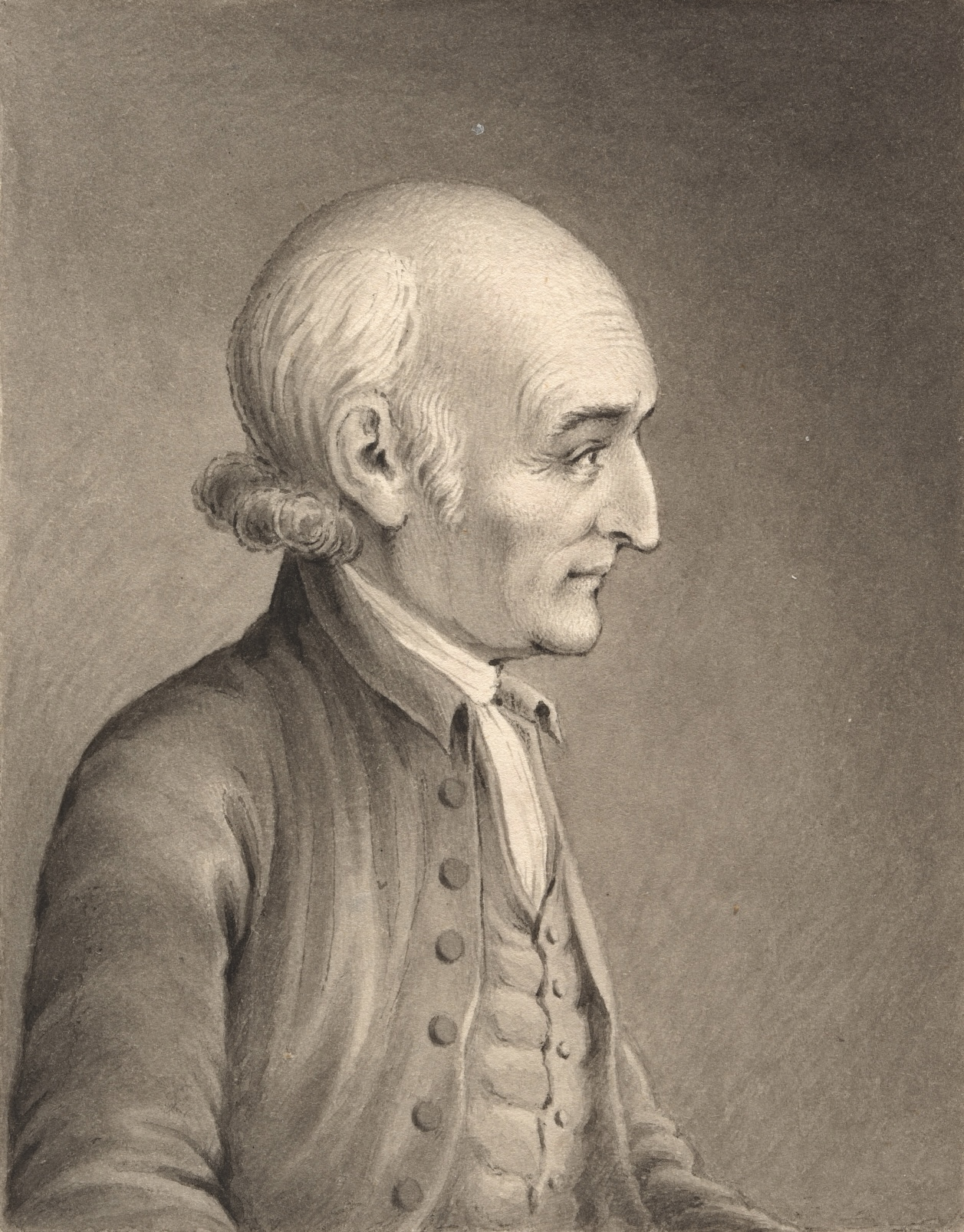
George Wythe, America's first law professor

George Wythe, widely regarded as a pioneer in American legal education, attended the college as a young man, but dropped out unable to afford the fees. Wythe went on to become one of the more distinguished jurists of his time. Jefferson, who later referred to Wythe as "my second father," studied under Wythe from 1762 to 1767. By 1779, Wythe held the nation's first law professorship at the college. Wythe's other students included Henry Clay, James Monroe and John Marshall.

The college also educated four U.S. Supreme Court Justices (John Marshall, John Blair, Philip P. Barbour and Bushrod Washington) as well as several important members of government including Peyton Randolph and Henry Clay.

== American Revolution ==
During the American Revolution, Freedom of Religion and the Separation of Church and State were each established in Virginia beginning in 1776. The English government and the Church of England each lost prominence and control. While they desired independent government, leaders and citizens of the new state and country did not reject their church, only its structure in relationship to government. Worship continued during the difficult years of the War and thereafter. Although shorn of a governmental role and financial support, the Church survived in modified form as what is now known as The Episcopal Church (United States). Before the Revolution, there had been no bishop in the colony. After the War, the first Episcopal Bishop of Virginia was the Right Reverend James Madison (1749–1812). He was a cousin of future President of the United States James Madison, and was ordained in England just before the American Revolution.

Future U.S. President James Madison was a key figure in the transition to religious freedom in Virginia, and Reverend Madison, his cousin and Thomas Jefferson, who was on the Board of Visitors, helped The College of William & Mary to make the transition as well, and to become a university with the establishment of the graduate schools in law and medicine in the process.

A 1771 graduate of the college, and an ordained minister in the Church of England, Reverend James Madison was a teacher at William & Mary as the hostilities of the American Revolution broke out, and he organized his students into a local militia. During 1777, he served as chaplain of the Virginia House of Delegates. The same year, Loyalist sympathies of the College President, Reverend John Camm (who had been the initial litigant in the Parson's Cause case 1758-1764), brought about his removal from the faculty. Reverend Madison became the 8th president of The College of William & Mary in October 1777, the first president following the United States Declaration of Independence.

As its president, Reverend Madison worked with the new leaders of Virginia, most notably Jefferson, on a reorganization and changes for the college which included the abolition of the Divinity School and the Indian School, which was also known as the Brafferton School. The 1693 royal charter provided that Indian School of the College educate American Indian youth. College founder James Blair had arranged financing for that purpose using income from Brafferton Manor in Yorkshire, England, which had passed to the estate of scientist Robert Boyle. The Indian School, intended to "civilize" Indian youth, was begun in 1700. However, Native American parents resisted enrolling and boarding their children, and many of those who enrolled were captive children from enemy tribes, including the first six students. Enrollment was never strong, revived somewhat after construction of the fine brick Brafferton School building in 1723. The school was never very successful in achieving any quantity of Indian conversions to Christianity, but did help educate several generations of interpreters who could aid in communication. The school's dedicated income from England was interrupted by the Revolutionary War. By 1779, the Brafferton School had permanently closed, although "The Brafferton", as it is known in modern times, remains a landmark building on the campus.

In June 1781, as British troops moved down the Peninsula, Lord Cornwallis made the president's house his headquarters, and the institution was closed for a few months of that year, which saw the surrender at Yorktown on October 19.

== Antebellum era 1776–1861 ==
The colonies declared their independence in 1776 and the College of William & Mary severed formal ties with Britain. However, the college's connection to British history remains as a distinct point of pride; it maintains a relationship with the British monarchy and includes former Prime Minister Margaret Thatcher among those who have served as chancellors. Queen Elizabeth II visited the College twice.

In 1842, alumni of the College formed the Society of the Alumni which is now the sixth oldest alumni organization in the United States. In 1859, a great fire caused destruction to the college. The Alumni House is one of only several original antebellum structures remaining on campus; notable others include the Wren Building, the President's House, and the Brafferton.

== Slavery and William & Mary ==
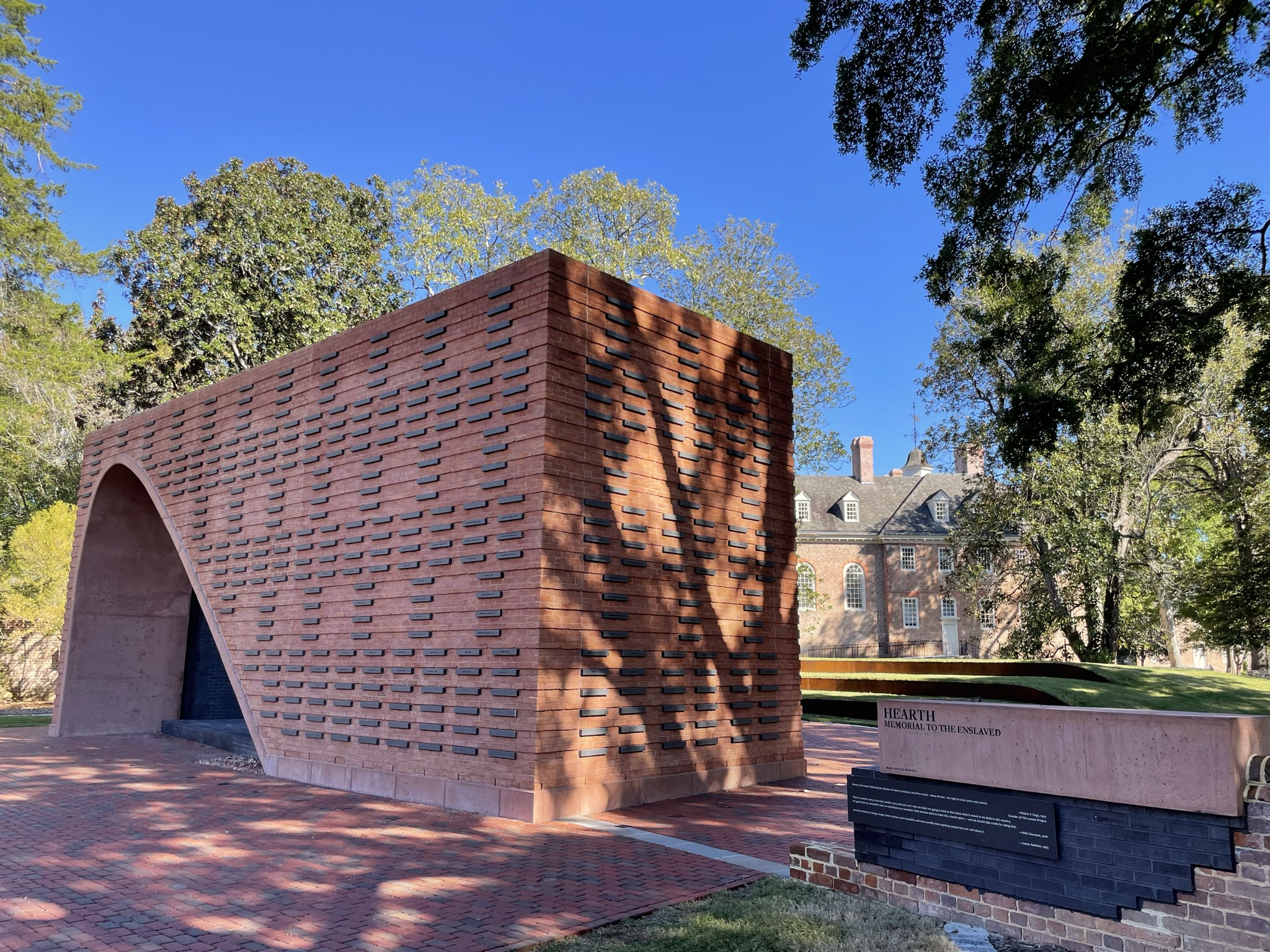
Hearth: Memorial to the Enslaved adjacent to the Wren Building; the original Wren Building was constructed using enslaved laborers

"From its founding in 1693 to the outbreak of the Civil War, the college owned, hired out, and rented slaves.... Professors such as Thomas Roderick Dew [William & Mary President 1836–1846] and Henry A. Washington argued that slavery was a benevolent institution serving a greater moral good.... Professors' and students' paternalistic defenses of slavery in the antebellum period left an important impact on racial struggles at the College of William & Mary." President Dew, author of A Review of the Debates in the Legislature of 1831 and 1832, was the intellectual leader of the pro-slavery movement, and played a major role in ending the growing movement for liberating all of Virginia's slaves following Nat Turner's revolt of 1831.

In 2009 the Board of Visitors "acknowledged that the university had owned and exploited slave labor from its founding to the Civil War; and that it had failed to take a stand against segregation during the Jim Crow Era." With its support, the Lemon Project: A Journey of Reconciliation was founded. (Lemon is the name of a slave owned by the college.) "The Lemon Project is a multifaceted and dynamic attempt to rectify wrongs perpetrated against African Americans by William & Mary through action or inaction." It is funded by the office of the provost. Starting in 2011, the Lemon Project hosts an annual symposium "on the past experiences of African-Americans in and around the College of William & Mary so as to provide a usable past for our future."

== Civil War, Reconstruction, becoming a state institution ==
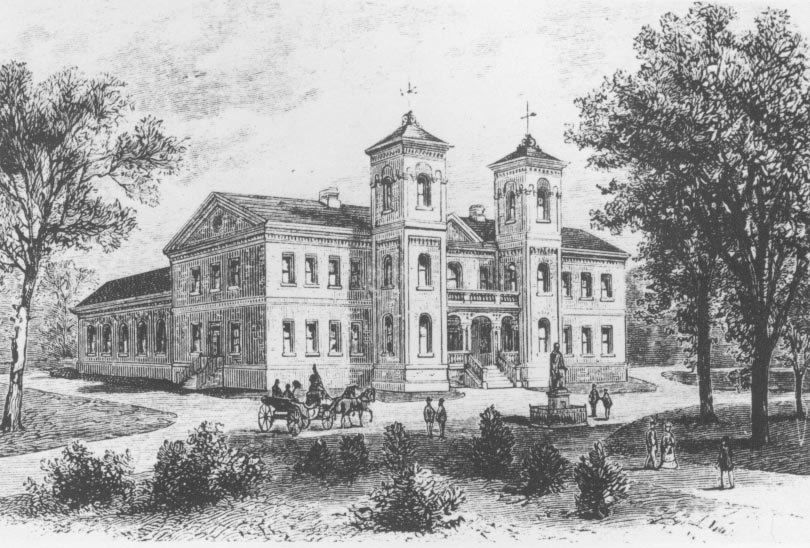
College Building in 1859

At the outset of the American Civil War (1861–1865), enlistments in the Confederate Army depleted the student body and on May 10, 1861, the faculty voted to close the college for the duration of the conflict. The College Building was used as a Confederate barracks and later as a hospital, first by Confederate, and later Union forces. The Battle of Williamsburg was fought nearby during the Peninsula Campaign on May 5, 1862, and the city fell to the Union the next day. The Brafferton building of the College was used for a time as quarters for the commanding officer of the Union garrison occupying the town. On September 9, 1862, drunken soldiers of the 5th Pennsylvania Cavalry set fire to the College Building, purportedly in an attempt to prevent Confederate snipers from using it for cover. Much damage was done to the community during the Union occupation, which lasted until September 1865.

Following the Union victory and the end of the Civil War, Virginia was destitute. The college's 16th president, Benjamin Stoddert Ewell, could only reopen the school in 1869 by using his personal funds. He later sought war reparations from the U.S. Congress, but he was repeatedly put off. Ewell's request was finally honored, and Federal funds were appropriated, but not until 1893. Meanwhile, after some years of struggling, the college closed in 1881 due to lack of funding.

A legend has it that, every single morning of the seven-year period between the college's closure in 1881 and its reopening in 1888, President Ewell would arise and ring the bell calling students to class, so it could never be said that William & Mary had abandoned its mission to educate the young men of Virginia.

In 1888, William & Mary resumed operations under a substitute charter, when the Commonwealth of Virginia passed an act appropriating $10,000 to establish a state normal school for white men at the college. Dr. Ewell, who had grown quite old and spent much of his private fortune attempting to reopen the college, was finally able to retire, with the future of his beloved college on a new and more stable course again.

== 20th century: coeducational and teacher training programs ==
Lyon Gardiner Tyler (1853–1935) became the 17th president of the college following President Ewell's retirement. Tyler began expanding the college into a modern institution. He assembled a faculty known affectionately as the "Seven Wise Men," himself holding the chair of history. In March 1906 the General Assembly passed an act taking over the grounds of the colonial institution, and it has remained publicly supported ever since.

In 1918, William & Mary was one of the first universities in Virginia to become coeducational with its admission of women. During this time, enrollment increased from 104 students in 1889 to 1269 students by 1932. Tyler retired in 1919 as president.

Lyon Tyler was succeeded by the college's 18th president, J.A.C. Chandler, who continued and greatly expanded the initiatives of that began under Dr. Tyler. Also a historian and author, Dr. Chandler had spent his career prior to coming to William & Mary in education, and had developed an acclaimed "Model Schools" program at Richmond City Public Schools during the ten years he served there as Superintendent of Schools.

Dr. Chandler was both innovative and energetic. As he continued programs of modernization and coeducation begun under Tyler, he had access to Tyler, who was still living nearby at his home in Charles City County. Ironically, Dr. Tyler outlived Chandler by a year.

Chandler would sponsor the construction of the first Catholic parish in Williamsburg by allocating land an empty lot and a home that had previously housed a fraternity at a reduced rate. The chapel built on that land would ultimately become the National Shrine of Our Lady of Walsingham and the home would house the first classes of the since-moved Walsingham Academy.

He also can be credited with the recruitment of Reverend Dr. W.A.R. Goodwin, who was comfortably serving a wealthy church in Rochester, New York, but as Dr. Chandler knew, still had strong ties and dreams for Williamsburg. Beginning ostensibly at William & Mary as an instructor and fund-raiser, Dr. Goodwin was soon pursuing historical restoration ideas and the funding for them, in addition to raising funds for the school's programs in general.

The dedication of William & Mary's new Phi Beta Kappa Hall in 1926 gave Dr. Goodwin the opportunity to spend time with industrialist and philanthropist John D. Rockefeller Jr., and his wife, Abby Aldrich Rockefeller, as they visited Williamsburg with three of their children. Dr. Goodwin, who was also rector of Bruton Parish Church, shared his dreams and visions of restoring as much as possible of the "birthplace of America's democracy". While his father had been the hard-driving businessman who generated a lot of animosity around the country, as he was the "front man" for Standard Oil, his only son, John Jr., was a much more shy and reserved individual, whose became a philanthropist with his wife in handling the family's great wealth. Dr. Goodwin was successful, possibly beyond the wildest dreams of him or Dr. Chandler, in getting John and Abby to become part of the dream that ended up becoming Colonial Williamsburg (CW).

Although most of the Restoration eventually came under a foundation separate from the college, the ties between the College and CW remain close. Notably the restorations/reconstructions of the Sir Christopher Wren Building, the President's House and the Brafferton (the President's office) between 1928 and 1932 were among what was accomplished on the campus itself which was of great benefit to the College

Dr. Chandler had many activities going on in the 1920s other than the Restoration, which became increasingly Dr. Goodwin's principal focus. As a former public school leader, Dr. Chandler knew firsthand of the urgent need in the state for additional efforts to educate teachers and other professionals for the public schools throughout the state.

Despite facing the challenges presented by the Great Depression and his own failing health as the college entered the 1930s, Chandler's greatest legacy at William & Mary is considered by many to be School of Education, which began a long continuing tradition of providing an education to many of Virginia's public school teachers. Although he had left local service there many years earlier, it is symbolic that Richmond Public Schools named a new school after Dr. Chandler shortly after his death, the only former W&M President accorded such an honor in the capital city.

During Dr. Chandler's 14-year tenure, the college's full-time faculty grew to over 100 and the student body grew from 300 to over 1200 students, despite the Depression. Affordable and accessible education was also a hallmark of Chandler's tenure. In 1930, William & Mary expanded its territorial range by establishing a branch in Norfolk, Virginia. This extension would eventually become the independent state-supported institution known as Old Dominion University. Other branches around the state were to follow. Partially as a result, when in competition for state higher education funding, the college has enjoyed an especially supportive relationship with the Virginia General Assembly, which partially funds the various local programs for K-12 public school education throughout the state. The School of Education has continued and expanded that commitment by conducting in-service training and summer programs which enable continuing education of teachers and other instructional personnel. As a result, many of Virginia's public school teachers who utilize these services later achieve masters and doctoral degrees, with some advancing to positions of leadership in school divisions or with the State Department of Education.

== Mid 1930s through WW II ==
William & Mary's budding "Air School" begun under Dr. Chandler. The college had two different facilities during its short venture into aviation. Both were located originally along what is now VA-Route 603 (Mooretown Road). The newer facility changed to private operation and was the namesake for modern-day Airport Road in York County. The program was a casualty of a combination of the economic environment of the Depression, Dr. Chandler's failing health, and more than any other factor, most likely the changes in a growing technology which quickly shifted to the military and commercial sector.

Significant campus construction continued under the college's nineteenth president, John Stewart Bryan. Son of Joseph Bryan, a prominent Richmonder, John Stewart was a newspaperman and businessman. As Virginia recovered from the Depression, in 1935, the Sunken Gardens were constructed, just west of the Wren Building. The sunken design is taken from a similar landscape feature at Chelsea Hospital in London, designed by Sir Christopher Wren.

== Post WW-II through modern times ==
Queen Elizabeth II and Prince Philip, Duke of Edinburgh visited the College on October 16, 1957, where the Queen spoke to the college community from the balcony of the Wren Building. The Queen again visited the College on May 4, 2007, as part of her state visit for the 400th anniversary of the establishment of the settlement at Jamestown.

In 1974, Jay Winston Johns willed Ash Lawn-Highland, the 535-acre (2.17 km^{2}) historic Albemarle County, Virginia estate of alumnus and U.S. President James Monroe, to the college. The college restored this historic presidential home near Charlottesville and opened it to the public.

A decision in October 2006 by 26th President Gene Nichol regarding a cross in the Wren Building chapel resulted in the Wren Cross controversy. Citing concerns regarding religious pluralism, the cross was removed. After public outcry by members of the campus and alumni community, as well as coverage on The 700 Club by Pat Robertson, the cross was returned to the chapel. The cross is presently used liturgically by the Episcopal Canterbury and Catholic Campus Ministry.

In 2018, Katherine Rowe replaced Taylor Reveley and became the first female president of the college after 325 years. As part of the 2019-2020 COVID-19 pandemic, the college cancelled all on-campus classes for a week in March 2020, with President Rowe later announcing the remainder of the semester would take place online and requesting students remain off campus.

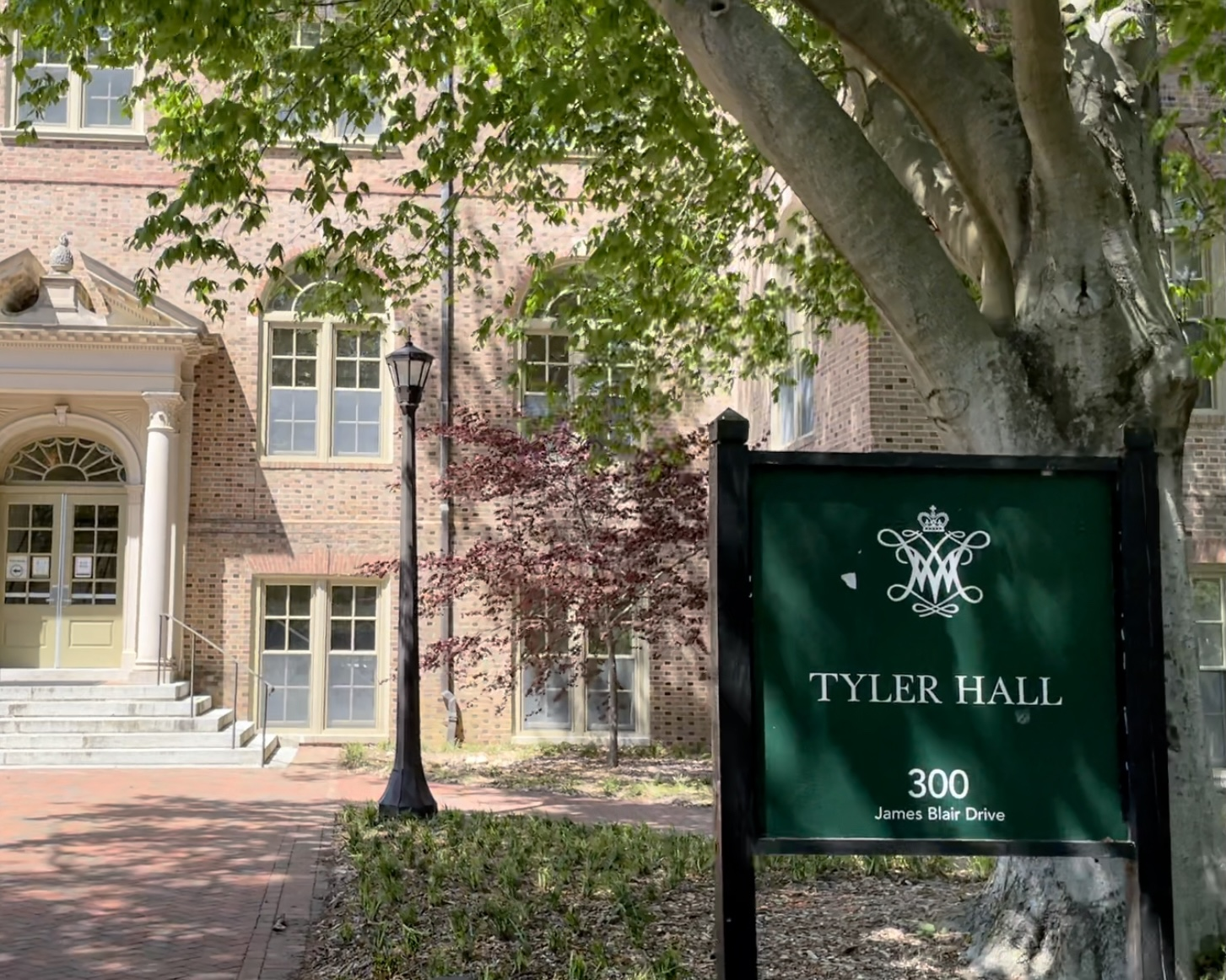
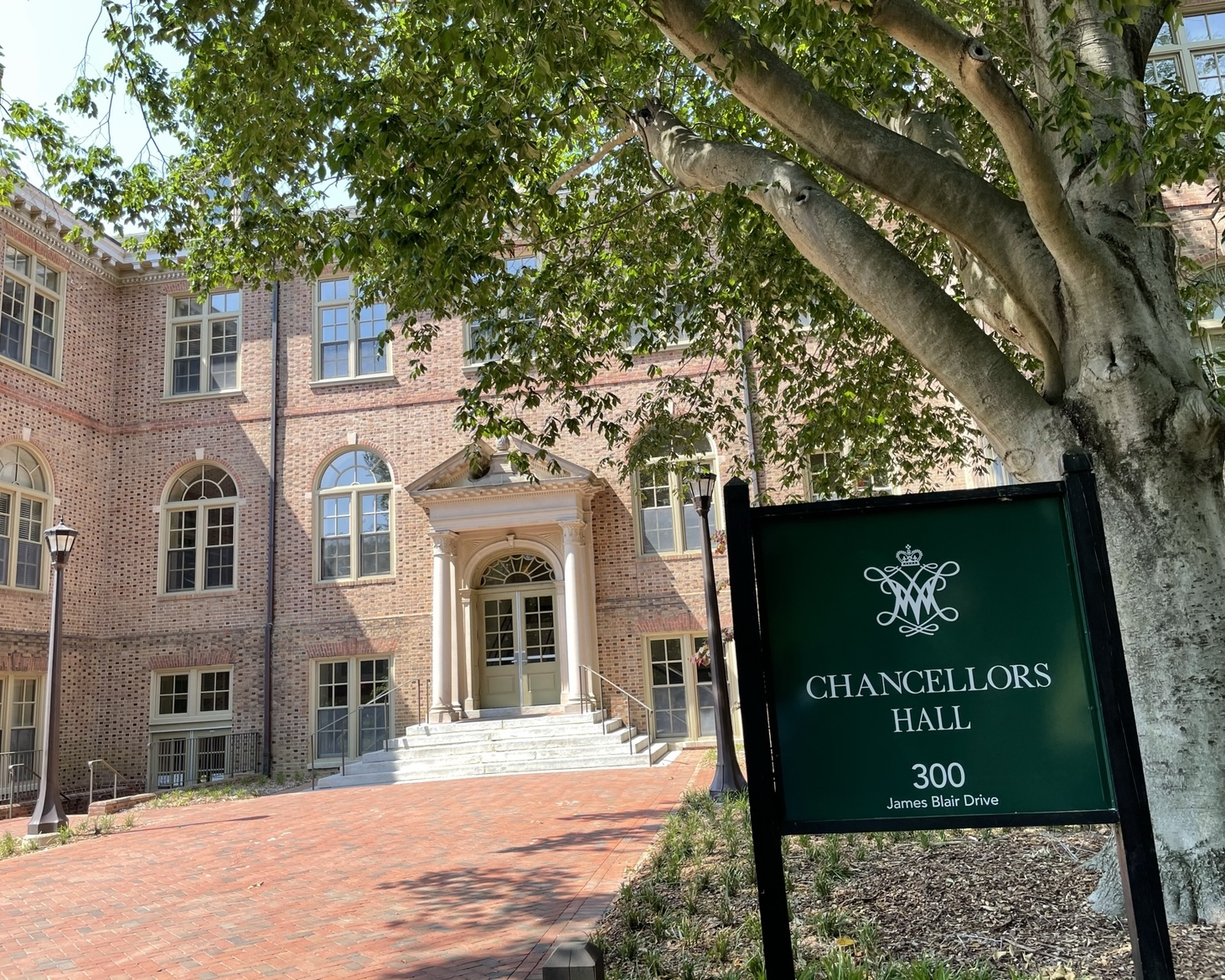
Tyler Hall (left) was renamed to Chancellor's Hall, its original name, in April 2021.

Following the George Floyd protests and associated movements as well as student and faculty pressure in 2020 and 2021, several buildings, halls, and other entities were renamed. Maury Hall (named for Confederate sailor Matthew Fontaine Maury) on the Virginia Institute of Marine Science campus and Trinkle Hall (named for Governor Elbert Lee Trinkle) of Campus Center were renamed in September 2020 to York River Hall and Unity Hall respectively. In April 2021, three buildings were renamed at following a vote by the Board of Visitors: Morton Hall (named for professor Richard Lee Morton) to John E. Boswell Hall (for LGBT advocate and alum John Boswell), Taliaferro Hall (named for Confederate General William Taliaferro) to Hulon L. Willis Sr. Hall (Hulon Willis Sr. was the first Black student at the College), and Tyler Hall (named for President John Tyler and his son) to its original name of Chancellors’ Hall (the hall had been renamed in 1988).

== Sir Christopher Wren Building ==
The Wren Building with a snow-covered statute of Lord Botetourt

The building officially referred to as the "Sir Christopher Wren Building" was so named upon its renovation in 1931 to honor the English architect Sir Christopher Wren. The basis for the 1930s name is a 1724 history in which Hugh Jones stated that the 1699 design was "first modelled by Sir Christopher Wren" and then was adapted "by the Gentlemen there" in Virginia; little is known about how it looked, since it burned within a few years of its completion. It is unknown if Sir Christopher Wren did actually design the building, since he never set foot in North America. Today's Wren Building is based on the design of its 1716 replacement. The college's alumni association recently published an article suggesting that Wren's connection to the 1931 building is a viable subject of investigation. A follow-up letter clarified the apocryphal nature of the Wren connection.

In the early 20th century, the Reverend Dr. W.A.R. Goodwin and John D. Rockefeller Jr. undertook a massive reconstruction and restoration project in Williamsburg—the project culminated in Colonial Williamsburg. The Wren Building was the first major building to be reconstructed or restored as part of the project. Following a drawing on the Bodleian copper plate (ca. 1740) and plans Thomas Jefferson drew of the interior in 1772, the Boston architectural firm of Perry, Shaw & Hepburn rebuilt the building to its second form (1715–1859). The architectural firm subsequently designed complete reconstructions of the Capitol and the Governor's Palace, the original versions of which had burned during the eighteenth century.

Two other buildings around the Wren Building complete a triangle known as "Ancient Campus": the Brafferton (built in 1723 and originally housing the Indian School, now the president and provost's offices) and the President's House (built in 1732).

The Wren Building is the oldest educational building in continuous use in the United States, although it ceased to serve its original function several times over the centuries. The Wren Building was known in colonial times as "The College" because, in the early years of the institution, the entire College of William & Mary consisted solely of the Wren Building. Inside its hallowed walls, all students (males only at that time) lived, ate, studied, worshiped and learned.

== Firsts ==
William & Mary is the second-oldest institution of higher learning in the United States, established in 1693 (Harvard is the oldest).

The college was the first to teach political economy; Adam Smith's Wealth of Nations was a required textbook. In the reform of 1779, William & Mary became the first college in America to become a university, establishing faculties of law and medicine; it was also the first college to establish a chair of modern languages. Chemistry was taught beginning in the nineteenth century; alumnus and future Massachusetts Institute of Technology founder William Barton Rogers served as the college's professor of natural philosophy and chemistry from 1828 to 1835.

Beginning with his 1778 Bill for the More General Diffusion of Knowledge, alumnus and future University of Virginia founder Thomas Jefferson was involved with efforts to secularize and reform the college's curriculum. Jefferson guided the college to adopt the nation's first elective system of study and to introduce the first student-adjudicated Honor System.

Also at Jefferson's behest, the college appointed his friend and mentor George Wythe as the first professor of law in America in 1779. John Marshall, who would later go on to become Chief Justice of the U.S. Supreme Court, was one of Wythe's students. The college's Marshall-Wythe School of Law is the oldest law school in the United States.

Along with establishment of new, firmer financial footing, the creation of the graduate schools in law and medicine officially made the "College" a school meeting the contemporary definition of a "university" by 1779, notwithstanding the retention of the original name as set forth in the 1693 Royal Charter.

== Secret societies ==
The College of William & Mary has a rich tradition of secret societies and is home to the nation's first academic secret society, the Flat Hat Club. Although the pressures of the American Civil War forced many Societies to disappear, most of them were revived during the 20th Century. Some of the secret societies known to currently exist at the College are the Seven Society (Order of the Crown and Dagger), Wren Society, Bishop James Madison Society, Flat Hat Club, Alpha Club, The Society, 13 Club, Eagle J, the Spades, and W Society. In addition to the popular culture notion of secret societies' wealth and extensive alumni networks, William & Mary's focus on the betterment of the college through philanthropy of a clandestine nature.

John Heath and William Short (Class of 1779) founded the Phi Beta Kappa academic honor society at William & Mary on December 5, 1776, as a secret literary and philosophical society. Additional chapters were soon established at Yale and at Harvard, and there are now 270 chapters nationwide. Alumni John Marshall and Bushrod Washington were two of the earliest members of Phi Beta Kappa, elected in 1778 and 1780, respectively.

== See also ==
- List of The College of William & Mary presidents
