= Old Dominion–William & Mary rivalry =

American college sports rivalry

School	Old Dominion	William & Mary
Established	1930	1693
Location	Norfolk	Williamsburg
Conference	Sun Belt	CAA
Students (2019)	24,286	8,617
School Colors	Slate Blue, Silver, & Light Blue	Green & Gold
Nickname	Monarchs	Tribe
Varsity Teams	18	19
Battle for the Silver Mace Wins	2	1

Locations of Old Dominion and William & Mary.

The Old Dominion–William & Mary rivalry (formerly known as the Battle for the Silver Mace in football) refers to the U.S. college rivalry games between the Old Dominion Monarchs of the Sun Belt Conference and the William & Mary Tribe of the Coastal Athletic Association. They are the two largest and most historically tenured NCAA Division I rivals in Hampton Roads, Virginia.

== History ==
Old Dominion University was founded as the Norfolk branch of the College of William & Mary in 1930. The Norfolk Division of William & Mary sports program initiated from football and basketball competitions against local high school teams. In 1941, their football program dissolved because of a $10,000 debt, poor attendance, and a ruling that did not allow freshman players on a branch campus. The Norfolk Division joined the Mason–Dixon Conference in September 1961, becoming its 16th member and competing with other William & Mary divisions as well as smaller NCAA Division II colleges in Virginia.

Old Dominion became independent of William & Mary in 1962 after Governor Albertis Harrison signed legislation dissolving William & Mary's College System. Seven years later, they gained University status and competed as a Division II independent. William & Mary competed in the Southern Conference. Since ODU's declaration, the two schools began competing, despite belonging to separate conferences.

The rivalry intensified from 1991–2013 when both schools were members of the Colonial Athletic Association. Through this period, they competed against each other in 6 conference basketball tournaments and 6 baseball tournaments. They have competed in 26 joint men's soccer classics. Since, Old Dominion has gained the edge over William & Mary in most of their male varsity sports.

== All-time series results ==
Sport	All-time series record	Last result	Next meeting	Source
Baseball	ODU leads 89–56	W&M won 10–8 on March 19, 2025	TBD	
Men's basketball	ODU leads 72–25	W&M won 88–75 on November 30, 2025	TBD	
Women's basketball	ODU leads 64–8	W&M won 51–37 on November 19, 2026	TBD	
Football	ODU leads 2–1	ODU won 41–31 on November 10, 2012	9/1/29 at ODU	
Men's soccer	ODU leads 27–24–9	ODU won 3–1 on September 23, 2025	TBD	

== Basketball ==
=== Men's basketball ===
Old Dominion and William & Mary men's basketball have competed in six total CAA conference tournaments. Old Dominion won 8 conference championships from 1991–2011. Despite the Monarchs' dominance during their CAA tenure, the William and Mary Tribe regathered a series of wins after ODU moved to Conference USA in 2013.

Old Dominion victories	William & Mary victories

No.	Date	Location	Winner	Score
1	February 11, 1969	Williamsburg, VA	Old Dominion	80–65
2	February 16, 1970	Williamsburg, VA	William & Mary	89–80
3	February 16, 1974	Norfolk, VA	William & Mary	70–68
4	January 4, 1975	Williamsburg, VA	Old Dominion	61–55
5	January 13, 1976	Norfolk, VA	Old Dominion	77–73
6	February 5, 1976	Williamsburg, VA	William & Mary	74–61
7	February 5, 1977	Williamsburg, VA	Old Dominion	73–71
8	February 21, 1977	Norfolk, VA	Old Dominion	82–68
9	January 28, 1978	Norfolk, VA	Old Dominion	64–63
10	February 25, 1978	Williamsburg, VA	William & Mary	75–64
11	January 20, 1979	Norfolk, VA	Old Dominion	48–42
12	February 24, 1979	Williamsburg, VA	Old Dominion	57–56
13	January 26, 1980	Norfolk, VA	Old Dominion	60–51
14	February 23, 1980	Williamsburg, VA	Old Dominion	71–69^{OT}
15	February 28, 1980	Hampton, VA	Old Dominion	75–59
16	January 24, 1981	Norfolk, VA	Old Dominion	76–51
17	February 21, 1981	Williamsburg, VA	Old Dominion	60–59
18	January 23, 1982	Williamsburg, VA	William & Mary	60–59^{OT}
19	February 17, 1982	Norfolk, VA	Old Dominion	66–45
20	January 22, 1983	Norfolk, VA	William & Mary	56–50
21	February 12, 1983	Williamsburg, VA	Old Dominion	43–42
22	December 3, 1983	Norfolk, VA	Old Dominion	73–57
23	February 22, 1984	Williamsburg, VA	Old Dominion	71–65
24	December 8, 1984	Williamsburg, VA	Old Dominion	62–57
25	February 20, 1985	Norfolk, VA	Old Dominion	72–58
26	January 15, 1986	Williamsburg, VA	Old Dominion	75–44
27	February 20, 1986	Norfolk, VA	Old Dominion	58–47
28	December 6, 1986	Norfolk, VA	Old Dominion	56–54
29	January 28, 1987	Williamsburg, VA	Old Dominion	60–56
30	November 28, 1987	Williamsburg, VA	Old Dominion	72–69
31	February 4, 1988	Norfolk, VA	Old Dominion	78–69
32	November 26, 1988	Williamsburg, VA	Old Dominion	70–62
33	November 29, 1989	Hampton, VA	Old Dominion	67–62
34	December 5, 1990	Williamsburg, VA	William & Mary	71–63
35	February 1, 1992	Norfolk, VA	Old Dominion	102–92^{OT}
36	February 29, 1992	Williamsburg, VA	Old Dominion	94–85
37	January 30, 1993	Williamsburg, VA	Old Dominion	81–80
38	February 27, 1993	Norfolk, VA	Old Dominion	90–80
39	February 2, 1994	Norfolk, VA	Old Dominion	105–72
40	February 26, 1994	Williamsburg, VA	Old Dominion	94–70
41	March 5, 1994	Richmond, VA	Old Dominion	83–58
42	January 21, 1995	Williamsburg, VA	Old Dominion	83–73
43	February 25, 1995	Norfolk, VA	Old Dominion	60–55
44	January 27, 1996	Williamsburg, VA	Old Dominion	86–82
45	February 21, 1996	Norfolk, VA	Old Dominion	91–86
46	January 22, 1997	Norfolk, VA	William & Mary	61–55
47	February 5, 1997	Williamsburg, VA	William & Mary	80–52
48	March 2, 1997	Richmond, VA	Old Dominion	70–62
49	January 24, 1998	Williamsburg, VA	William & Mary	69–53

No.	Date	Location	Winner	Score
50	February 3, 1998	Norfolk, VA	William & Mary	68–58
51	January 23, 1999	Williamsburg, VA	Old Dominion	65–50
52	February 13, 1999	Norfolk, VA	Old Dominion	70–48
53	January 22, 2000	Williamsburg, VA	Old Dominion	74–60
54	February 12, 2000	Norfolk, VA	Old Dominion	71–62
55	January 10, 2001	Norfolk, VA	Old Dominion	74–54
56	February 17, 2001	Williamsburg, VA	William & Mary	72–62
57	March 3, 2001	Richmond, VA	Old Dominion	53–47^{OT}
58	January 26, 2002	Norfolk, VA	Old Dominion	68–52
59	February 23, 2002	Williamsburg, VA	Old Dominion	81–53
60	January 11, 2003	Norfolk, VA	Old Dominion	76–64
61	February 5, 2003	Williamsburg, VA	William & Mary	69–53
62	January 26, 2004	Williamsburg, VA	William & Mary	86–77
63	February 25, 2004	Norfolk, VA	Old Dominion	79–76
64	December 4, 2004	Norfolk, VA	Old Dominion	69–56
65	February 19, 2005	Williamsburg, VA	Old Dominion	82–66
66	March 5, 2005	Richmond, VA	Old Dominion	64–51
67	January 21, 2006	Williamsburg, VA	Old Dominion	65–56
68	February 9, 2006	Norfolk, VA	Old Dominion	81–60
69	January 24, 2007	Norfolk, VA	Old Dominion	59–44
70	February 24, 2007	Williamsburg, VA	Old Dominion	62–57
71	January 5, 2008	Norfolk, VA	William & Mary	70–61
72	January 26, 2008	Williamsburg, VA	Old Dominion	72–59
73	March 8, 2008	Richmond, VA	William & Mary	63–60
74	January 5, 2009	Williamsburg, VA	Old Dominion	62–50
75	February 25, 2009	Norfolk, VA	Old Dominion	64–63
76	January 23, 2010	Williamsburg, VA	Old Dominion	58–55
77	February 3, 2010	Norfolk, VA	Old Dominion	61–42
78	March 8, 2010	Richmond, VA	Old Dominion	60–53
79	February 9, 2011	Williamsburg, VA	Old Dominion	69–53
80	February 26, 2011	Norfolk, VA	Old Dominion	77–58
81	January 28, 2012	Norfolk, VA	Old Dominion	68–44
82	February 8, 2012	Williamsburg, VA	Old Dominion	70–51
83	December 1, 2012	Williamsburg, VA	William & Mary	71–62
84	February 16, 2013	Norfolk, VA	William & Mary	74–62
85	January 1, 2014	Williamsburg, VA	William & Mary	74–68
86	December 22, 2014	Norfolk, VA	Old Dominion	69–62
87	December 1, 2015	Williamsburg, VA	William & Mary	55–48
88	December 29, 2016	Norfolk, VA	William & Mary	65–54
89	November 25, 2017	Williamsburg, VA	William & Mary	79–77
90	December 5, 2018	Norfolk, VA	Old Dominion	71–53
91	December 3, 2019	Williamsburg, VA	William & Mary	63–46
92	November 28, 2020	Norfolk, VA	Old Dominion	86–78
93	December 7, 2021	Williamsburg, VA	Old Dominion	74–59
94	December 7, 2022	Norfolk, VA	Old Dominion	72–62
95	December 6, 2023	Williamsburg, VA	William & Mary	84–79
96	December 2, 2024	Norfolk, VA	Old Dominion	88–83
97	November 30, 2025	Williamsburg, VA	William & Mary	88–75
Series: Old Dominion leads 72–25

== Football ==
Battle for the Silver Mace
- Old Dominion Monarchs William & Mary Tribe
- Sport: Football
- First meeting: September 18, 2010
- Latest meeting: November 10, 2012
- Next meeting: September 1, 2029
- Trophy: Norfolk Mace

After ODU re-established its football program in 2009, Old Dominion and William & Mary competed as separate schools for the first time on September 18, 2010. The annual CAA divisional battles were coined the ‘Battle for the Silver Mace' with the winner to be presented with a replica of the Norfolk Mace on display at the Chrysler Museum of Art. Old Dominion competed for three matches with the Tribe before leaving the CAA to join Conference USA (FBS) in 2014 as an FCS independent. ODU's move to the FBS inevitability cancelled their future matchups with the Tribe.

Old Dominion announced that the two teams will meet on September 1, 2029.

Old Dominion currently plays at S.B. Ballard Stadium; William & Mary at Zable Stadium.

Old Dominion victories	William & Mary victories	Tie games

No.	Date	Location	Winning team		Losing team		Series
1	September 18, 2010	Foreman Field	#12 (FCS) William & Mary	21	Old Dominion	17	William & Mary 1–0
2	November 12, 2011	Zable Stadium	#11 (FCS) Old Dominion	35	William & Mary	31	Tied 1–1
3	November 10, 2012	Foreman Field	#4 (FCS) Old Dominion	41	William & Mary	31	Old Dominion 2–1
4	September 1, 2029	S.B. Ballard Stadium					

== See also ==
- List of NCAA college football rivalry games
- Capital Cup (Richmond–William & Mary)
- Norfolk State–Old Dominion rivalry
