= Walsingham Academy =

Catholic school in Virginia, US

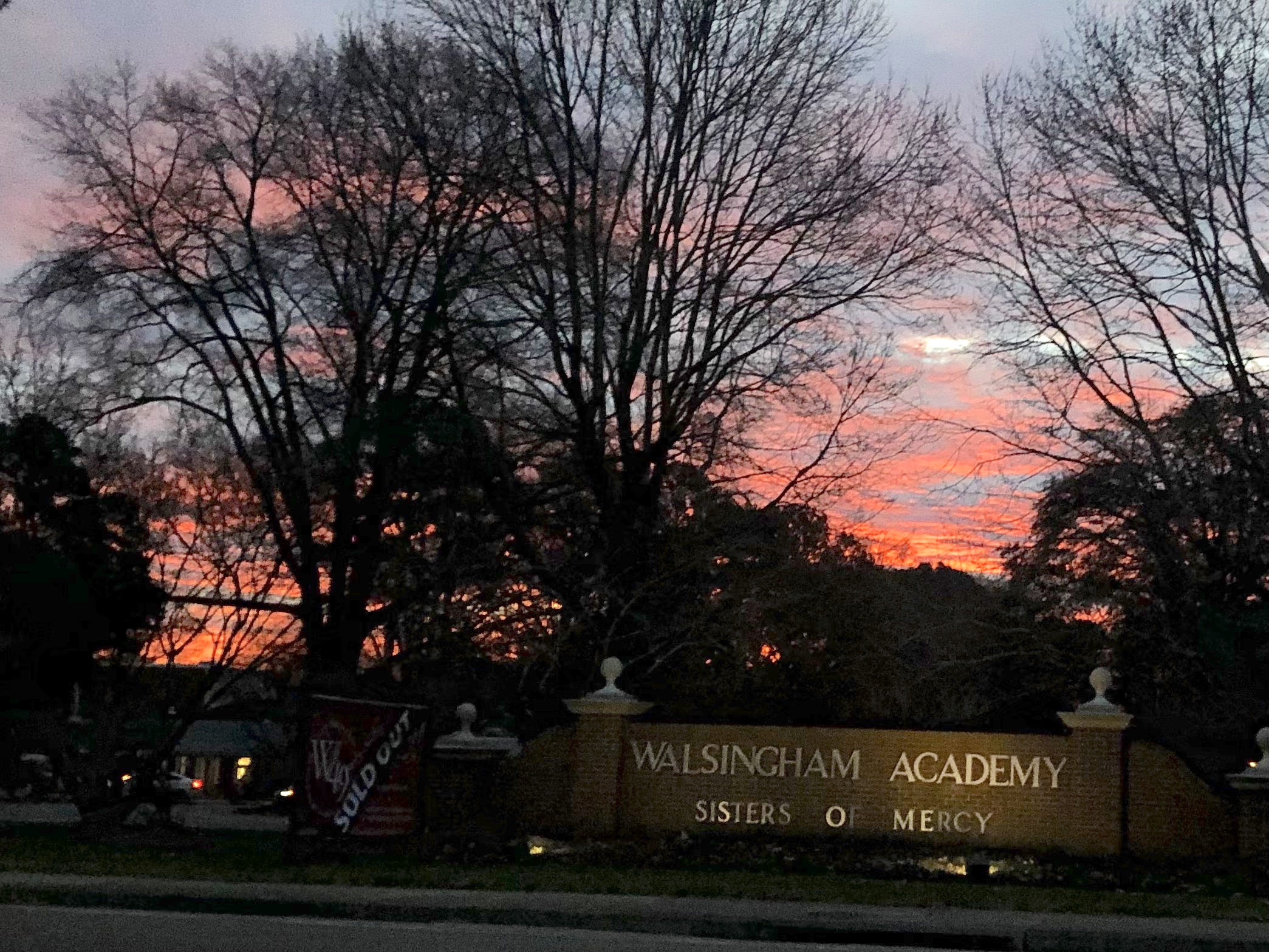

Location
- 1100 Jamestown Road; Williamsburg, Virginia 23187-8702; United States; 37°15′22″N 76°43′39″W

Information
- Type: Private
- Religious affiliations: Catholic Church; Sisters of Mercy
- Established: 1947; 79 years ago
- Authority: Diocese of Richmond
- President: Mary Jeanne Osterle
- Directors: Angie Baker (Upper); Heather Seltzer (Lower)
- Teaching staff: 26.9 (FTE)
- Grades: Pre-K−12
- Gender: Coeducational
- Enrollment: 498 (36 PK, 462 K‍–‍12) (2023−24)
- Student to teacher ratio: 17.2
- Campus size: 30 acres
- Campus type: Small suburban
- Colors: Red; White; Black
- Team name: Trojans
- Rival: Hampton Roads Navigators
- Accreditation: Southern Association of Colleges and Schools
- Affiliations: National Catholic Educational Association (NCEA); National Association of Independent Schools (NAIS)
- Website: www.walsingham.org

Walsingham Academy is an independent Catholic school for Pre-K through twelfth grade located in Williamsburg, Virginia in the United States. It was founded in 1947 and is administered by the Sisters of Mercy of Merion, Pennsylvania. It is within the Diocese of Richmond.

== History ==
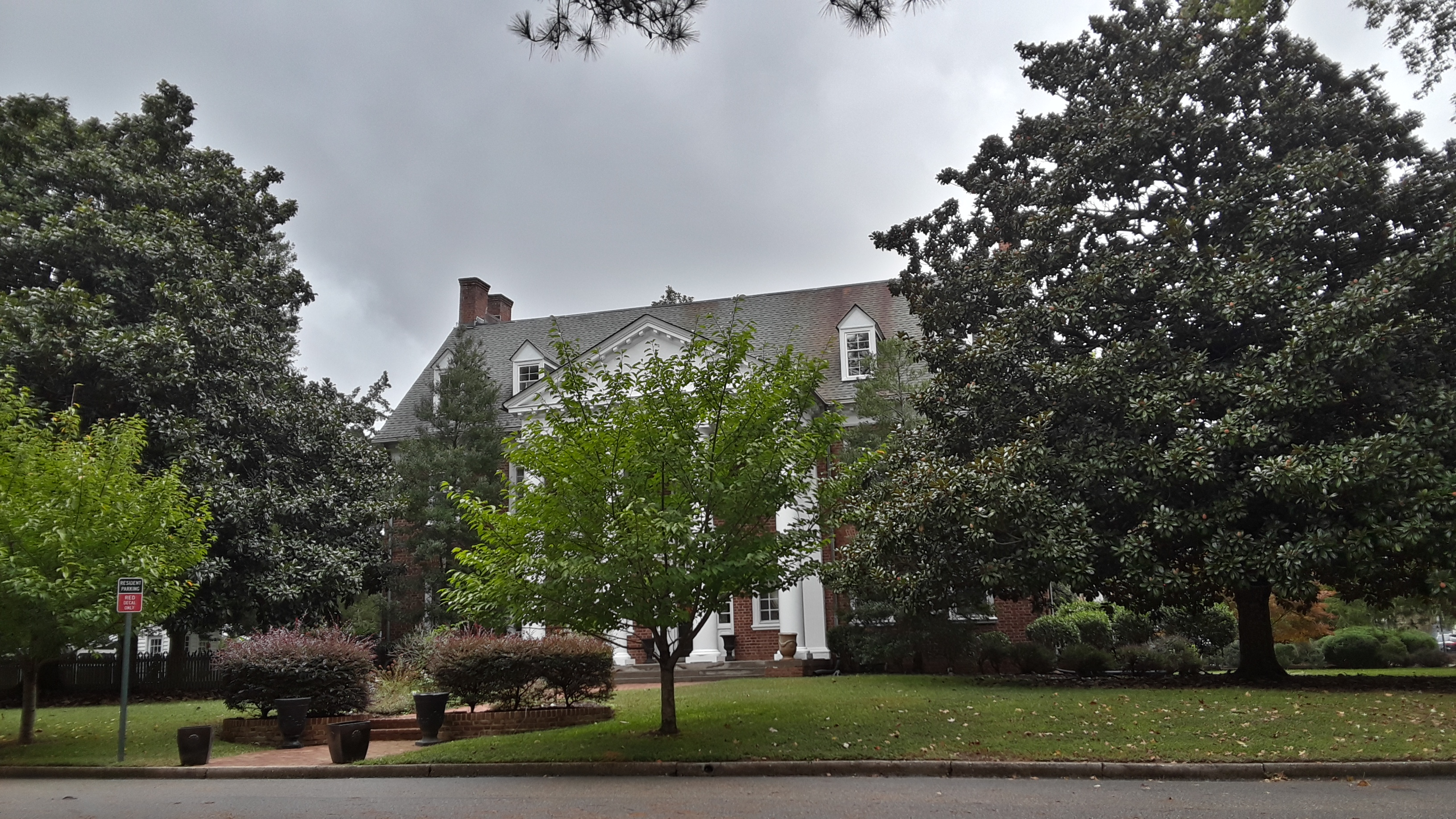
601 College Terrace, former home of the school

Saint Bede parish in Williamsburg purchased a building originally constructed as a fraternity house for students of the College of William & Mary, 601 College Terrace, adjacent to the original location of Saint Bede for use as housing by the USO during the Second World War, in which thousands of soldiers and families stayed during this period of use. On 16 September 1947, the Sisters of Mercy opened Walsingham Academy, a private Catholic school, in this building. After the school's move, the building served as a rectory and is now a privately owned home.

== Athletics ==
The sports teams have won state championship titles in track and field, lacrosse, golf, soccer, basketball, volleyball, swimming, cross country, and sailing. Walsingham Academy won the baseball DIII State Championship in 2018 over Fuqua in 10 innings with a 6 to 5 score, capturing their first ever baseball state championship. The girls' track and field team has won the VISAA Division III State Championship 5 years in a row. Walsingham is considered a baseball powerhouse in coastal Virginia. As of 2024, the varsity baseball team had won six VISAA Division III state championships in a row. The 2024 team consisted of 17 players 8th-12th grades.

Professional baseball player Tanner Schobel attended Walsingham.

== Choir ==
The Walsingham Academy choir performed in Beijing in 2008 and in Rome in 2010. They also performed at the 2012 Summer Olympics in London.

== Notable alumni ==
- Tanner Schobel, MLB shortstop
- Mark Hamill, actor
