= Saint Bede Catholic Church (Williamsburg, Virginia) =

Catholic parish in Virginia, US

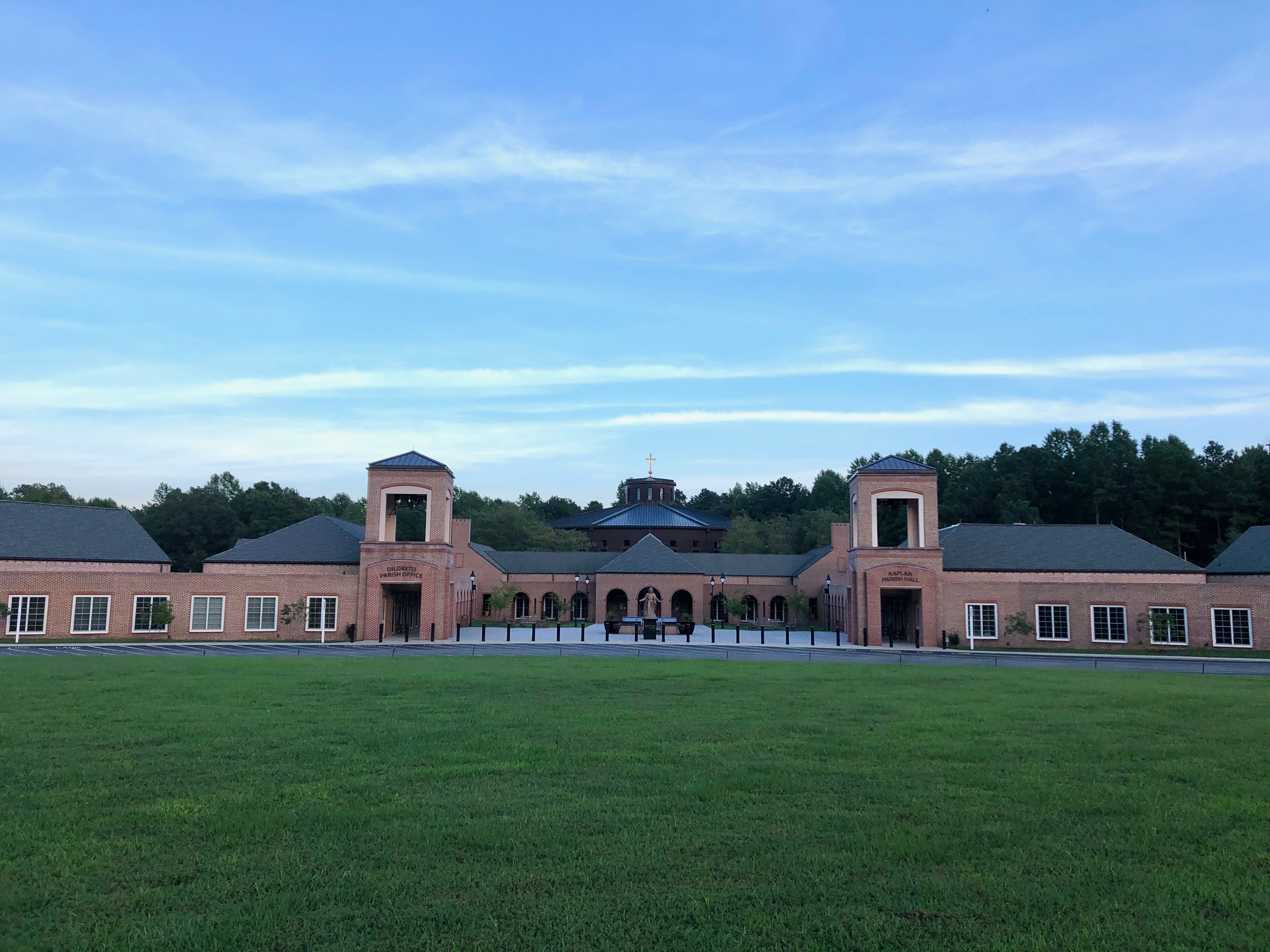
- New church of Saint Bede parish in 2020
- Saint Bede Catholic Church
- 37.262107°N 76.755738°W
- Location: Williamsburg, Virginia
- Country: United States
- Denomination: Catholic Church
- Sui iuris church: Latin Church
- Website: www.bedeva.org

History
- Status: Active
- Founded: 1932
- Founder: Bishop Andrew Brennan
- Dedication: St. Bede; Our Lady of Walsingham

Architecture
- Architect(s): 2003 church: Tom Kerns, Sean Riley

Administration
- Diocese: Diocese of Richmond

Clergy
- Bishop: Barry C. Knestout

Saint Bede Catholic Church in James City County and Williamsburg, Virginia, United States, is a Catholic parish in the Diocese of Richmond. The National Shrine of Our Lady of Walsingham, located adjacent to the campus of the College of William & Mary, is a part of the parish. It was the first Catholic church in Williamsburg.

== History ==
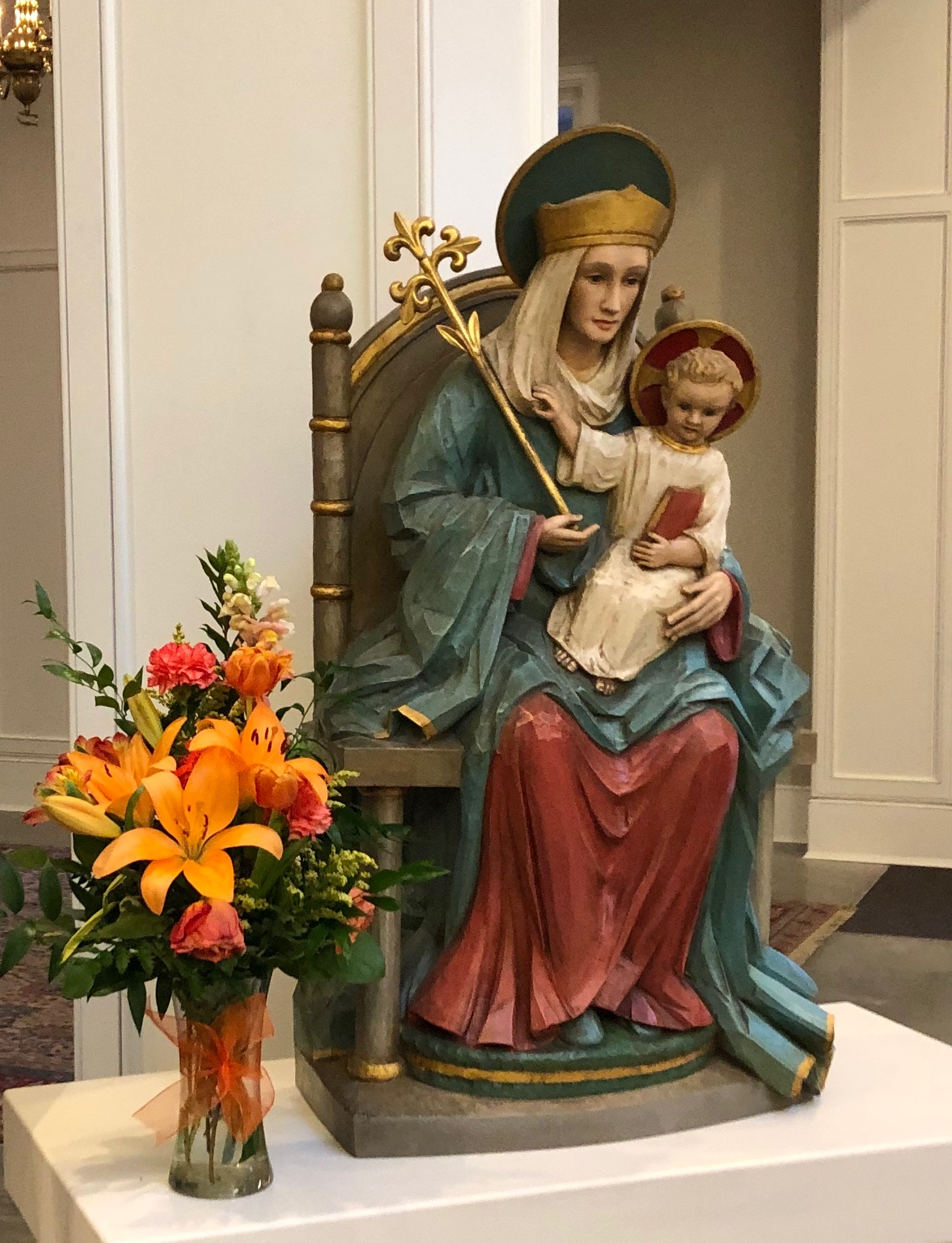
Statue of Our Lady of Walsingham on display in Saint Bede Catholic Church after being temporarily removed during renovations of the Shrine.

=== Early Catholicism on the Peninsula ===
The first known Catholics in the Virginia Peninsula were two Dominican friars, accompanied by 37 Spanish and Portuguese troops and guided by a converted Algonquian, in August 1566. Forty years earlier, the short-lived 1526 San Miguel de Gualdape colony with its Catholic faithful had been established nearby, but its precise location is not known. Ten Spanish Jesuits founded St. Mary's Mission, known more commonly as the Ajacán Mission, in 1570. One posited location for where they disembarked is present-day College Creek. The entire encampment of Spanish missionaries and Native American converts was massacred by members of the Powhatan people in 1571 with the exception of a single convert boy, who was rescued by Spanish forces from Florida the next year.

Nearby Jamestown colony, the first permanent successful English colony in the Americas, was established in 1607. The English Reformation and the Treasons Act 1571 meant that Catholic practice was prohibited, as well as banning Catholics from holding military and civic positions. Despite this, archeological evidence uncovered in 2013 shows personal devotion to Catholicism persisted in the Peninsula's English settlements. Among the devotional articles found at Jamestown was a silver reliquary in the coffin of Captain Gabriel Archer.

=== Saint Bede Parish ===
In September 1923, Mexican immigrant and professor Carlos Eduardo Castañeda arrived at the College of William and Mary to teach Spanish. As the faculty leader of the Gibbons Club, formed on 11 December 1923 and named for prior Bishop of Richmond James Gibbons, he and thirty students agitated for a priest from Newport News to come to Williamsburg in order to fulfill their Sunday Mass obligations. In 1929, $25,000 was given by Margaret Burns to the Diocese of Richmond for "mission churches in Virginia," with the money going towards two lots purchased with the support of College President J. A. C. Chandler. Neighboring the lots to the east was the Bright House and its resident fraternity Kappa Alpha Order, who occupied the structure until 1943. The structure now serves as the college's Alumni House.

In 1932, the Catholic College Chapel was constructed to meet the growing needs of the Catholic students and staff at the college. The chapel was dedicated to Benedictine monk St. Bede the Venerable in October 1932. In 1939, the chapel was dedicated as a parish. On 1 February 1942, Saint Bede's first pastor Fr. Thomas Walsh dedicated the parish to Our Lady of Walsingham. The church was blessed in 1942.

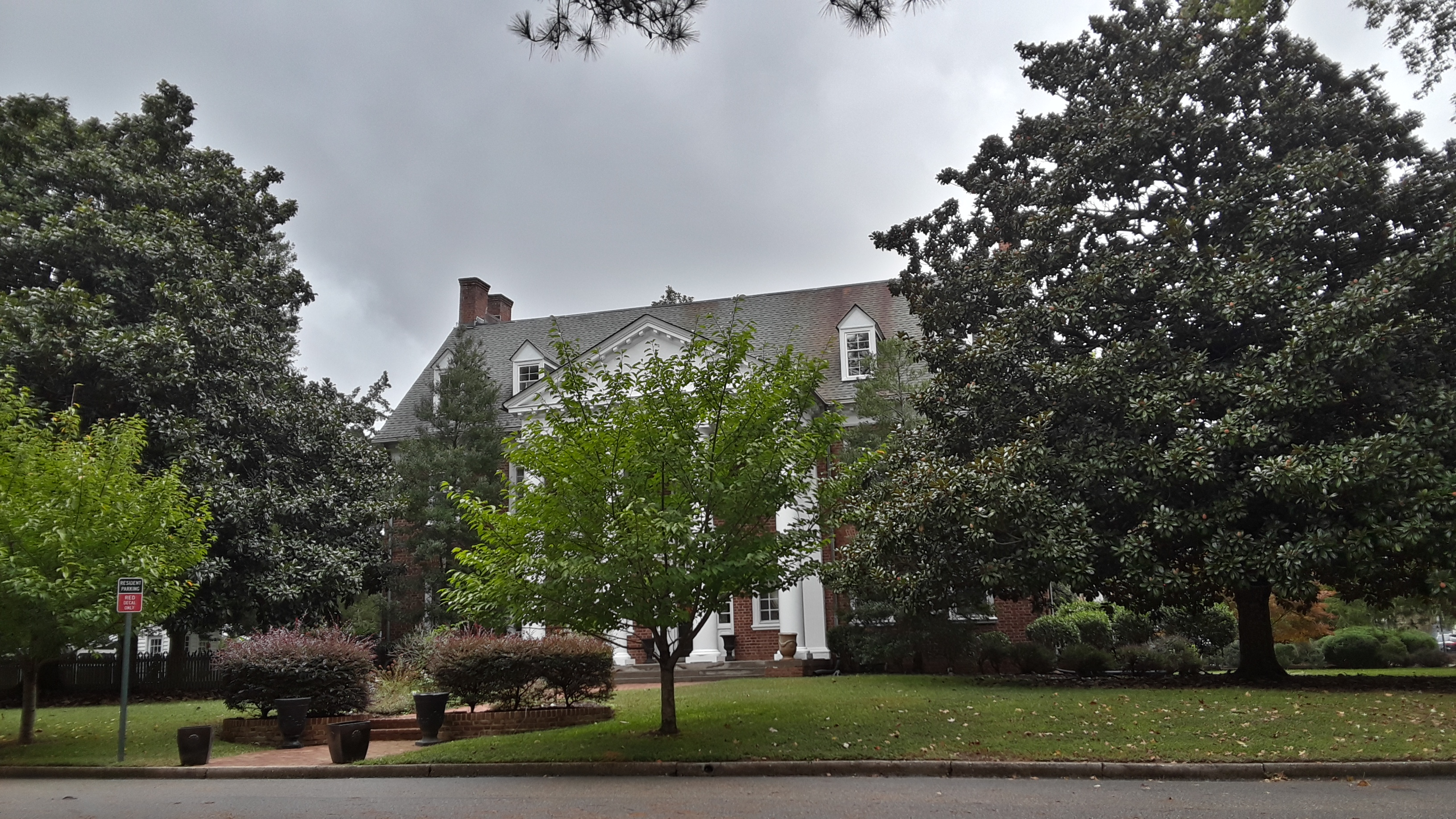
601 College Terrace, a former parish property

The parish purchased a building originally constructed as a fraternity house, 601 College Terrace, adjacent to the original location of Saint Bede for use as housing by the USO, in which thousands of soldiers and families stayed during this period of use. On 16 September 1947, the Sisters of Mercy opened Walsingham Academy, a private Catholic school, in this building. After the school's move, the building served as a rectory and is now a privately owned home.

In 2003, the parish opened a church off of Ironbound Road in Williamsburg, about 1.5 miles from the original chapel. While the title of Saint Bede Catholic Church passed to this new structure, the National Shrine of Our Lady of Walsingham remained a part of and is managed by the parish.

The ordination of Episcopal Diocese of Southern Virginia Bishop Susan Haynes was originally scheduled to take place on 1 February 2020 in Saint Bede. Petitions seeking for Catholic Bishop Barry Knestout to rescind the invitation towards the Episcopalians resulted in international coverage of the controversy. On 17 January 2020, the Episcopal Diocese announced they were moving the ordination to a different church in Williamsburg, citing that the event was "causing dismay and distress" in the Saint Bede community and invoking the warning of St. Paul against "pursuing behavior that might cause problems for others within their community."

== Parish church ==
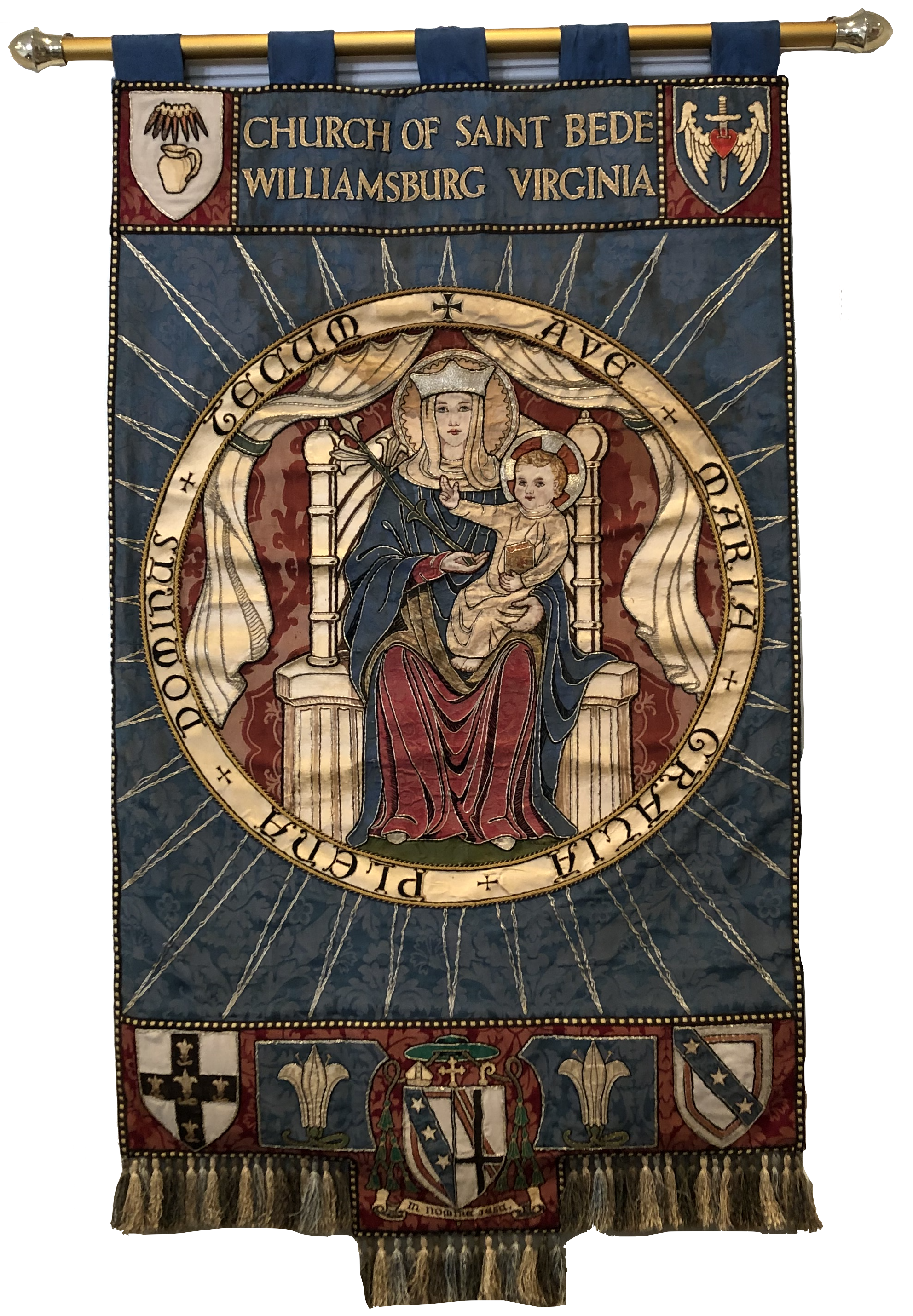
Banner for Saint Bede Church depicting Our Lady of Walsingham and coat of arms for the Diocese of Richmond

The present location of the Saint Bede parish church is composed of a primary church and three wings, two above ground and one beneath the courtyard. The wings were a 37,000 square feet (3,400 m^{2}) addition for the purpose of providing space for fellowship and community events. The wings were completed in 2016 and also house the parish offices for finances and clergy.

The church's pipe organ, originally called Opus 31, was completed in 2005. It was renamed for a former pastor of Saint Bede, Monsignor William H. Carr. The main organ is 32 feet (9.8 m) tall with 183 keys. The organ features 54 ranks and 43 stops with pontifical trumpets in the separated processional organ. Due to noise-dampening foam, there exist certain peculiarities in the organ's sound, such as the least favorable place to hear the organ being directly in front of it.

In 2019, two mosaics were added to the church, flanking the organ. The mosaics depict the communion of saints. Eventually, there are plans to add further art on the 32 other panels that circle the church. The mosaics were produced by the Italian company Barsanti of Pietrasanta and are made of Venetian glass. They are based on paintings by Venezuelan-Italian realist Ramiro Sanchez, whose work has previously been displayed at the nearby Muscarelle Museum of Art.

=== Ministries and services ===
There are over 60 ministries, social groups, and organizations that operate in or with the support of the Saint Bede parish, including:

- Knights of Columbus
- Legion of Mary
- Cub Scouts and Boy Scouts Troops 1932
- Hope Pregnancy Resource Center
- Ancient Order of Hibernians
- Spanish- and English-language catechesis
- House of Mercy, a service for the homeless and economically marginalized that operates in a building adjacent to the Shrine.

== National Shrine of Our Lady of Walsingham ==
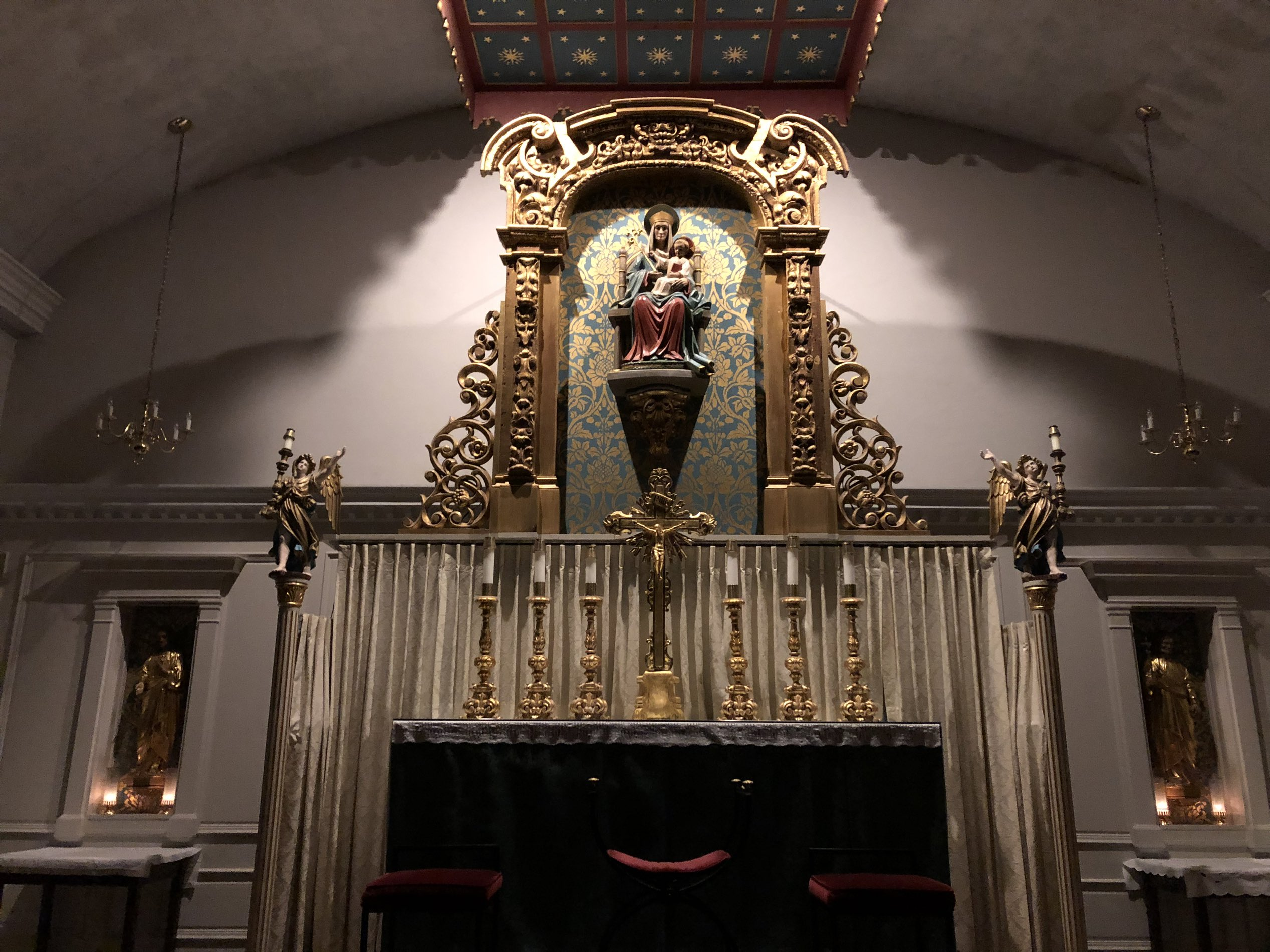
The altar of the National Shrine of Our Lady of Walsingham in September 2019, prior to the 2020 renovations.

Fr. Walsh was appointed the first pastor of Saint Bede and the College Chapel in 1939. With the 2 February 1942–Feast of the Presentation of Christ in the Temple–dedication of the Saint Bede parish to Our Lady of Walsingham, Fr. Walsh commissioned a statue depicting the Marian apparition done in the same style of that present at the Slipper Chapel, itself based on that from the Walsingham Priory. The dedication of Saint Bede church to Our Lady of Walsingham is possibly attributable to Fr. Walsh's personal devotion to the apparition and visit to Europe in 1934 and possible pilgrimage to Walsingham that year. In 2016, the United States Conference of Catholic Bishops recognized the Shrine of Our Lady of Walsingham as the first national shrine in the Diocese of Richmond.

The Williamsburg House of Mercy, a social outreach organization, is located on the campus of the Shrine. Formerly called the Saint Bede Outreach Center, it traces it legacy to the 1960s, when Sister Berenice Eltz, R.S.M. left her teaching position at Walsingham Academy to serve in a social ministry role at Saint Bede parish. For her service in the community, Sister Eltz was sometimes referred to as "the Mother Teresa of Williamsburg." From 2018 to 2020, the House of Mercy was heavily renovated to support the growing need from meal and housing support in the Williamsburg community. The Catholic Student Center is located on the bottom floor of the same building.

Since the opening of the Ironbound church, the Shrine has been referred to as the "Old Saint Bede" and "CCM Chapel" in reference to the Catholic Campus Ministry that operates from it. Several renovations have been undertaken to expand the Shrine and meet ADA compliance standards. In February 2020, the Shrine building was closed for further renovation; however, the adjacent House of Mercy building continued to host Mass for the downtown and college community until the COVID-19 pandemic forced the students off campus and public Masses were cancelled. Renovations were completed during the summer of 2020 before the Shrine fully reopened as COVID-related restrictions were lifted.

For the 24 September Feast of Our Lady of Walsingham, congregants of both Saint Bede and Episcopal Bruton Parish–along with their respective student ministries–participate in an rosary procession carrying the Marian statue from Colonial Williamsburg to the Shrine. At the Shrine, there are ecumenical vespers.

=== Campus ministry ===
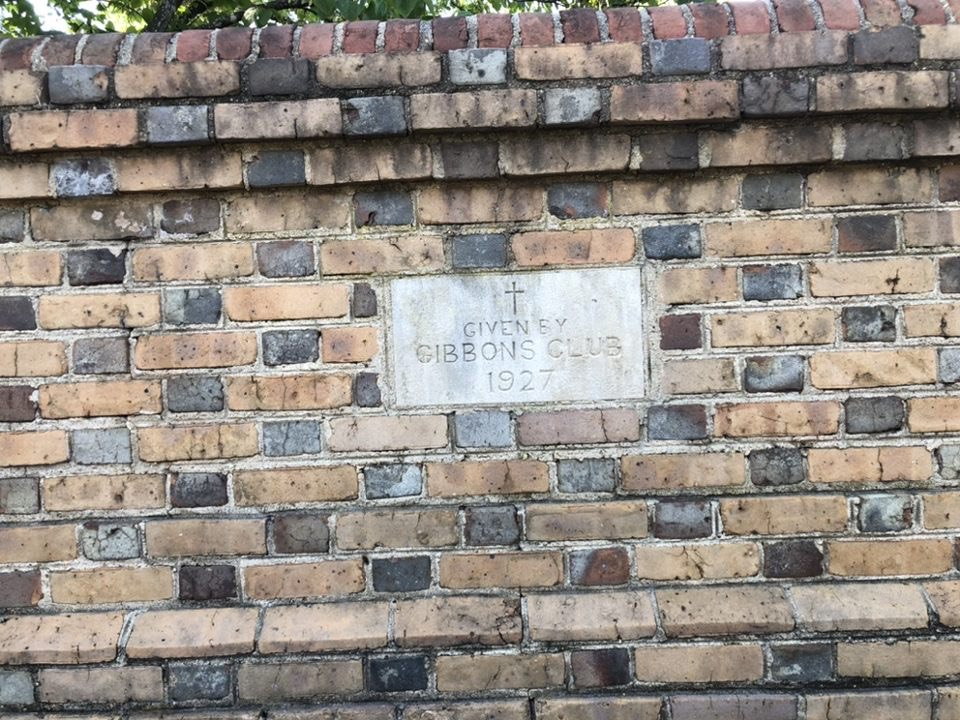
The Gibbons Club sponsored the construction of a portion of the brick wall that rings William & Mary's Old Campus in 1927.

In 1865, the college reported a single Catholic student. By 1939, 114 Catholics attended the college or lived in the nearby community. As of 2019, an average of 225 students attend Sunday Mass at the Shrine, with an average of 25 students attending daily masses at the Shrine or in the Wren chapel.

The Gibbons Club was founded in 1923, later renamed the Newman Club after the establishment of the parish. The Newman Club was later renamed to the Catholic Student Association. Alongside their Episcopalian equivalent, Canterbury, the CSA signed a covenant committing both organizations to ecumenical actions in the Wren Chapel on 24 January 1977. The CSA and Canterbury formerly cooperated in running a chapter of Covenant Players. In the 1990s, the ministry emphasized the role of student leadership and received its first lay campus minister. The student ministry was again renamed to its present title, Catholic Campus Ministry, in line with the names of other campus ministries within the Diocese of Richmond. The Catholic Student Center, located alongside the Shrine, is colloquially known as the "Catacombs" or "Cats."
