= Alumni House (College of William & Mary) =

College of William & Mary building in Virginia, US

Coordinates: 37.27427°N 76.71428°W

Alumni house
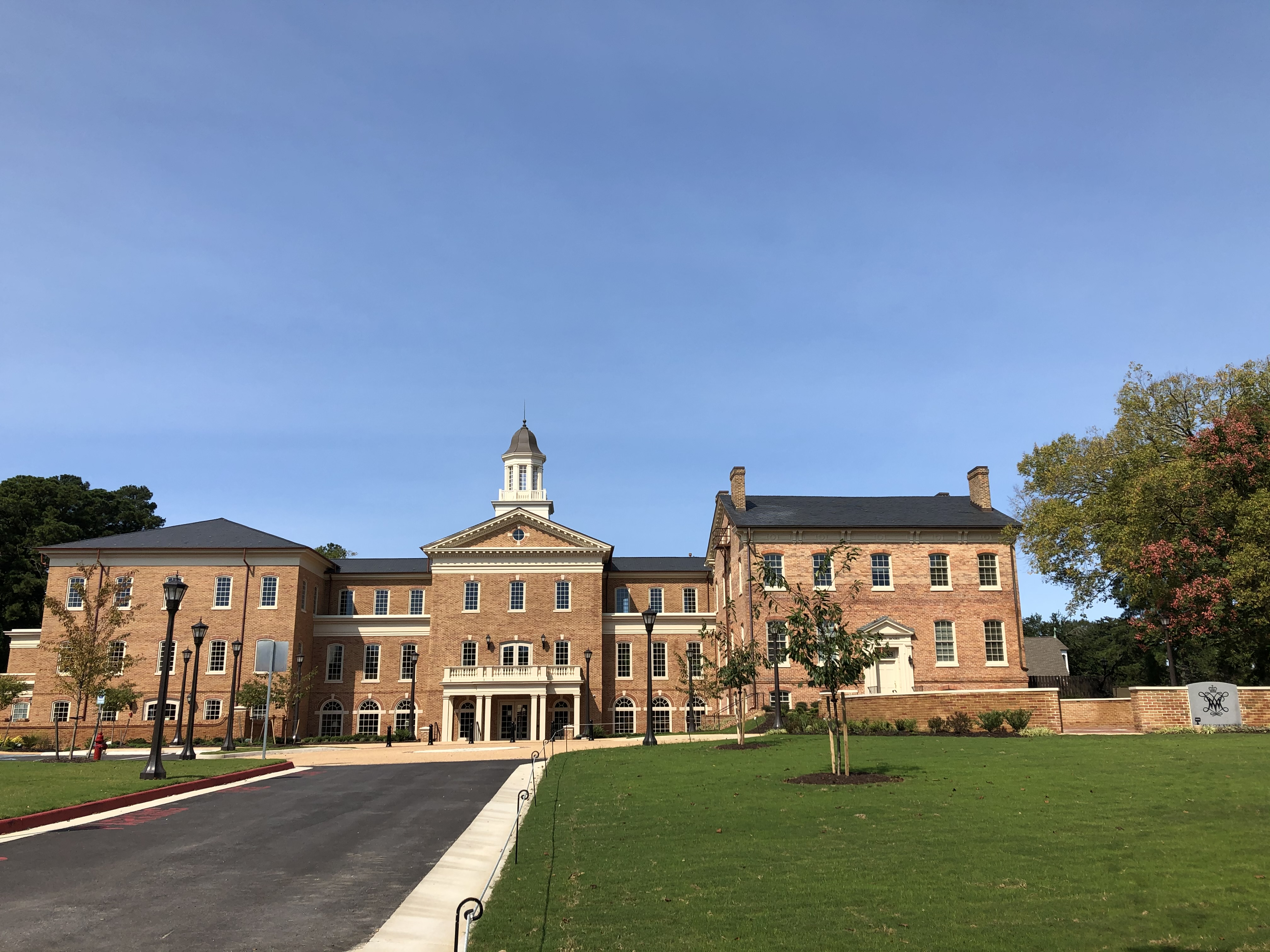
- Alumni House, 2020.
- Interactive map of the Alumni house area

General information
- Location: Williamsburg, Virginia, United States of America
- Construction started: 1850s (original); 2018 (reconstruction)
- Completed: 2020
- Owner: College of William and Mary in Virginia

The Alumni House, formerly known as the Bright House, is a 19th-century building located on the College of William & Mary's campus in the middle of historic Williamsburg, Virginia. The home was originally situated on a farm called "New Hope" owned by Samuel Bright and his family and at that time on the outskirts of the town.

== History ==
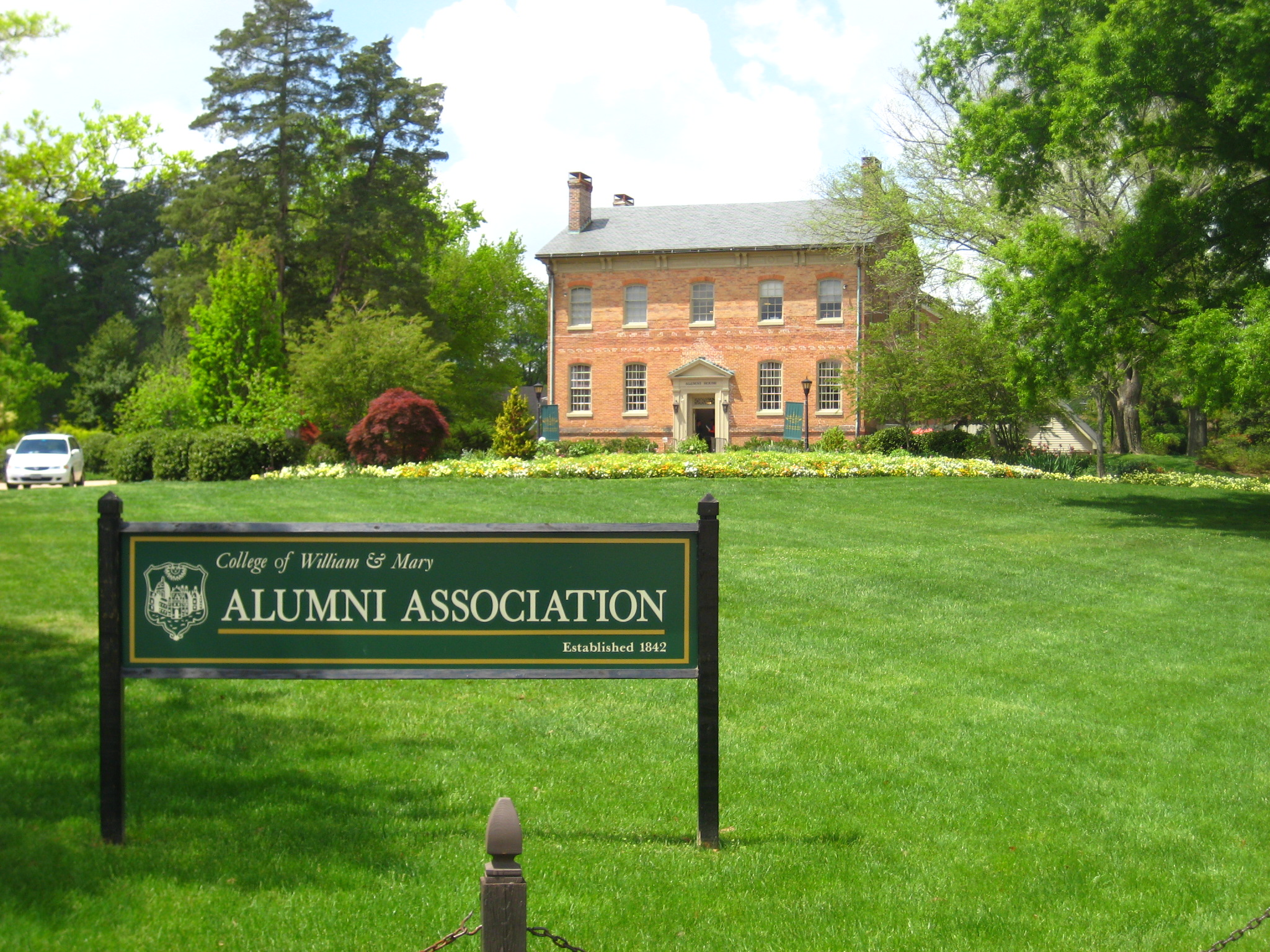
The Alumni House prior to 2018-2020 renovations.

At one time original portions of the house were thought to date back to 1871, but recent research has pushed the date back some years. A watercolor of the campus was discovered, however, which revealed that the Alumni House is probably an antebellum structure. "A long-lost panoramic watercolor of Williamsburg painted by a Union mapmaker, Robert Knox Sneden," was found and dates from August 1862 after the Battle of Williamsburg during the American Civil War. Some of Sneden’s watercolors have proven to be inaccurate, as may be the case of this watercolor, which was drawn several years later from a sketch Sneden had prepared when on campus in 1862. The Italianate towers in his sketch of the college building are accurate, but Sneden misnamed The Brafferton and the President's House, also on the front campus, apparently confusing them with the front buildings at the Governor's Palace. At the far right of the Sneden watercolor is possibly the Bright House. On the two-story building Sneden drew a cupola in the Italianate style then in vogue (as in the 1859 version of William & Mary's main college building), but the cupola might indeed have been an embellishment. If the home depicted is the Bright House then the building was probably built sometime in the 1850s. The Alumni House would be one of only several buildings on the College's campus to have witnessed, first-hand, a Civil War battle in Williamsburg.

During the house’s existence, it has been home to the William & Mary Kappa Alpha Order fraternity from 1925-1943. The College purchased the home in 1946 and until the late 1960s was the home to some faculty members. By that time the building's interior was converted into apartments. The Bright House became the Alumni House in 1972 after the Society of the Alumni, (now the W&M Alumni Association) embarked on a campaign to raise funds for renovations. Despite the modifications, the house's exterior still retains a mid-19th century identity. The Alumni House was expanded and renovated with celebrations marking the new facility held on Homecoming on Oct. 28, 1995.

Construction began in 2018 and concluded in 2020 on a major addition to Alumni House that added 35,000 square feet to the building's nearly 20,000 square feet. The new facility, however, retains and preserved the character of the 19th-century home. There is a new entrance and reception area, event space to accommodate up to 800 people, a lounge and business center and outdoor modifications such as a new terrace, enclosing garden area and plaza. The new construction left the original structure in place, treating the original house as the northern wing of the completed building.

The House is sometimes used to host meetings pertaining to public interest. James City County, York County and the City of Williamsburg have utilized the building.

Currently directly outside, facing Zable Stadium, is the Elizabeth and T.C. Clarke Memorial Plaza, which is paved with hundreds of engraved bricks that commemorate special people, times and places in William & Mary history. The Plaza can seat 250 people for catered events.

== See also ==
- National Shrine of Our Lady of Walsingham, adjacent Catholic shrine
- List of College of William & Mary alumni
