= Flat Hat Club =

Secret society at William & Mary

F.H.C. Society
- (The Flat Hat Club)
- Flat Hat Club medal, c. 1750–1770
- Founded: November 17, 1750; 276 years ago College of William & Mary
- Type: Secret
- Affiliation: Independent
- Status: Active
- Scope: Local
- Motto: Stabilitas et Fides "Stability and Faith"
- Chapters: 1
- Headquarters: Williamsburg, Virginia; United States

The F.H.C. Society, also known by its backronym "The Flat Hat Club", is a collegiate secret society and honor society at the College of William & Mary in Williamsburg, Virginia. Founded in 1750, the F.H.C. Society is the United States' oldest collegiate secret society. The F.H.C. Society remains active; while its operations remain highly secretive, the society's activity is apparent through campus philanthropy.

Early in the 21st century, the education section of The New York Times profiled America's oldest university clubs and societies and included a letter, now housed in the archives at Swem Library, which Thomas Jefferson wrote to Thomas McAuley, mentioning Jefferson's membership in the F.H.C.

== History ==
=== 18th century ===
The society was founded as the F.H.C. Society at the College of William & Mary in Williamsburg, Virginia on November 11, 1750. It was organized for "charity, friendship, and science". F.H.C. met regularly for discussion and fellowship, especially at the Raleigh Tavern.

William & Mary alumnus and third American president Thomas Jefferson may be the most famous member of the F.H.C. Society. Late in life Jefferson wrote, "When I was a student of Wm. & Mary College of this state, there existed a society called the F.H.C. society, confined to the number of six students only, of which I was a member. Still, it had no useful object, nor do I know whether it now exists."

F.H.C. Society is believed to be the precursor of Phi Beta Kappa. A second Latin-letter fraternity, the P.D.A. Society (publicly known as "Please Don't Ask"), was founded at William and Mary in March 1773, in imitation of the F.H.C. Society. John Heath, a student at William and Mary who in 1776 sought but was refused admission to the P.D.A., later established the first Greek-letter fraternity, the Phi Beta Kappa Society.

The student members of the F.H.C. suspended the club's activities in 1781, probably due to the suspension of academic exercises at the college as the contending armies of the American Revolution approached Williamsburg during the Yorktown campaign.

=== 20th and 21st centuries ===
"The memory of this fraternity had entirely died out at William and Mary, but [after 1909, there was a] discovery of certain manuscript material in the correspondence of St. George Tucker, who was a student of the College in 1772. ... These manuscripts consist of (1) a letter of Mr. Jefferson, written to John D. Taylor, of Maryland, giving some account of the club at the College, stating that he was a member ... [;] (2) a list of the books described as compiled for the club's library, in 1772, by Rev. Thomas Gwatkin, Professor of Mathematics; (3) the credentials of Robert Baylor as a member in abbreviated Latin." Thus, the club possessed a small library.

The F.H.C. Society was revived on September 30, 1920, by twelve undergraduate men and four professors who originally organized as the Spotswood Club, which was formed in 1916. It differed markedly from the original society, a fraternity of six undergraduate men with alumnus members in urbe – that is, "in town", having graduated from the university. This society operated largely as a collegiate honorary society whose members were not secret and were published in the college's yearbook and newspapers. It suspended its activities in 1943 due to World War II.

The third revival of the F.H.C. Society came in May 1972. Remaining an all-male secret society, consisting of twelve undergraduate men. In recent years, an additional six members were added. Most of its activities remain secret within the university. Members receive medals of distinction upon graduation from William and Mary, showing their membership. Contrary to the practice of some similar societies, alumni may disclose their membership after graduation.

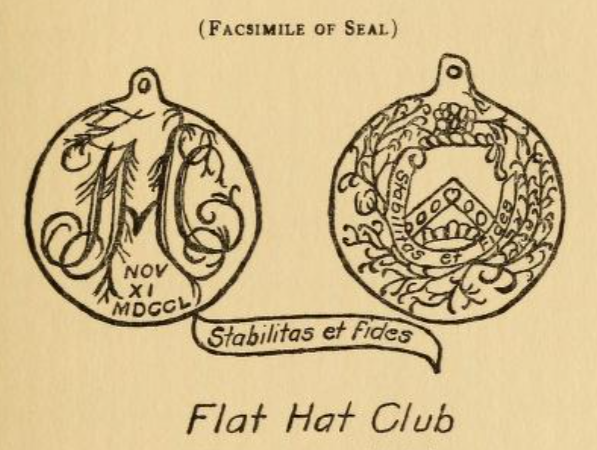
Flat Heat Club seal, depicted on its membership medal

== Symbols ==
The initials of the F.H.C. Society stands for a secret Latin phrase, likely Fraternitas, Humanitas, et Cognitio or Fraternitas Humanitas Cognitioque, two renderings of "brotherhood, humanity, and knowledge".

The group became publicly known by the backronym "Flat Hat Club" in probable allusion to the mortarboard caps then commonly worn by all students at the college (now worn at graduation by students at most American universities).

The F.H.C. brothers devised and employed a secret handshake, issued certificates of membership, and wore a silver membership medal. The front of the medal featured an F.H.C. monogram with the club's date of formation, November 11, 1750. The medal's back features the club's motto surrounding its coat of arms, consisting of a shield with a chevron and clasped hands; above the shield is a rose. Its motto is Stabilitas et Fiedes, Latin for "Stability and Faith".

The organization's name has been used by the campus newspaper, The Flat Hat, since 1911, and as a campus literary magazine, Flat Hat Magazine, since 2019. The newspaper also uses the club's motto. A 1928 issue of The Flat Hat reports that members of the Flat Hat Club were directly responsible for the creation of the newspaper.

== Notable members ==
The following is a list of known notable members of the Flat Hat Club.

- John Stewart Bryan, president of the College of William & Mary
- J. A. C. Chandler, president of the College of William & Mary
- James Innes, Attorney General of Virginia and member of the Virginia House of Delegates
- Thomas Gwatkin, cleric and professor at the College of William & Mary
- Thomas Jefferson, Founding Father and President of the United States
- Bathurst Peachy, head baseball coach for the College of William & Mary
- Edmund Randolph, Founding Father of the United States and the 7th Governor of Virginia
- Earl Gregg Swem, historian, bibliographer, and librarian at the Library of Congress and Virginia State Library
- St. George Tucker, judge of the General Court of Virginia and the Court of Appeals, law professor at the College of William & Mary
- George Wythe, Founding Fathers of the United States, delegate to the Continental Congress, Attorney General of Virginia, Speaker of the Virginia House of Delegates, and mayor of Williamsburg, Virginia

== See also ==
- Collegiate secret societies in North America
- College of William & Mary secret societies
- History of the College of William & Mary
