= Chancellor of the College of William & Mary =

Ceremonial office

Chancellor of College of William & Mary
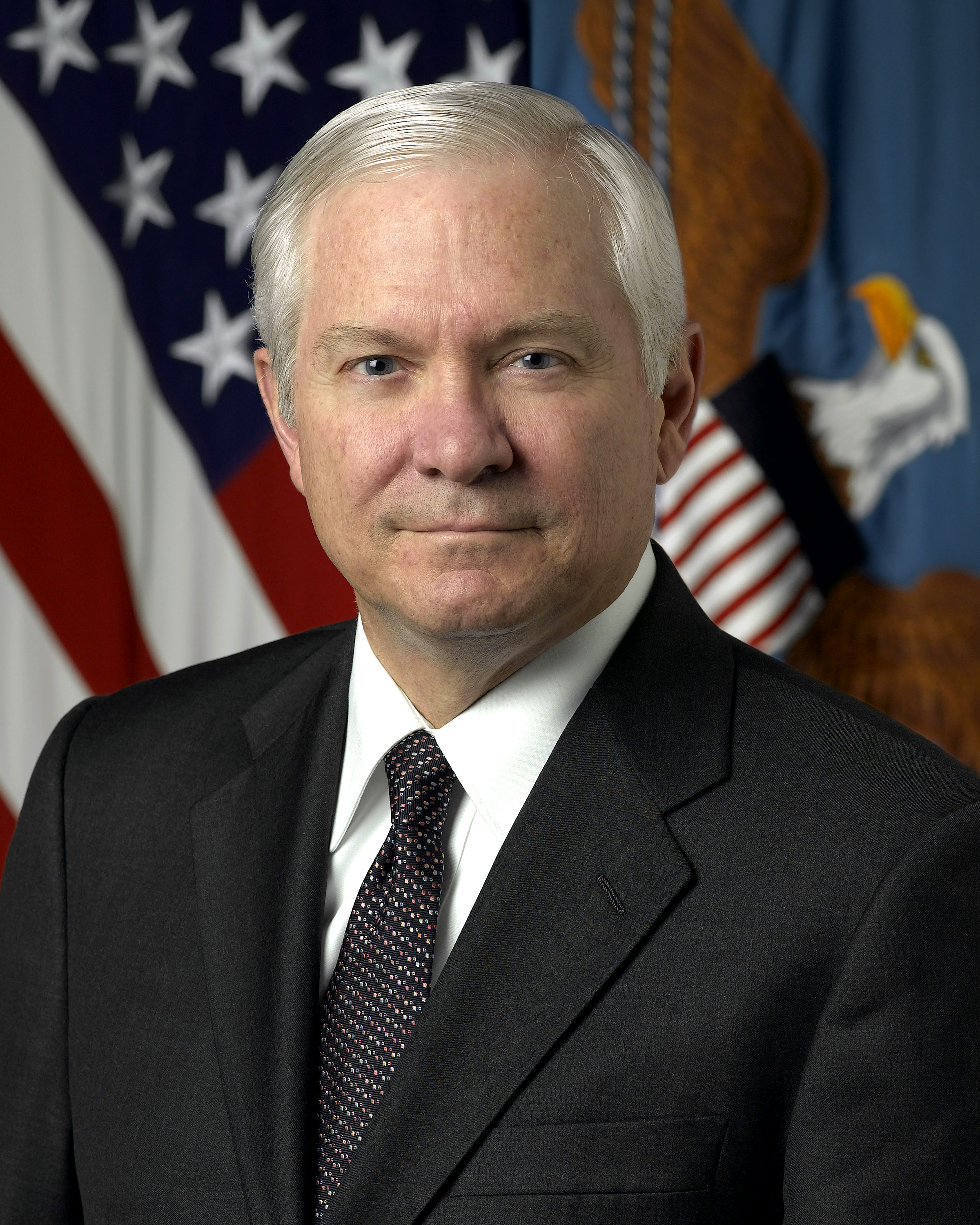
- Incumbent; Robert Gates since February 3, 2012
- College of William & Mary
- Type: Chancellor
- Formation: 1693
- First holder: Henry Compton, Bishop of London

The chancellor of the College of William & Mary is the ceremonial head of the College of William & Mary in Williamsburg, Virginia, United States, chosen by the university's Board of Visitors. The office was created by the college's Royal Charter, which stipulated that the chancellor would serve a seven-year term. Henry Compton, Bishop of London, was named in the Charter as the college's first chancellor. Associate Justice of the Supreme Court of the United States Sandra Day O'Connor served as chancellor from 2005 until 2012 when Robert Gates assumed the office. He was installed as chancellor on February 3, 2012. He was re-invested for a second term on February 8, 2019. He was re-invested for a third term on February 6, 2026.

== Colonial period ==
The college's charter, granted in 1693 by King William III and Queen Mary II, provided for the office of chancellor, and during the colonial period the chancellor served as the college's representative to the British Crown and the British government. Many of the pre-Revolutionary War chancellors were either Bishops of London or Archbishops of Canterbury and served as a link between the college and the government in London. They would also help recruit faculty to come to Virginia and teach at the college. However, none of these chancellors ever set foot in Williamsburg.

With the outbreak of the Revolutionary War and the Declaration of Independence, the ties between the College of William & Mary and England were severed, leaving the position of chancellor vacant until 1788. Other ties with Britain, such as the money from the Brafferton Estate (in Ireland) which funded the Indian School, were also severed.

== Post-independence ==
Thomas Jefferson wished to alter the office of the chancellor after the American Revolution. In 1776, Jefferson proposed a system that included three chancellors, elected from the leading men of Virginia and who would have the power to remove faculty, in place of a single chancellor. His reforms did not pass, and the office of chancellor remained vacant until 1788.

George Washington served as the next chancellor, an office he held from 1788 until his death in 1799. Washington was asked because the president of the college, Bishop James Madison, thought that the heritage of the position required a national figure to occupy it. The office again remained vacant until another President of the United States, John Tyler, was appointed as chancellor, serving from 1859 until 1862. Tyler was an alumnus of the college and his son, Lyon Gardiner Tyler, would later serve as its president.

In the late 19th and early 20th centuries, the office of chancellor was intermittently occupied. People such as Hugh Blair Grigsby, John Stewart Bryan, and Colgate Darden served as chancellor and ended their terms without a direct successor.

For two years, Alvin Duke Chandler was a very different kind of chancellor. From 1960 to 1962, Chandler presided over The Colleges of William & Mary, a five campus system that included William & Mary, the Richmond Professional Institute, the Norfolk Division of the College of William & Mary, Christopher Newport College, and Richard Bland College. When the system was disbanded in 1962, Chandler became the honorary chancellor until 1974.

After a 12-year vacancy, Warren Burger was chosen to be the twentieth chancellor of the College of William & Mary in 1986. Burger had numerous associations with Williamsburg and William & Mary, receiving an honorary degree and delivering the commencement address in 1973, speaking at Law Day in 1979, and helping to found the National Center for State Courts in Williamsburg in 1976. The personal and professional papers of Chief Justice Burger are held by the Special Collections Research Center and will be opened to the public on December 1, 2033, ten years after the death of Sandra Day O'Connor, the last surviving member of the Burger Court.

After the retirement of Warren Burger, the office has been held by Margaret Thatcher, Henry Kissinger, and Sandra Day O'Connor. Former Secretary of Defense Robert Gates (an alumnus of the college) took over the position in February 2012.

== Functions ==
The chancellor serves as the ceremonial head of the college and is elected by the Board of Visitors of the College of William & Mary. The Board of Visitors, led by the rector of the college, determines university policy, levies the fees charged for tuition, and appoints a president of the college to serve as chief executive officer and manage the day-to-day affairs of the university. The chancellor is present for major campus events, including commencement and Charter Day, celebrated every February on the anniversary of the college's founding by King William and Queen Mary. During major ceremonies, the chancellor wears the robe, badge, and chain of office.

== List of chancellors ==
The following persons have served as chancellor of the College of William & Mary.

Colonial era
#	Name	Years
1	Henry Compton	1693–1700
2	Thomas Tenison	1700–1707
3	Henry Compton	1707–1713
4	John Robinson	1714–1721
5	William Wake	1721–1729
6	Edmund Gibson	1729–1736
7	William Wake	1736–1737
8	Edmund Gibson	1737–1748
9	Thomas Sherlock	1749–1761
10	Thomas Hayter	1762
11	Charles Wyndham	1762–1763
12	Philip York	1764
13	Richard Terrick	1764–1776

Post-colonial era
#	Name	Years
1	George Washington	1788–1799
2	John Tyler	1859–1862
3	Hugh Blair Grigsby	1871–1881
4	John Stewart Bryan	1942–1944
5	Colgate Darden	1946–1947
6	Alvin Duke Chandler	1962–1974
7	Warren E. Burger	1986–1993
8	Margaret Thatcher	1993–2000
9	Henry Kissinger	2000–2005
10	Sandra Day O'Connor	2005–2012
11	Robert M. Gates	2012–
