= Old Dominion–VCU men's basketball rivalry =

Sports rivalry

ODU–VCU men's basketball rivalry
- ODU Monarchs VCU Rams
- Sport: College basketball
- First meeting: February 5, 1969; ODU 101 – VCU 69
- Latest meeting: October 17, 2026; VCU 71 – ODU 57

Statistics
- Total meetings: 97
- All-time series: VCU leads 54–44
- Largest victory: ODU by 32 on Feb 5, 1969; VCU by 32 on Dec 29, 1983
- Longest win streak: VCU, 10 (2001–2005)
- Current win streak: VCU, 3 (2019–present)

Locations of Old Dominion and VCU

The Old Dominion–VCU men's basketball rivalry is a men's college basketball rivalry between the VCU Rams of Virginia Commonwealth University and the Old Dominion Monarchs of Old Dominion University. This rivalry is said to be one of the most competitive among middle level Division-I basketball programs.

== Background ==
College Comparison
	Old Dominion	VCU
Founded	1930	1838
Location	Norfolk, VA	Richmond, VA
Conference	Sun Belt	Atlantic 10
Students	24,125	32,303
School colors		
Nickname	Monarchs	Rams
Mascot	Big Blue	Rodney the Ram
Arena	Chartway Arena	Siegel Center
Capacity	8,639	7,617

The rivalry between Virginia Commonwealth University and Old Dominion University exists primarily because of the similar histories of the two Virginia public universities. Both schools have historic affiliations with The College of William & Mary (W&M). One of VCU's predecessor institutions, the Richmond Professional Institute (RPI), became part of W&M in 1925. ODU was founded in 1930 as the Norfolk Division of W&M. In addition, from 1960 to 1962, both RPI and the Norfolk Division were part of The Colleges of William & Mary, a short-lived university system consisting of W&M and its affiliated institutions.

VCU, located in the state capital of Richmond, is just 90 miles down Interstate 64 from ODU, located in Norfolk. Both schools are major research universities located in an urban environment. They are also both very large universities consisting of a diverse student body; with students primarily coming from middle-class backgrounds.

Throughout much of the history of the rivalry, ODU and VCU had been in the same conference, most recently the Colonial Athletic Association. This ended after the 2011–12 season when VCU joined the Atlantic 10 Conference. ODU left the CAA for Conference USA a year later.

Rick Kiefner, a 1969 graduate of ODU, believed the animosity and rivalry may have started due to an incident during the 1970 season. A group of ODU fans, including Kiefner, had chartered a bus to travel to a VCU game in Richmond, but, instead of the tickets they had paid for, received a box of screws in the mail.

== Game results ==
Old Dominion victories	VCU victories

No.	Date	Location	Winner	Score
1	February 5, 1969	Norfolk Arena	Old Dominion	101–69
2	December 10, 1969	Franklin Street Gym	Old Dominion	93–82
3	January 21, 1970	Norfolk Arena	Old Dominion	94–90
4	February 10, 1971	Franklin Street Gym	VCU	79–71
5	February 27, 1971	ODU Fieldhouse	Old Dominion	98–85
6	December 17, 1977	Richmond Coliseum	VCU	73–67
7	February 22, 1978	Hampton Coliseum	VCU	73–72
8	December 30, 1978	Franklin Street Gym	Old Dominion	70–68
9	January 17, 1979	Norfolk Scope	VCU	95–87
10	February 15, 1979	Richmond Coliseum	Old Dominion	72–71^{OT}
11	January 22, 1980	Richmond Coliseum	Old Dominion	68–64
12	February 18, 1980	Norfolk Scope	Old Dominion	76–75
13	December 13, 1980	Richmond Coliseum	VCU	65–56
14	December 30, 1980	Richmond Coliseum	VCU	61–44
15	February 10, 1981	Richmond Coliseum	VCU	75–64
16	December 22, 1981	Richmond Coliseum	VCU	61–55
17	January 30, 1982	Norfolk Scope	Old Dominion	61–58
18	December 29, 1982	Richmond Coliseum	Old Dominion	90–85
19	January 11, 1983	Hampton Coliseum	Old Dominion	67–62
20	December 29, 1983	Richmond Coliseum	VCU	83–51
21	January 28, 1984	Norfolk Scope	Old Dominion	56–54^{OT}
22	February 25, 1984	Richmond Coliseum	Old Dominion	57–55
23	February 16, 1985	Richmond Coliseum	VCU	90–71
24	February 23, 1985	Norfolk Scope	VCU	78–66
25	March 3, 1985	Hampton Coliseum	VCU	87–82
26	December 21, 1985	Richmond Coliseum	Old Dominion	67–55
27	January 18, 1986	Norfolk Scope	Old Dominion	50–49
28	February 13, 1986	Richmond Coliseum	Old Dominion	61–56
29	January 8, 1987	Norfolk Scope	VCU	77–64
30	February 14, 1987	Richmond Coliseum	VCU	78–66
31	January 16, 1988	Norfolk Scope	Old Dominion	71–67
32	February 20, 1988	Richmond Coliseum	VCU	82–77
33	March 6, 1988	Richmond Coliseum	VCU	91–69
34	January 14, 1989	Richmond Coliseum	VCU	101–93^{OT}
35	January 23, 1989	Norfolk Scope	Old Dominion	99–87
36	December 21, 1989	Richmond Coliseum	Old Dominion	77–67
37	January 20, 1990	Norfolk Scope	VCU	55–49
38	February 24, 1990	Richmond Coliseum	Old Dominion	80–64
39	January 12, 1991	Norfolk Scope	VCU	62–60
40	February 2, 1991	Richmond Coliseum	VCU	60–58
41	December 7, 1991	Norfolk Scope	VCU	98–83
42	December 29, 1991	Richmond Coliseum	Old Dominion	67–66
43	December 12, 1992	Hampton Coliseum	Old Dominion	81–65
44	March 19, 1993	Norfolk Scope	Old Dominion	74–68
45	January 31, 1994	Hampton Coliseum	Old Dominion	79–74
46	February 6, 1995	Hampton Coliseum	VCU	81–67
47	January 6, 1996	Norfolk Scope	VCU	85–70
48	February 3, 1996	Richmond Coliseum	VCU	85–76^{OT}
49	January 18, 1997	Richmond Coliseum	Old Dominion	82–65
50	February 15, 1997	Norfolk Scope	Old Dominion	75–70

No.	Date	Location	Winner	Score
51	January 17, 1998	Norfolk Scope	VCU	61–55
52	January 31, 1998	Richmond Coliseum	Old Dominion	69–56
53	January 9, 1999	Richmond Coliseum	Old Dominion	82–72
54	January 30, 1999	Norfolk Scope	Old Dominion	76–72
55	February 27, 1999	Richmond Coliseum	Old Dominion	66–49
56	January 5, 2000	Siegel Center	VCU	73–67^{OT}
57	January 29, 2000	Norfolk Scope	Old Dominion	72–69
58	January 20, 2001	ODU Fieldhouse	Old Dominion	77–65
59	February 24, 2001	Siegel Center	VCU	74–53
60	January 19, 2002	ODU Fieldhouse	VCU	79–77^{OT}
61	February 9, 2002	Siegel Center	VCU	73–66
62	March 2, 2002	Richmond Coliseum	VCU	58–54
63	January 4, 2003	Siegel Center	VCU	73–64
64	February 1, 2003	Ted Constant Center	VCU	72–69
65	January 21, 2004	Ted Constant Center	VCU	75–67
66	February 21, 2004	Siegel Center	VCU	78–72
67	March 7, 2004	Richmond Coliseum	VCU	84–67
68	January 29, 2005	Siegel Center	VCU	75–71
69	February 12, 2005	Ted Constant Center	Old Dominion	82–76
70	March 7, 2005	Richmond Coliseum	Old Dominion	73–66^{OT}
71	January 14, 2006	Ted Constant Center	Old Dominion	78–75
72	February 11, 2006	Siegel Center	VCU	80–74
73	January 20, 2007	Siegel Center	VCU	80–75
74	February 10, 2007	Ted Constant Center	Old Dominion	79–63
75	January 19, 2008	Ted Constant Center	VCU	78–68
76	February 16, 2008	Siegel Center	Old Dominion	67–66
77	January 17, 2009	Siegel Center	VCU	61–44
78	February 14, 2009	Ted Constant Center	Old Dominion	69–65
79	March 8, 2009	Richmond Coliseum	VCU	61–53
80	February 6, 2010	Siegel Center	VCU	70–58
81	February 27, 2010	Ted Constant Center	Old Dominion	73–70
82	March 7, 2010	Richmond Coliseum	Old Dominion	73–69^{OT}
83	January 22, 2011	Ted Constant Center	VCU	59–50
84	February 12, 2011	Siegel Center	Old Dominion	70–59
85	March 7, 2011	Richmond Coliseum	Old Dominion	70–65
86	January 21, 2012	Siegel Center	VCU	61–48
87	February 11, 2012	Ted Constant Center	VCU	68–64
88	December 7, 2012	Ted Constant Center	VCU	83–70
89	December 8, 2013	Siegel Center	VCU	69–48
90	November 29, 2014	Ted Constant Center	#25 Old Dominion	73–67
91	November 28, 2015	Siegel Center	VCU	76–67
92	December 10, 2016	Ted Constant Center	VCU	67–64
93	December 2, 2017	Siegel Center	VCU	82–75
94	November 28, 2018	Ted Constant Center	Old Dominion	62–52
95	December 7, 2019	Siegel Center	#20 VCU	69–57
96	December 12, 2020	Siegel Center	VCU	77–54
97	December 11, 2021	Chartway Arena (Note: Ted Constant Convocation Center's interior was renamed Chartway Arena on June 20, 2019.)	VCU	75–66
98	October 17, 2026	Chartway Arena	VCU	71–57
Series: VCU leads 54–44
