= Alvin Duke Chandler =

Rear Admiral of the United States (1902–1987)

Rear Admiral Alvin Duke Chandler

19th Chancellor of the College of William & Mary
- In office 1962–1974
- Preceded by: Colgate Darden (1947)
- Succeeded by: Warren E. Burger (1986)

21st President of the College of William & Mary
- In office 1951–1960
- Preceded by: John Edwin Pomfret
- Succeeded by: Davis Young Paschall

Personal details
- Born: August 18, 1902 Richmond, Virginia, U.S.
- Died: May 26, 1987 (aged 84)
- Resting place: Hollywood Cemetery
- Spouse: Louise Michaels Chandler (until 1987, his death)
- Parent: Julian Alvin Carroll Chandler (1872–1934)
- Education: College of William & Mary (attended, 1918); U.S. Naval Academy (B.S., 1923); Imperial Defence College (1949-1950)
- Occupation: Naval officer, educator
- Awards: Legion of Merit with Gold Star

Alvin Duke Chandler (August 18, 1902 – May 26, 1987) was an American Navy officer and the twenty-first president of the College of William & Mary, serving from 1951 to 1960. He also served as the chancellor of The Colleges of William & Mary from 1960 to 1962; after that system was disbanded, he served as Chancellor of the College from 1962 to 1974. Prior to his career at the College of William & Mary, Chandler served in the United States Navy, eventually reaching the rank of vice-admiral. His father, Julian Alvin Carroll Chandler, also served as president of the College of William & Mary. His personal papers as well as the papers from his time as president can be found in the Special Collections Research Center at the College of William & Mary.

== Naval officer (1923–1951) ==
Chandler attended William and Mary in 1918–1919, prior to his appointment to the U.S. Naval Academy, graduating in 1923.

Commander Chandler was a student at the Naval War College about 1936-1938.

During the Guadalcanal Campaign Cdr Chandler commanded Destroyer Division 41 in the Battle of Rennell Island. USS Chevalier (DD-451), USS Edwards (DD-619), USS Meade (DD-602), and USS Taylor (DD-468) made up his force.

He was director of logistics plans for the U.S. Navy when he retired to accept the presidency of the College of William & Mary (1951).

== Educator (1951–1974) ==
The Board of Visitors appointed Admiral Chandler president of the College of William & Mary in haste, and outraged the faculty by failing to consult them. His predecessor had been forced out of office following a scandal over changing grades for football players on the college team. After taking office, he instituted uniform admission standards for all students. During his tenure, he oversaw the expansion of the faculty, curriculum changes, and the construction of five new buildings. He left office to become chancellor of the Colleges of William & Mary (1960–1962), until the General Assembly of Virginia made those five public colleges independent. Then he was chancellor of the college (1962–1974).

The faculty were unhappy with President Chandler when state law required that they subscribe to loyalty oaths. A star professor decamped for McGill University, and faculty recruiting suffered.

Students chafed at censorship of their publications, restrictions on drinking, and requirements for chaperones.

== Death ==
On May 26, 1987, Chandler died. He was buried in Hollywood Cemetery.
