= John Stewart Bryan =

American publisher and college president

- Bryan pictured in The Colonial Echo 1935, William and Mary yearbook

17th Chancellor of the College of William & Mary
- In office 1942–1944
- Preceded by: Hugh Blair Grigsby (1881)
- Succeeded by: Colgate Darden (1946)

19th President of the College of William & Mary
- In office 1934–1942
- Preceded by: J. A. C. Chandler
- Succeeded by: John Edwin Pomfret

Personal details
- Born: October 23, 1871 Henrico County, Virginia, U.S.
- Died: October 16, 1944 (aged 72) Richmond, Virginia, U.S.
- Education: University of Virginia (AB); Harvard University (LLB)

John Stewart Bryan (October 23, 1871 – October 16, 1944) was an American newspaper publisher, attorney, and college president. He was the nineteenth president of the College of William and Mary, serving from 1934 to 1942. He also served as the fourth American chancellor of the college from 1942 to 1944.

Prior to his service as president of the College of William and Mary, Bryan served as the publisher of the Richmond Times-Dispatch and the president of the American Newspaper Publishers Association.

== Early life ==
In 1871, John Stewart Bryan was born in Henrico County, Virginia, to an affluent southern family. Bryan's great grandfather Joseph Bryan had been a congressman from Georgia from 1803 to 1806. His grandfather John Randolph Bryan was tutored by his namesake John Randolph of Virginia and ultimately relocated his family to Gloucester County, Virginia and then Fluvanna County, Virginia. John Stewart Bryan's father served in the Civil War before completing his law degree from the University of Virginia in 1868.

By the time John Stewart Bryan was born, his father Joseph Bryan had taken on Richmond tobacco magnate Lewis Ginter as a legal client. In 1887, Bryan's father purchased the Daily Times newspaper (a forerunner of today's Richmond Times-Dispatch and Media General Corporation) from Ginter. Through a series of newspaper mergers and acquisitions, Joseph Bryan became the owner of both the Richmond Times-Dispatch and The Richmond News Leader.

While his father ran the fledgling Times newspaper, he was sent to boarding school to the Episcopal High School in Alexandria, Virginia. Bryan graduated in 1893 from the University of Virginia, where he was a member of St. Anthony Hall. He also obtained a law degree from Harvard University in 1897.

== Career ==
After a brief stint as a lawyer in New York, Bryan returned to Richmond in 1898 to form a joint practice with Murray Mason McGuire. He then quit law to work for his father's newspaper company in 1900.

When his father died in 1908, Bryan took over as president of both newspapers. He sold off the Richmond Times-Dispatch in 1914 but retained ownership of The Richmond News Leader.

By 1927, John Stewart Bryan had become the president of the American Newspaper Publishers Association. He partnered with Chicago newspaperman Samuel Emory Thomason to purchase The Tampa Tribune for $900,000. In 1928, they purchased the Chicago Daily Journal.

In 1926 Bryan became a member of the board of visitors of the College of William and Mary in Williamsburg. Early in the 1930s, as vice rector, he served under the erratic leadership of President Julian Alvin Carroll Chandler. Following Chandler's death, the board named Bryan president of the college on June 30, 1934. Bryan became the nineteenth president of the College of William and Mary, serving until 1942. He also served as the fourth American chancellor of the college from 1942 to 1944, the fifth post-colonial chancellor, and the seventeenth overall.

In addition to the financial struggles of the Great Depression, Bryan's tenure was also marked by the recent establishment and beginnings of Colonial Williamsburg. Largely thanks to the vision of a William and Mary instructor, Reverend Dr. W. A. R. Goodwin and the substantial financial support from John D. Rockefeller Jr. and his wife, Abby Aldrich Rockefeller, the William and Mary Campus had seen substantial construction on campus from 1928 to 1932, as historic buildings were restored to their 18th-century appearance. Significant campus construction continued under Bryan, including the 1935, Sunken Garden designed by Charles M. Robinson.

In 1940, towards the end of Bryan's tenure as president of William and Mary, Richmond, Virginia's two newspapers, the Times-Dispatch and News Leader, merged to form Richmond Newspapers, a majority of which was owned by the Bryan family. This conglomerate would later be known as Media General.

== Honors ==
Bryan Hall, a residence hall on the campus of the College of William and Mary, bears his name, as does the complex of which it is part.

His papers from his service as president and chancellor of the College of William and Mary are held by the Special Collections Research Center at the College of William and Mary.

== Personal life ==
Bryan sat on the board of visitors of the University of Virginia from 1918 to 1920 and was rector from 1920 until 1922. In 1922 and 1923 John Stewart Bryan became president of the Richmond Public Library Association and then the chairman of the Richmond Public Library Board. He led the fundraising to build the first Richmond Public Library, which opened in 1924.

He was president of the Virginia Historical Society in 1936 and 1937, an early vice president of the Virginia Museum of Fine Arts, and served on the board of overseers of Harvard University from 1937 to 1943.

Bryan died in October 16, 1944 leaving the newspapers to his son D. Tennant Bryan.
