= Robert Saunders Jr. =

American politician and educator

14th President of the College of William & Mary
- In office 1846–1848
- Preceded by: Thomas Roderick Dew
- Succeeded by: John Johns

Senate of Virginia
- In office 1852–1858

Personal details
- Born: January 25, 1805
- Died: September 11, 1868 or 1869
- Party: Whig
- Spouse: Lucy Burwell Page Saunders
- Education: College of William & Mary; University of Virginia

Robert Saunders Jr. (January 25, 1805 – September 11, 1868 or 1869) was an American politician and school administrator who served as president of the College of William & Mary from 1847 to 1848. Prior to that, Saunders served as professor of mathematics from 1833 to 1847. He also served as a Virginia state senator from 1852 to 1858 and as mayor of Williamsburg, Virginia in 1859 and 1868 as well as the head of Eastern State Hospital (then known as the Eastern Lunatic Asylum). His family papers are held by the Special Collections Research Center at the College of William & Mary.

== Ancestry ==
The first of the Saunders family is thought to have moved to Virginia in the late Seventeenth century. During this time, Robert Saunders Jr.'s great-great-great-grandfather John Saunders (died c. February 1700) accumulated large amounts of property–both land and slaves–along the York River in York County.

== Biography ==
Robert Saunders Jr. was born January 25, 1805, to Robert Saunders (born 1761) and his second wife Susannah Jones. Like his father, Saunders attended the College of William & Mary, receiving an A.B. in 1823. He also attended the University of Virginia in 1825, the university's first year of operation, taking courses in law.

On June 17, 1828, Saunders married Lucy Burwell Page, daughter of John Page, the former Virginia Governor and congressman of the U.S. House of Representatives. Lucy became an author, writing short stories including at least one ghost story.

Saunders was elected professor of mathematics at the College of William & Mary in 1833 and served in this position until 1848. While the college's president, Thomas Roderick Dew, was away on an extended honeymoon trip to Europe with his new wife Natalia Hay, Saunders was to serve in the role pro tem. However, Dew died in Paris in August 1846, leading to Saunders being narrowly selected to assume the role officially. Saunders is notable as he was the sole president of the college not to reside in the President's House during his presidency, instead electing to remain in his residence along the Palace Green near the former site of the Governor's Palace.

Saunders's time as President of the college was fraught with divisiveness and a general decline in the college's wellbeing. John Millington and other professors urged Saunders to move the college to Richmond, but Saunders's support for such an action and his inability to stabilize the college led to the forced resignation of Saunders and nearly every professor. Staunch slavery advocate Nathaniel Beverly Tucker of the Law School was spared this fate as his politics secured favor with the Board of Visitors.

After leaving the college, Saunders was elected to the Virginia state senate in 1852, representing Williamsburg for three two-year terms. Faltering in the political sphere, Saunders travelled alone to seek employment with the Confederate States of America in Richmond, ultimately finding some clerical work. Robert Saunders Jr. died in either 1868 or 1869. Lucy died in 1885.

Political offices
Preceded by John J. Maupin; John H. Barlow	Mayor of Williamsburg, Virginia; 1859; 1868	Succeeded by R. M. Garrett; Robert F. Cole
