= John Pomfret =

John Pomfret may refer to:

- John Pomfret (poet) (1667–1702), English poet and clergyman
- John Pomfret (journalist) (born 1959), American journalist and writer
- John Edwin Pomfret (1898–1981), American academic
