= Thomas Ashley Graves Jr. =

American academic

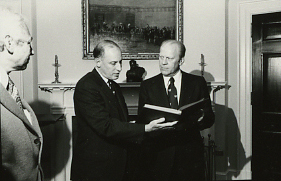
- Graves (left) with President Gerald Ford in 1976

23rd President of the College of William & Mary
- In office 1971–1985
- Preceded by: Davis Young Paschall
- Succeeded by: Paul R. Verkuil

Personal details
- Born: July 3, 1924
- Died: June 17, 2016 (aged 91) Williamsburg, Virginia
- Education: Yale University; Harvard University

Thomas Ashley Graves Jr. (July 3, 1924 – June 17, 2016) was an American academic who was the twenty-third president of the College of William & Mary, serving from 1971 to 1985. He next served as director of the Winterthur Museum, Garden and Library from 1985 to 1992. His personal papers as well as his papers from his time as president of the College of William & Mary, are held by the Special Collections Research Center at the College of William & Mary.
