= Lucy Burwell Page Saunders =

- Born: 1808; Rosewell
- Died: June 16, 1885 (aged 76–77)
- Spouse(s): Robert Saunders Jr.
- Parent(s): John Page; Margaret Lowther Page

Lucy Burwell Page Saunders (1808 – June 16, 1885) was an American writer.

== Life ==
Lucy Burwell Page was born in 1808 on Rosewell Plantation in Gloucester County, Virginia, which for a century was the homestead of the Page family, one of the First Families of Virginia. She was the daughter of John Page, the 13th Governor of Virginia, and his second wife, Margaret Lowther Page (1759–1835), an early American poet and hostess of a literary salon in Williamsburg, Virginia. Saunders was the twentieth and last surviving child of John Page.

In 1828, she married Robert Saunders, Jr., a native of Williamsburg who was later professor of mathematics at and the 14th president of The College of William and Mary. He also served as mayor of Williamsburg and a Virginia State Senator. They lived in what is today called the Robert Carter House on Palace Green Street in Williamsburg. Originally built by the Carter family, Robert Saunders, Sr. purchased it from Robert Carter III in 1801.

During the American Civil War, Robert and Lucy Saunders were forced to flee their home prior to the Battle of Williamsburg in 1862. The Robert Carter House was substantially looted, and Robert Saunders was criticized by Williamsburg Provost Marshal David Edward Cronin for abandoning the house full of its valuable contents of books, art, and furniture. Much of what was looted was from the family of Lucy Page Saunders: papers of Governor John Page, including documents signed by George Washington, colonial American newspapers, and a portrait by Charles Willson Peale of a man known as Selim the Algerian, the whereabouts of which are still unknown.

Following the death of her husband in 1868, Saunders moved to the Louise Home for Women in Washington, D.C., an institution founded by William Wilson Corcoran as a home for impoverished genteel women. Saunders died at the Louise Home in June 1885.

== Works ==
In the 1870s, Saunders published two short books. Her 1872 novel Dora Lee: Or, the Visit to Montpelier was credited to "A Lady of Louise Home". It is a fictionalized account of Saunders' 1817 childhood visit to Montpelier, the home of U.S. President James Madison and First Lady Dolley Madison. The Madisons had a notoriously abusive parrot named Polly, and Polly likely inspired the appearance in Dora Lee of a French-speaking macaw named Fanchon who attacks three different characters in the space of eight pages of the novel.

Saunders' 1876 book Lenora and the Ghost is a Christmas story set in a fictionalized version of her childhood home. Her extensive descriptions of the house are an important source of information about the interior of the Rosewell Plantation, which burned in 1916. A stage version of the story is regularly performed by the Rosewell Foundation, the organization responsible for the upkeep of the ruins of the plantation.
