= 1951 William & Mary scandal =

Academic scandal in the US

The William & Mary scandal of 1951 was a transcript-altering scandal at the College of William & Mary in Williamsburg, Virginia, United States. Prior to World War II, college officials at William & Mary "attempted to [have The College] become a big-time football power" despite its "enrollment of far less than 1000 males". (Other sources place the enrollment at approximately 1,500 students in the late 1930s.) That is, The college tried to become a formidable NCAA Division I athletics power despite its small size. Pressures to be successful in sports—especially football, men's basketball, and baseball—had been mounting for over a decade by the time the scandal was discovered in 1951.

== The scandal ==
In 1946, the William & Mary Board of Visitors announced their goal of achieving more contest wins than losses. Rube McCray, the head football coach from 1944 to 1950, was given a substantial pay raise so that consistently winning teams could be produced. As a side effect of this decision, almost all of the college's scholastic financial aid was given to athletes coming into William & Mary, despite some of them having minimal academic qualifications. The football program was initially successful after World War II with the influx of veterans, but in order to continue the success, members of the athletic department found it necessary to modify players' high school transcripts to get them admitted to the college. Later, football players were given credit and grades for summer school classes they never attended. McCray, who jointly served as the school's athletic director and head football coach, acknowledged that the problems were on "his watch", but said he had nothing to do with altering any players' transcripts. Throughout the entire time of the changes, circa 1947–1950, none of the players knew their grades or transcripts had been changed. An initial investigation in late 1949 by the college's registrar J. Wilfred Lambert, who also was dean of students, discovered the transcript altering, but could not determine the culprits. Players, at the time, did not realize there were any problems. After Lambert's report to the college's president, the procedure for handling transcripts of athletes was completely revised. No action was taken against anyone in the athletic department.

From 1940 to 1949, the William & Mary Indians football teams were more dominant than any other era in the program's history. The 1942 team, under head coach Carl Voyles (1939–1944), compiled a 9–1–1 overall record and defeated perennial football powerhouse University of Oklahoma, 14–7, in Norman. In several of the seasons after the war they were ranked in the national top 20, and they also routinely played the country's top teams, managing to tie the 3rd-ranked North Carolina in 1948. Twenty-four players were drafted to the National Football League (NFL), some of whom went on to have highly successful professional careers. The Indians won two Southern Conference championships and played in their first two bowl games on January 1, 1948, and January 1, 1949. Some of the football success in the years after 1946 can be attributed, in part, to gaining some good athletes through false transcripts.

=== Repercussions ===
According to John Sayle Watterson, writing in College Football: History, Spectacle, Controversy (2000), the William and Mary investigations leading to the exposure and scandal began with an acting director of admissions, J. Wilfred "Cy" Lambert, who discovered a football grade report discrepancy in early 1949—an incoming athlete never having taken high school Spanish, appearing with credits for it, and ignorant of the discrepancy—with Lambert tracing the transcript doctoring to a William and Mary gymnasium typewriter; Lambert reported his findings to President of The College, John Pomfret, who "did not seem shocked", but acted through a Dean to ensure future high school record transfers by-passed the athletic department, instead going directly to admissions. Sources report Nelson Marshall, Dean of the College, being later assigned to investigate wrongdoing; per R.A. Smith, writing in the NASSH Proceedings in 1987, Marshall "investigated... rumors of wrong doing" and reported his findings to President Pomfret in April 1951. Watterson's monograph, on the other hand, states the investigation was into various specifics, with report being given in June 1951, including on aspects of student work oversight by athletic director and football coach Rube McCray—a serially rewarded employee advanced by The College's Board of Visitors for his "producing winning teams", such that "he was paid as well as—[Smith would say 'more than']—any faculty member". Specific McCray infractions described include overstating student hours and gathering resulting funds from the "bogus overtime" to funnel them toward support of athletes.

Watterson states that on hearing of Marshall's findings, "the president had no choice but to act decisively", but that "[h]e pondered two courses of action", going directly to The College's Board of Visitors, versus continuing the investigation—and he chose the latter. At the same time, he gave two already implicated coaches, including McCray, the choice of later facing the Board (after completion of the investigation), or the "fair but firm" decision that they both submit immediate letters of resignation, but effective after the end of their ongoing season; both chose to create the post-dated letters of resignation. Pomfret proceeded to appoint a faculty committee to further probe the management of The College's athletic program, and, meanwhile to separate the academic department of physical education from the athletic operation. In describing the same events, the Smith (1987) Proceedings abstract states the perspective, succinctly, that on report of Marshall's [April] findings, Pomfret "dragged his feet", acted on a felt need to fulfill a promise to make Coach McCray a full professor of physical education (despite evidence of illegalities), and then accepted the "delayed resignation[s]" of both implicated coaches. The referenced illegalities Smith lays out include "altering high school transcripts, college transcripts, and granting grades for courses not taken by athletes", for both the football and basketball programs.

Information regarding the scandal was leaked to the press, and shortly thereafter it had become a lead story in many national media outlets. There were many discussions among board members, between Pomfret and the board, and between Pomfret and the coaches. Within several days both McCray and Wilson resigned. The public exposure caused a rift between the Board of Visitors and the college faculty. The faculty maintained that their "control of all phases of intercollegiate athletics" was required by the Southern Association of Colleges and Schools to maintain membership. Pomfret resigned amid the turmoil and was replaced by a non-academic naval officer, Alvin Duke Chandler. In protest to this hiring, because the board of visitors did not allow the faculty any participation in the presidential search, several faculty members and the dean of the college resigned. As a result, the athletic program at William & Mary dramatically changed: from 1951 through 1954 the teams were competitive even though in 1953 there were only 24 players on the team. But the "big time" football years had ended, because the faculty would never let anyone forget about how the school's academics had been tainted. Starting in 1955, the football team began losing more games than it won; from 1955 to 1964, the Indians hadn't a single season with a .500 record or better. The teams turned around under coaches Marv Levy and Lou Holtz from 1964 until the end of the decade, but the scandal had done its damage.

== Historical context ==
The William & Mary scandal of 1951 took place in a unique context, following the emergence of subsidies being paid in support of collegiate coaches and players through the 1920s, through the changes to sport during the war and after return of men from combat in World War II (with the opportunity and challenges this created for collegiate sports), into an early era of the NCAA's attempts to impose constraints on collegiate subsidy and recruitng programs (e.g., through its "Sanity Code") in the mid- to late-1940s, and on to subsequent acceptance or rebellion of particular schools at the turn of the calendar to 1950, depending upon their interests and leadership philosophies—e.g., the Big Ten and Pacific Coast Conferences, in contrast to schools in Virginia, and the Southern Conference and other southern schools—to allow or reject, respectively, NCAA regulation of their athletic program financing.

In this context, William & Mary's ensuing scandal preceded or was coincident with large, impactful ones at other institutions; between the time of President Pomfret's 15–18 August meeting presentation of Dean Nelson Marshall's investigative findings to the William & Mary Board of Visitors—a Board that that had, up to that point "put a far higher premium on football than on academics"—and Pomfret's resignation as scapegoat on 13 September, the United States Military Academy (West Point) had disclosed that Army's Black Knights football team—"almost its entire... team, including [the] Coach...'s son"—had violated Army's "hallowed honor code against cheating", resulting in all players being forced to leave the academy. And in the same timeframe, the University of Kentucky's basketball team, a national championship-winning program, was a part of "the most notorious... point-shaving scandals of 1951", as 33 of its team members "had cooperated with gamblers" to fix, in total, 49 Kentucky games.

Hence, the "misdeeds at William and Mary gained more notariety than they might have at another time" because of this juxtaposition, but also, in particular, because while West Point was only viewed as a "vocational school for future... army brass", William and Mary was a school whose scandal raised broader, more general concerns in the academic leadership of college presidents and faculty.

== See also ==
- 1951 Army Cadets football team – the Army team that was also in violation of their honor code, and players were subsequently kicked off
- 1951 college basketball point-shaving scandal – one lesser known aspect of that specific scandal involved multiple players during a similar time period faking their transcripts to play for the City College of New York team
