= Wallace Sterling =

American historian

5th President of Stanford University
- In office April 1, 1949 – September 1, 1968
- Preceded by: Donald Tresidder; Clarence Faust (acting)
- Succeeded by: Robert Glaser (acting); Kenneth Pitzer

2nd Director of Huntington Library
- In office July 1, 1948 – March 1949
- Preceded by: Max Farrand
- Succeeded by: John Edwin Pomfret

Personal details
- Born: John Ewart Wallace Sterling; August 6, 1906 Linwood, Ontario, Canada
- Died: July 1, 1985 (aged 78) Woodside, California, U.S.
- Spouse: Anna Maria Shaver
- Education: University of Toronto (BA); University of Alberta (MA); Stanford University (PhD)

John Ewart Wallace Sterling (August 6, 1906 – July 1, 1985) was an American educator who served as the fifth president of Stanford University from 1949 to 1968.

== Life and career ==
Sterling was born in Linwood, Ontario, the son of Annie (née Wallace) and William Sterling, a Methodist clergyman. He pursued his undergraduate studies at the University of Toronto and received a Master of Arts degree from the University of Alberta. Sterling played football and basketball at the University of Toronto and coached both sports at Alberta.

He began his doctoral studies in history at Stanford University in 1932, serving on the research staff of the Hoover Institution. He received a Ph.D. in 1938 with a dissertation on "Diplomacy and the newspaper press in Austria Hungary, Midsummer 1914." It was never published. He joined the faculty of the California Institute of Technology. In 1948, he left Caltech to head the Huntington Library and Art Gallery and shortly afterward was offered the Stanford presidency. He was named as the Chairman of the American Revolution Bicentennial Commission (ARBC), appointed by President Nixon in 1969 to plan and construct the 1976, 200th-anniversary celebration of the United States.

Sterling was married to Anna Maria Shaver.

=== Stanford presidency ===
During his 20-year term as president he oversaw the growth of Stanford from a financially troubled regional university to a financially sound, internationally recognized academic powerhouse, "the Harvard of the West". Achievements during his tenure included:

- Moving the Stanford Medical School from a small, inadequate campus in San Francisco to a new facility on the Stanford campus which was fully integrated into the university to an unusual degree for medical schools.
- Establishing the Stanford Industrial Park (now the Stanford Research Park) and the Stanford Shopping Center on leased University land, thus stabilizing the university's finances. The Stanford Industrial Park, together with the university's aggressive pursuit of government research grants, helped to spur the development of Silicon Valley.
- Increasing the number of students receiving financial aid from less than 5% when he took office to more than one-third when he retired.
- Increasing the size of the student body from 8,300 to 11,300 and the size of the tenured faculty from 322 to 974.
- Launching the PACE fundraising program, the largest such program ever undertaken by any university up to that time.
- Launching a building boom on campus that included a new bookstore, post office, student union, dormitories, a faculty club, and many academic buildings.
- Creating the Overseas Campus program for undergraduates in 1958.

In 2022, Stanford University issued a public apology for its discrimination against Jewish applicants in the 1950s, which was documented through internal memos involving Sterling.

== Memorials ==
- On March 2, 2015, Stanford Archives posted 444 images of Sterling and his papers to its Flickr stream.
- An Indian rubber tree (Ficus elastica cv. doescheri), which he planted at the opening of the University of Hawaiʻi at Mānoa's Sinclair Library, is listed by the UHM Campus Arboretum as the J. E. Wallace Sterling Namesake Tree.

== See also ==
- History of Stanford University

Academic offices
Preceded by Max Farrand	2nd Director of Huntington Library; 1948 – 1949	Succeeded by John Edwin Pomfret
Preceded by Clarence Faust (acting)	5th President of Stanford University; 1949 – 1968	Succeeded by Robert Glaser (acting)
