= R. M. Garrett =

American politician

Robert Major ("R. M.") Garrett (1807-1885), was a medical doctor and Virginia politician who served as mayor of Williamsburg, Virginia, from 1859 to 1863. Garrett was educated at the College of William & Mary, and, in addition to serving as mayor, he was a medical doctor and the administrator of Eastern State Hospital.

Preceded by Robert Saunders	Mayor of Williamsburg, Virginia; 1859–1862	Succeeded by Lemuel J. Bowden
