= William Dawson (clergyman) =

American academic

The Reverend William Dawson

2nd President of the College of William & Mary
- In office 1743–1752
- Preceded by: James Blair
- Succeeded by: William Stith

Personal details
- Born: 1704 Cumberland, England
- Died: 1752 (aged 47–48)
- Education: Queen's College, Oxford

William Dawson (1704–1752) was an Anglican clergyman, poet and member of the Governor's Council of Virginia who became the second president of The College of William & Mary in Williamsburg, Virginia (1743–1752).

== Early life and education ==
Dawson was born in Cumberland, England in 1704. He began studies at Queen's College of Oxford University when he was 15 years old, graduated with a M.A. in 1728, and was admitted as a fellow of the college in 1733 (by which time he was living in the Virginia colony). His younger brother Thomas Dawson (1715–1760) also emigrated to the colony to become rector of Bruton Parish in Williamburg by 1743, and would become the fourth president of William & Mary (1755–1760).

== Career ==
Dawson was ordained in the Church of England before sailing to the Virginia Colony to become rector of the Jamestown Parish. He also taught moral philosophy at the College of William and Mary and succeeded Rev. James Blair as its president following Rev. Blair's death in 1742. Rev. Dawson also served as chaplain of the House of Burgesses during its sessions. Appointed as a member of the Governor's Council in 1745, Dawson continued to serve in what was in effect the upper house of the Virginia General Assembly until his death.

He published a 30-page book of poetry, Poems on Several Occasions by a Gentleman of Virginia, a copy of which George Washington owned.

== Personal life ==
Dawson's first wife was Mary Stith, a member of the First Families of Virginia. Her grandfathers were John Stith and William Randolph. They had three children; one grandson became North Carolina planter and politician, and eventually Congressman William Johnston Dawson. Following her death, Rev. Dawson remarried, to the widow Elizabeth Churchill Bassett, whose first husband burgess William Bassett, had died leaving a considerable estate in New Kent County, Virginia, as well as a young son, Burgess Bassett Sr., whom Dawson helped raise. Thus, his step-grandson, Burgess Bassett Jr. would also become a Congressman, as well as serve in both houses of the Virginia General Assembly and on the vestry of historic Bruton Parish Church.

== Legacy ==
Dawson died in 1752, and was succeeded by his Virginia-born brother-in-law, Rev. William Stith, who would only survive three years, and be succeeded by Rev. Dawson's brother Thomas. Some of William and Thomas Dawson's papers are held by the Library of Congress. A facsimile edition of his poetry book was published in 1931. Both Dawson brothers are collectively the namesakes for Dawson Hall in the Bryan Complex at William & Mary. The college also has a portrait formerly thought to be of Dawson.
