= William Johnston Dawson =

American politician

Member of the U.S. House of Representatives from North Carolina's 8th district
- In office March 4, 1793 – March 3, 1795
- Preceded by: District established
- Succeeded by: Dempsey Burgess

Member of the North Carolina House of Representatives
- In office 1791

Personal details
- Born: 1765 near Edenton, North Carolina, British America
- Died: January 16, 1796 (aged 30–31) Bertie County, North Carolina, U.S.
- Party: Anti-Administration
- Relatives: Gabriel Johnston (grandfather); William Dawson (grandfather)

William Johnston Dawson (1765 – January 16, 1796) was a U.S. Congressman from the state of North Carolina from 1793 to 1795 and a member of the North Carolina House of Commons.

== Early life ==
Dawson was born near Edenton in Chowan County, North Carolina. His grandfather was royal Governor Gabriel Johnston. He was also the grandson of William Dawson, the second president of The College of William & Mary, and a great-great grandson of John Stith and William Randolph.

== Political career ==
Dawson represented Bertie County in the state constitutional conventions of 1788 and 1789. He was elected to the North Carolina House of Commons (now called the House of Representatives) in 1791 and was a member of the committee which was appointed to choose a site for the new state capital, Raleigh, that same year. Dawson Street in downtown Raleigh is named for him. Dawson was elected to the 3rd United States Congress in the election of February 15, 1793, a three-way race in which he, as the Anti-Federalist candidate, defeated two Federalists: Stephen Cabarrus (Speaker of the State House) and William Cumming. Dawson served from March 4, 1793 to March 3, 1795. He lost his race for re-election on February 13, 1795 to Dempsey Burges.

== Death ==
Dawson died in Bertie County, North Carolina. His obituary, printed in the North Carolina Journal on February 1, 1796, stated that Dawson died on January 16, 1796 but the Biographical Directory of the United States Congress, which lists his middle name as "Johnson," puts his death at 1798.

U.S. House of Representatives
Preceded by District created	Member of the U.S. House of Representatives from North Carolina's 8th congressional district 1793-1795	Succeeded by Dempsey Burges
