= Thomas Dawson (college president) =

18th-century American priest and academic administrator

The Reverend Thomas Dawson

4th President of the College of William & Mary
- In office 1755–1760
- Preceded by: William Stith
- Succeeded by: William Yates

Personal details
- Died: November 29, 1760
- Education: College of William & Mary

Thomas Dawson was an Anglican priest and the fourth president of The College of William & Mary in Williamsburg, Virginia (1755–1760). He is also the brother of William Dawson, who was the second president of William & Mary (1743–1752). He was educated at William & Mary and also held several religious positions, including being an Anglican clergyman, rector of the Bruton Parish, and commissary of the Bishop of London. Dawson was also a member of the Governor's Council and master of the Indian School at the College.

In 1752 Dawson married Priscilla Bassett, the daughter of Colonel William Bassett. Dawson died on November 29, 1760, reportedly in Williamsburg.

Dawson and his brother are together namesakes of a residence hall at William & Mary.
