= William Stith =

American historian

The Reverend William Stith

3rd President of the College of William & Mary
- In office 1752–1755
- Preceded by: William Dawson
- Succeeded by: Thomas Dawson

Personal details
- Born: 1707
- Died: September 19, 1755
- Education: College of William & Mary; The Queen's College, Oxford

William Stith (1707 – September 19, 1755) was an early American historian and an Anglican minister. He was the third president of the College of William & Mary (1752–1755), where Stith Hall was named for him.

== Early life ==
Stith was the son of Captain John Stith and Mary Randolph, a daughter of William Randolph (1650– 1711). (Note: Goode states that his parents were Captain John Stith and Mary Randolph and that they married in 1688. Page states that they had married in 1712, which would have been five years after William's birth in 1707.) Stith's grandfather was Major John Stith, who participated in Nathaniel Bacon's rebellion.

Stith was educated at the College of William & Mary's Grammar School and The Queen's College, Oxford. On May 27, 1728, he received his B.A. degree. On April 12, 1731, while still in England, he was ordained a minister of the Anglican Church. He then returned to Williamsburg.

== Career ==
Coat of Arms of William Stith

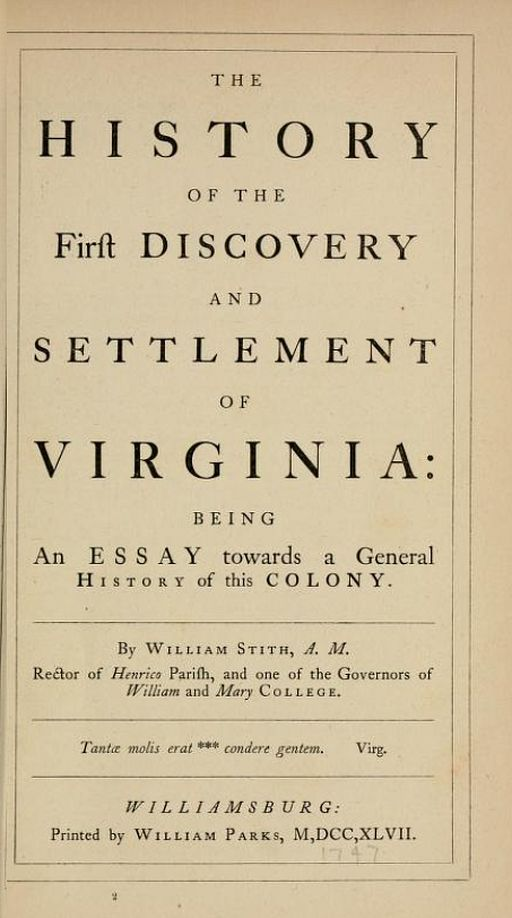
William Stith (1747) The History of the First Discovery and Settlement of Virginia: being an Essay towards a General History of this Colony, Williamsburg: William Parks.

In October 1731, he became a master of the College of William & Mary's Grammar School. He also began his role at the Virginia House of Burgesses as a chaplain. Stith was a minister for 16 years at the Henrico Parish in Henrico County beginning in 1736. He was also a minister in York County, Virginia of the York-Hampton Parish. In the 1740s and 1750s, three of his sermons were published.

The Sinfulness and Pernicious Nature of Gaming, 1752 was preached by Stith in Williamsburg before the Virginia General Assembly on March 1, 1752. The General Assembly had considered amending the 1748 Act for preventing excessive and deceitful gambling, but tabled the measure after hearing the sermon. The sermon was published in 1752 and became one of the best selling titles that year.

He is the author of one of the earliest histories of Virginia, The History of the First Discovery and Settlement of Virginia: being an Essay towards a General History of this Colony, published in Williamsburg by William Parks in 1747.

He was also the College of William & Mary's third president (1752–1755) and is the namesake of Stith Hall, a residence hall on the campus.

== Marriage and children ==
He married his first cousin, Judith Randolph, the daughter of Thomas Randolph of Tuckahoe on July 13, 1738. (Note: He was also said to have married her around 1744.) They had three daughters: Judith, Elizabeth, and Mary.

== Bibliography ==
- Stith, William (1747). The History of the First Discovery and Settlement of Virginia.
