= The Richmond News Leader =

Afternoon newspaper in Richmond, Virginia

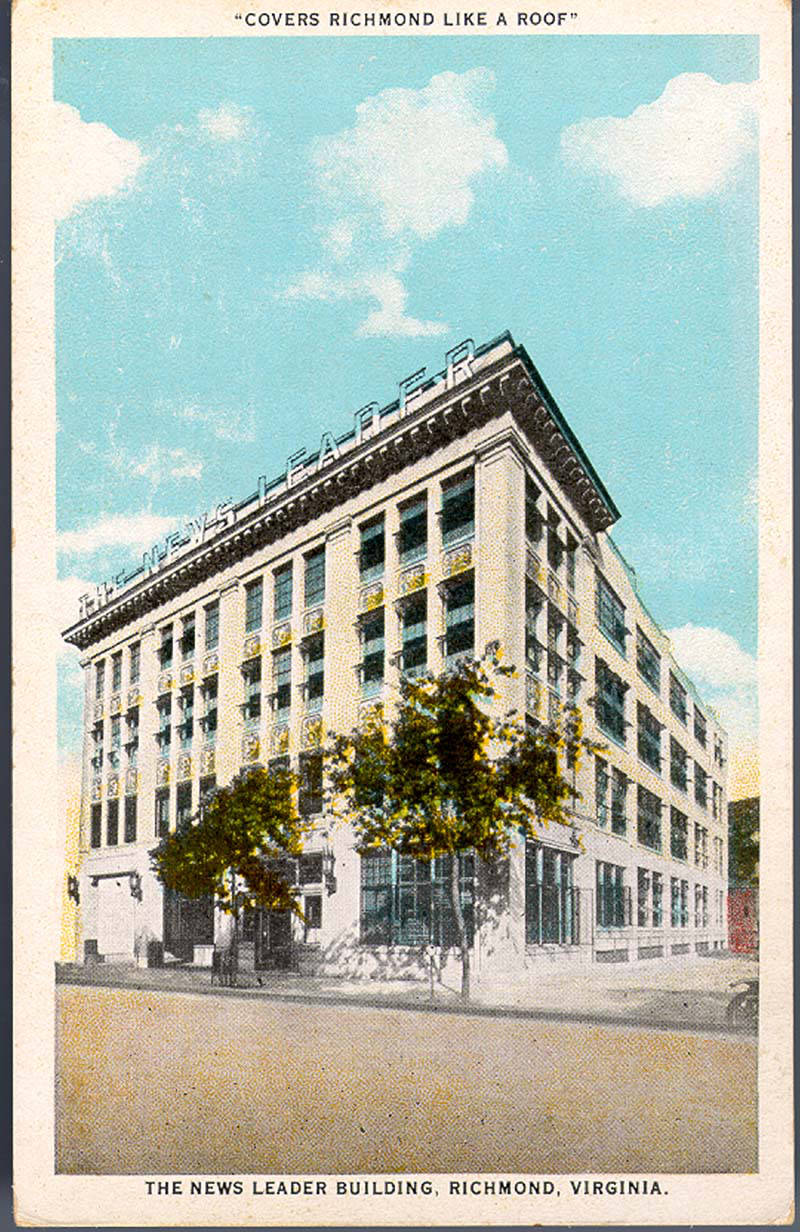
- Type: Daily newspaper
- Format: Broadsheet
- Owner: Media General
- Founded: 1888 (as The Leader)
- Ceased publication: 1992
- Headquarters: 333 East Grace Street; Richmond, Virginia 23219; United States
- Price: 35 Cents
- OCLC number: 9447277

The Richmond News Leader was an afternoon daily newspaper published in Richmond, Virginia from 1888 to 1992. During much of its run, it was the largest newspaper source in Richmond, competing with the morning Richmond Times-Dispatch. By the late 1960s, afternoon papers had been steadily losing their audiences to television, and The News Leader was no exception. Its circulation at one time exceeded 200,000, but at the time of its closing, it had fallen below 80,000.

Notable alumni of the newspaper included historian and biographer Douglas Southall Freeman, future television journalist Roger Mudd, conservative commentator James Kilpatrick, and editorial cartoonist Jeff MacNelly. During its run, it garnered a reputation as being one of the most politically conservative newspapers in the United States.

== History ==
The News Leader began in nearby Manchester, Virginia, where it was founded as The Leader by J. F. Bradley and Ben P. Owen, Jr. in 1888. It was purchased in 1896 by Richmond newspaper publisher Joseph Bryan, who re-launched the paper on November 30 as The Evening Leader. On January 26, 1903, The Evening Leader merged with The Richmond News, which Harvey L. Wilson had founded in 1899 and John L. Williams had bought in 1900, to form The Richmond News Leader, owned by Williams. On the same day, Bryan's The Times and Williams' The Richmond Dispatch merged to become the Richmond Times-Dispatch, owned by Bryan. Bryan died in 1908, shortly after buying the News Leader from Williams, and left both papers to his son John Stewart Bryan.

Both newspapers, the two primary sources of news in Richmond and the main competitors of each other, were owned and published by Stewart Bryan until 1914, when he sold the Times-Dispatch to three families, including that of Norfolk newspaperman Samuel L. Slover, publisher of The Virginian-Pilot and the Norfolk Ledger-Dispatch. In 1940, Stewart Bryan repurchased the Times-Dispatch, forming the corporation Richmond Newspapers Inc., which became a subsidiary of the newly formed Media General in 1969. Stewart Bryan died in 1944, leaving Richmond Newspapers Inc. to his son, David Tennant Bryan, who served as publisher of both papers until 1978, when his son John Stewart Bryan III took over. Tennant Bryan remained as chairman, president and CEO of Media General until his son succeeded him in 1990. Tennant Bryan died in 1998.

== Support for segregation ==
During the Civil Rights Movement, the News Leader editorial page, like that of the Times-Dispatch, took a strong segregationist stance. Years after his tenure at the paper, Kilpatrick wrote that he had been an "ardent segregationist", reflecting his views in his News Leader editorials, but had since renounced segregation. In his memoirs, Mudd recalled that News Leader reporters were often told to identify local white ministers with the formal prefix "The Reverend", but local black ministers were simply to be called "Reverend." Maurice Duke, a professor at Virginia Commonwealth University, claimed that the News Leader remained "pro-Confederacy" into the 1970s, while Raymond H. Boone, publisher of the black-oriented Richmond Free Press, blamed the News Leader for racial divisions in the city.

== Closure ==
Beginning in the 1980s, the News Leader began experiencing a steady decline in circulation; the decline, like those of other afternoon newspapers at the time, was due primarily to the growth of television news outlets. By the end of the 1980s, it was obvious Richmond was no longer big enough to support separate morning and evening papers. In 1991, Media General announced that it would merge the News Leader and the Times-Dispatch into a single morning paper under the Times-Dispatch banner, effective June 1, 1992. News Leader publisher J. Stewart Bryan III, in referencing the company's dual-ownership of both newspapers, said, "[The News Leader is] a grand old name, but we could no longer afford the luxury of competing with ourselves."

The final edition of the News Leader was printed on May 30, with the single headline, "Nevermore." On the same day, the paper also printed a special commemorative magazine showing past front pages from the News Leader reporting on historic events from the 1890s to the 1990s, including the Hindenburg disaster, the attack on Pearl Harbor, the John F. Kennedy assassination, the Challenger disaster, and the First Persian Gulf War. The magazine also featured letters to the editor by local readers, many of whom had read the News Leader for decades, who wrote about numerous personal experiences tied with the paper. Staff members were transferred to the Times-Dispatch after the merger took place.

The end of the News Leader attracted national attention. Stories about the newspaper and its history appeared in The Washington Post and The New York Times. National Review, a conservative periodical, hailed the News Leader as "one of nation's great newspapers" and added, "[T]his distinctive journalistic voice will be missed. Its disappearance represents yet another advance of homogenization and yet another erosion of the sense of place in American journalism. Ave atque vale."
