= Sunken Garden (Virginia) =

Landscaped area at the College of William & Mary in Virginia

Coordinates: 37°16′15″N 76°42′41″W

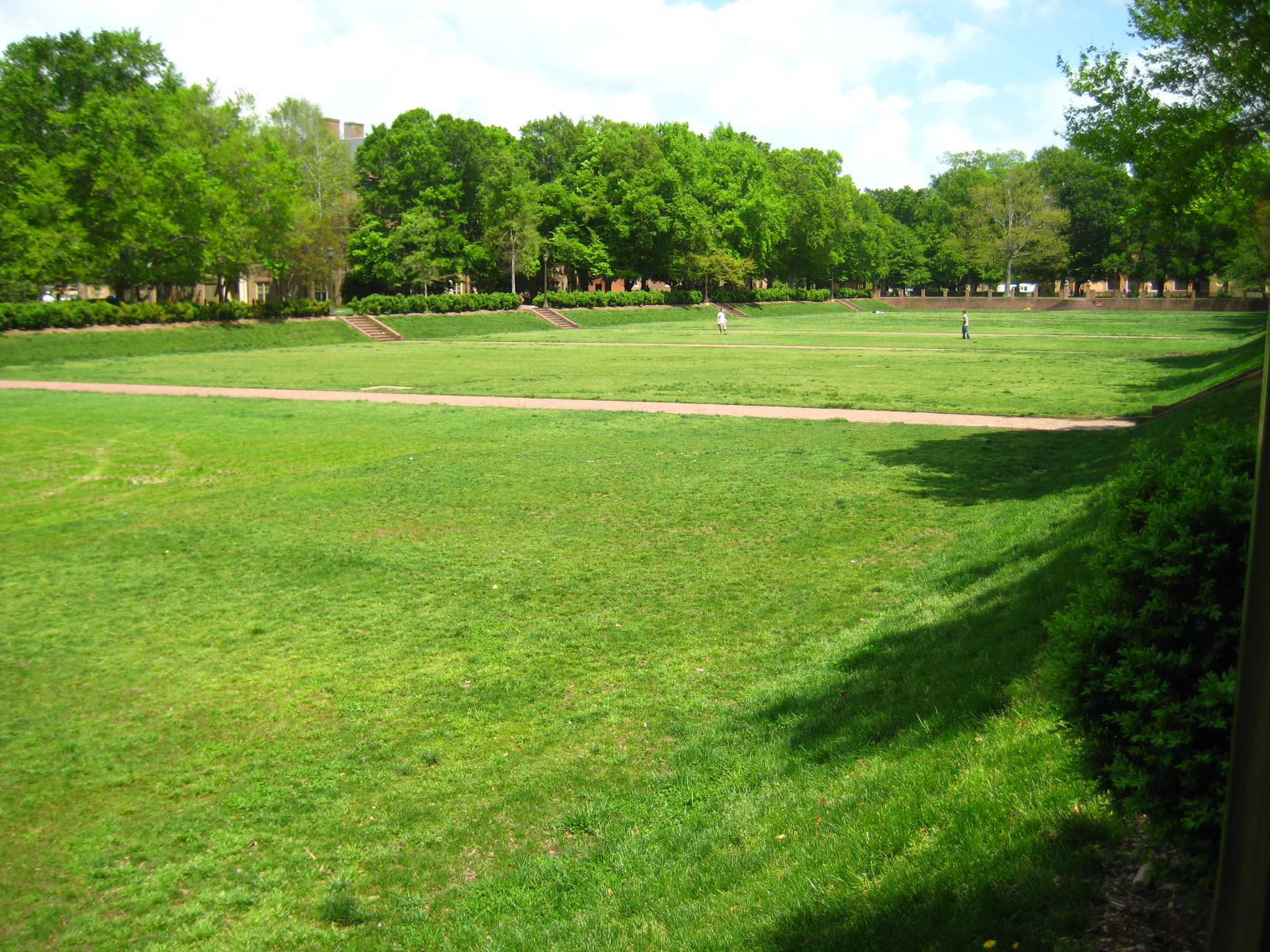
View of the Sunken Garden from its southwest corner

The Sunken Garden (often erroneously referred to as the Sunken Gardens) is the central element of the Old Campus at the College of William & Mary. The garden consists of a long stretch of grass, about 2.7 acres (1.1 ha), lying lower than the surrounding area, that runs west from the rear of the Wren Building to Crim Dell pond. The area is very popular for students wanting to study outside or play games like Ultimate. Functionally, it is similar to a university quadrangle.

The Sunken Garden was first designed by College Architect Charles M. Robinson, who was working closely with J.A.C. Chandler on the project from 1919 to 1923. The design was reportedly based on the works of Christopher Wren seen in England, especially his work at Chelsea Hospital. The plan for a sunken garden on the campus was first mentioned in correspondence between J.A.C. Chandler and Charles F. Gillette in October 1923.

The plan to omit the construction of the Sunken Garden as included in building plans drawn by landscape artist Charles F. Gillette was first mentioned in the Board of Visitors minutes on February 12, 1924. The Board of Visitors was concerned that Gillette's landscape plan would call for an expenditure of $25,000 to $30,000.

In 1933, Dr. J.A.C Chandler reported that a Civilian Conservation Corps camp had been assigned to the college for the purpose of beautifying and improving the grounds. He recommended that the board again consider the idea of the Sunken Garden. This recommendation was adopted and the president was authorized to employ Gillette to supervise the landscape work. Upon motion duly made and seconded, Gillette's bill for $1,400 for services rendered as architect for the Sunken Garden was approved and ordered to be paid. It was constructed by A.L Phillips Sons between 1935 and 1936.
