= Hugh Blair Grigsby =

American politician (1806-1881)

16th Chancellor of the College of William & Mary
- In office 1871–1881
- Preceded by: John Tyler
- Succeeded by: John Stewart Bryan

Member of the Virginia House of Delegates for Norfolk Borough
- In office December 1, 1828 – December 5, 1830
- Preceded by: Albert Allmand
- Succeeded by: William Maxwell

Personal details
- Born: Hugh Blair Grigsby; November 22, 1806 Norfolk, Virginia, US
- Died: April 28, 1881 (aged 74) Charlotte County, Virginia, US
- Resting place: Elmwood Cemetery
- Spouse: Mary Venable Carrington
- Education: Yale University; College of William & Mary (LLD)
- Occupation: Lawyer, journalist, politician, planter, historian

Hugh Blair Grigsby (November 22, 1806 – April 28, 1881) was an American lawyer, journalist, politician, planter and historian. In addition to representing Norfolk in the Virginia House of Delegates before the American Civil War, he served as the 16th Chancellor of the College of William & Mary from 1871 to 1881.

== Early and family life ==
The son of Rev. Benjamin Porter Grigsby and his wife, the previously widowed Elizabeth McPherson Whitehead, Hugh Blair Grigsby was born in Norfolk on November 11, 1806. He could trace his descent from the First Families of Virginia, including John Blair, who helped to found the College of William and Mary in Williamsburg. He had one half brother, John Boswell Whitehead, who would name a son in Grigsby's honor, although another slightly older nephew would fight for the Confederacy as a VMI cadet. He also had several half-sisters, although both his sister Lucy Grigsby Colton, wife of Dr. Samuel Colton lost three children before dying herself in 1833, and Ellen Frances Grigsby Colton would die five years later. Meanwhile, after receiving a private education suitable to his class, Grigsby traveled north for higher education, attending Yale for two years where he studied law, before returning to Norfolk. He became a devoted fitness enthusiast, boxing and once walking to Massachusetts and continuing through much of New England and up to Canada before returning to Virginia.

In 1840, Grigsby married Mary Venable Carrington (1813-1894), the daughter of Colonel Clement Carrington (-1847) of "Edgehill" plantation, Charlotte County, Virginia. She too could trace her descent from the First Families of Virginia, and her father had been a patriot in the American Revolutionary War before representing Charlotte County in the House of Delegates in 1789. Their son Hugh Carrington Grigsby (1856-1909) would receive a degree from Hampden-Sydney College and eventually inherited Edgehill but never married, so it would eventually be inherited by their daughter Mary Grigsby Galt (1860-1916).

== Lawyer, journalist, planter and politician ==
Admitted to the Virginia bar, Grigsby had a private legal practice near Norfolk, but his growing deafness caused him to turn to journalism. For six years he owned and edited the Norfolk American Beacon. He succeeded Albert Allmand as Norfolk's sole delegate in the Virginia General Assembly, and won election in his own right the following year (so served), and (following the death of an elected delegate) became one of his Tidewater district's delegate to the Virginia Constitutional Convention of 1829–1830. Although some delegates proposed allowing for the gradual abolition of slavery in Virginia, Nat Turner's slave rebellion had just been suppressed, so that proposal was quickly tabled by Tidewater representatives including Grigsby and his colleagues, although the constitution did allow western Virginians additional representatives in the Virginia General Assembly. Decades later (after the American Civil War and the creation of the state of West Virginia), Grigsby would publish a history of that convention, which would later be criticized for anti-Appalachian bias and downplaying western reformers such as Philip Doddridge."

After his 1840 marriage, except for short period in Norfolk, as well as travels within Virginia to deliver historical talks, Grigsby remained at Edgehill the rest of his life, operating the plantation using enslaved labor until the American Civil War, as well as modernizing its agricultural methods. Thus, in the 1850 federal census, Grigsby owned 63 enslaved people. A decade later, on the eve of the Civil War, Grigsby owned 71 enslaved people in Charlotte County, and an additional three in Norfolk (23-year-old Black man and woman and a 14-year-old Black girl).

Grigsby delivered the first on his historical lectures in 1848 at the Richmond Atheneum, concerning the Mecklenburg Declaration of Independence and in 1853 he returned to the state capitol to address the Virginia Historical Society about the Virginia Convention of 1829. Passionate about books and classical art, Grigsby eventually acquired over 6,000 volumes, augmenting his collection with volumes purchased from the library of John Randolph of Roanoke, who was one of his fellow delegates in the Virginia Convention of 1829–30. Grigsby also supported Virginia sculptor Alexander Galt, and owned his "Columbus", "Sappho", "Psyche", and "Bacchante". His last major prewar address concerned Littleton W. Tazewell, delivered before the Norfolk bar on June 29, 1860.

== Career at the College ==
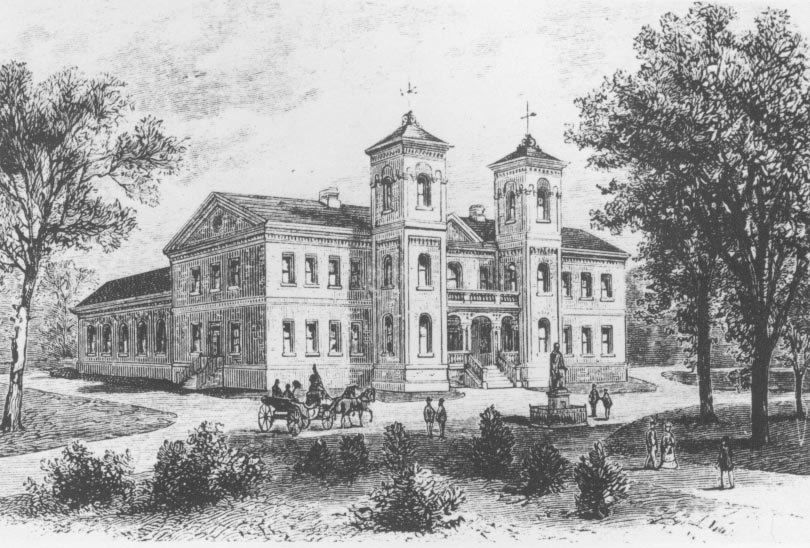
The College of William and Mary Wren Building with Italianate towers, c. 1859

Grigsby, a descendant of the College's first colonial President John Blair, received his Doctorate of Laws from the College in 1855 (addressing the Phi Beta Kappa Society there on July 3, 1855 about the Virginia Ratification Convention of 1788). Later in that decade, Grigsby received a seat on the College's Board of Visitors. In 1859, following a fire that consumed the college's library, Grigsby headed the list of donors for a vested library fund with a $1000 contribution (the 2010 equivalent of $4 million). Around that time, former U.S. President John Tyler, an alumnus and longtime supporter, had been named the College's Chancellor, but Tyler died in January 1861, and the college was closed during most of the American Civil War, particularly as the Battle of Williamsburg was fought nearby in May 1862 during the Union's Peninsular Campaign. College buildings were also used (and damaged) by Union troops during the Overland Campaign in 1864.

Following the Civil War, Grigsby remained on the College's Board of Visitors along with former Governor Henry A. Wise and supported College President Benjamin Ewell (who had used his engineering talents on behalf of the Confederate States Army to construct the "Williamsburg Line") in reinvesting the College's remaining endowment funds in Williamsburg's heritage site rather than relocate the college to Richmond. An elementary preparatory school was established with funds from a colonial fund dating to 1741, awarded by the English Court of Chancery in September 1866. Faculty size was reduced and the Brafferton building was used for most classes, and the President's House also served as a science laboratory.

In 1871, the Board of Visitors selected Grigsby as the College's chancellor, a position which had remained vacant for a decade. The previous year, Grigsby had been elected as President of the Virginia Historical Society. Grigsby held both posts as President of the VHS and Chancellor of W&M until 1881.

Grigsby was an authority on the history of Virginia, and William and Mary had given him the degree of Doctor of Laws (LL. D) in 1855. He contributed to the Southern Literary Messenger, and wrote numerous historical discourses, including one on the Virginia Constitutional Convention of 1829–1830 delivered before the historical society in 1853, another on that of 1776 delivered at William and Mary in 1855, and "Discourse on Littleton W. Tazewell" (Norfolk, 1860).

== Death and legacy ==
Grigsby died at his Edgehill mansion in Charlotte County, Virginia in 1881. His widow and their children would all eventually join him in the family plat at Elmwood Cemetery in Norfolk. His papers are held by the Virginia Historical Society. While the Edgehill plantation house which Col. Carrington had constructed burned in the 1930s, several outbuildings, including the kitchen survive and are on the Virginia landmarks register.

== Books ==
- Grigsby, Hugh Blair. The Virginia Convention of 1776. (1855) Google Books digitalized. also, American Revolutionary War Series. Applewood Books. Bedford, Mass. ISBN 978-1-4290-1760-2 Also, Da Capo Press, (1969) LOC card number 75-75320
- Grigsby, Hugh Blair. The history of the Virginia federal convention of 1788: with some account of some eminent Virginians of that era who were members of the body. Google Books digitalized. Also, Da Capo Press, (1969) LOC card number 70-75319
- Grigsby, Hugh Blair. The Virginia convention of 1829-1830: A discourse delivered before the Virginia Historical Society, at their annual meeting, held in the City of Richmond. (1853) (Google eBook) Also, Da Capo Press, (1969) LOC card number 79-75321

== Bibliography ==
- Heuvel, Sean M. (2013). The College of William and Mary in the Civil War. McFarland & Company. ISBN 978-0-7864-7309-0.
- William and Mary, The College of (2010). The History of the College of William and Mary. Applewood Books. ISBN 978-1-4290-4333-5.
