= Crim Dell bridge =

Wooden bridge in Williamsburg, Virginia

Coordinates: 37°16′14″N 76°42′49″W

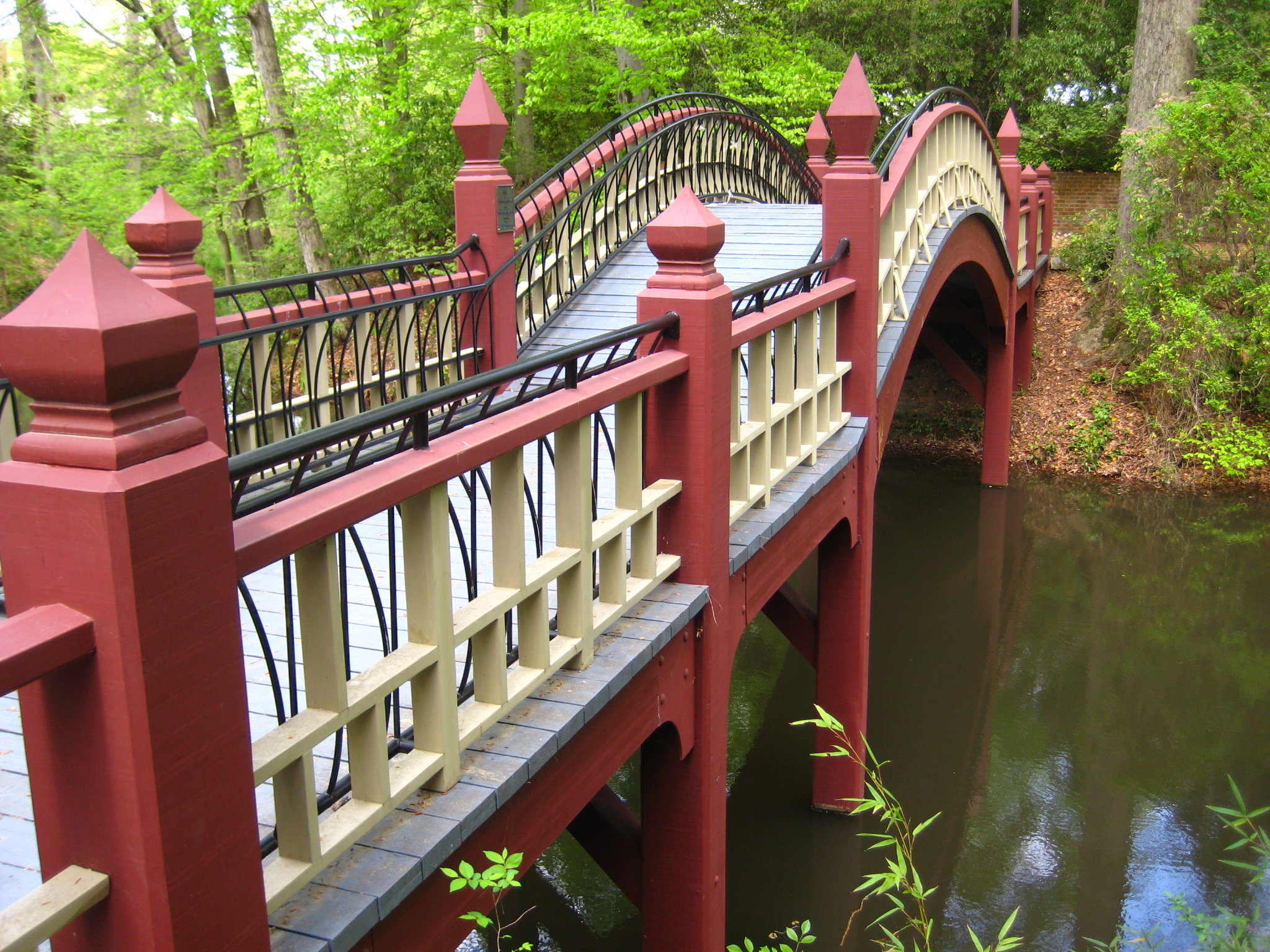
The Crim Dell bridge

The Crim Dell bridge is a wooden bridge on the College of William & Mary’s campus in Williamsburg, Virginia, United States, and is considered one of the College's most visually appealing elements. Crim Dell is the pond that the bridge crosses, but the bridge is commonly referred to as Crim Dell.

== History ==
The bridge was opened on William & Mary's first-ever Parents' Day in 1966. Davis Paschall, the College President at the time, wanted to build a more elaborate bridge than the existing plain, unpainted one. The bridge had spanned a gully in which passersby threw garbage; the pond was created by building a dam near the location of the future bridge. For a short time, the spot was considered as the site for a new library, but this was ultimately rejected.

Crim Dell was funded by three main sources: the 1964 senior class gift, a man by the name of David Reed Baer who was a friend of the College, and the family of John W. H. Crim. Crim was a distinguished alumnus from the College's 1901 graduating class.

On a mounted plaque near the bridge is a quote by Paschall to commemorate Crim Dell's dedication on May 7, 1966 (see picture). It reads:

…that one may walk in beauty, discover the serenity of the quiet moment, and dispel the shadows.

== Traditions and campus legends ==
The Crim Dell bridge and pond are at the center of several campus myths and traditions.

=== Lover's bridge ===
It is rumored that if two lovers cross the bridge together and kiss at its crown, they will be together for life. A similar campus legend is that if someone crosses it alone, they will always be single.

=== Playboy magazine's rankings ===
Tour guides at the College often tell prospective students that Playboy magazine once rated Crim Dell as "the second most romantic spot on a college campus" in America. This rumor has been confirmed as false.

=== Stage 3 of W&M's "Triathlon" ===
One tradition includes William & Mary's own version of a triathlon (aptly called "The Triathlon"). It is a set of three tasks to be completed by each student prior to graduation. These comprise jumping the wall of the Governor's Palace in Colonial Williamsburg after hours, streaking through the Sunken Garden, and swimming in Crim Dell.
