= The Colleges of William & Mary =

- Type: Public
- Active: 1960–1962
- Chancellor: Alvin Duke Chandler
- Location: Virginia, United States
- Campus: Multi-Campus University

The Colleges of William & Mary was the name of a short-lived educational system in Virginia. It included The College of William & Mary, the Richmond Professional Institute, the Norfolk Division of the College of William & Mary, Christopher Newport College, and Richard Bland College.

== Creation ==
In 1960, The College of William & Mary ("The College") had two branch campuses, the Richmond Professional Institute (RPI), which it had operated since 1925, and the Norfolk Division of the College of William & Mary, which it had operated since 1930.

The General Assembly of Virginia passed H.B. 466 creating The Colleges of William & Mary ("The Colleges") on March 3, 1960, and it took effect immediately. The president of The College, Alvin Duke Chandler, was chosen to be the administrative chancellor of the new system, with Davis Young Paschall replacing him as president.

== Operation ==
As chancellor, however, Chandler attempted to manage the day-to-day operations of all five branches of The Colleges and, by doing so, began to alienate the presidents who served under him. The presidents of The College, RPI, and the Norfolk Division were originally to have more autonomy under the new system than they had had in the past. However, Chandler did not allow that to happen. For example, Chandler required Lewis Webb, president of the Norfolk Division, to seek his approval in matters of hiring faculty and staff, granting leaves of absence, reviewing scholarly publications, and budget requests. Chandler also referred to the five college system as his "empire," reflecting his idea of his role at the top. He also maintained an office on the campus of The College, saying that he could not see how "the college chancellor possibly could conduct business away from the campus."

In addition, the Norfolk Division was granted accreditation in its own right from the Southern Association of Colleges and Schools as a four-year college in December 1961 and was renamed the Norfolk College of the Colleges of William & Mary. RPI had been accredited in its own right since 1953. As four-year schools with their own accreditation, the presidents of each began to resent the level of influence Chandler had in their day-to-day affairs and began to look for ways to change it.

== Dissolution ==
The General Assembly decided to split the system into three parts, with The College, RPI, and the Norfolk College each having their own Boards of Visitors and with Richard Bland College and Christopher Newport College remaining under the control of the Board of Visitors of The College of William & Mary. The bill for the dissolution of the system was introduced by Delegate Russell Carneal of Williamburg at the urging of some of the members of the Board of Visitors. However, other members of the Board of Visitors were opposed; there had been a vote of the Board against the dissolution of the system in December 1961. The dissolution became official with the passage of H.B. 156, signed into law by Governor Albertis Harrison on February 16, 1962. It specified that the system would be abolished as of July 1, 1962.

Upon its independence, the Norfolk College became Old Dominion College, now known as Old Dominion University. RPI remained an independent state school until 1968, when it merged with the Medical College of Virginia to form Virginia Commonwealth University. Christopher Newport College remained an extension of The College until becoming independent in 1977, and became Christopher Newport University in 1992. Richard Bland College remains a junior college affiliated with The College.

After the dissolution of the system, Alvin Duke Chandler served as the coordinator for Christopher Newport College and Richard Bland College; however, he resigned this position after only four months. He then became chancellor of the College of William & Mary, an honorary position that dates back to the founding of the College.
