= James Thorpe (academic) =

American academic (1915–2009)

4th Director of the Huntington Library
- In office October 1, 1966 – August 31, 1983
- Preceded by: John Edwin Pomfret
- Succeeded by: Robert Middlekauff

Personal details
- Born: August 17, 1915 Aiken, South Carolina
- Died: January 4, 2009 (aged 93)
- Education: The Citadel (BA, 1936); The University of North Carolina at Chapel Hill (MA, 1937); Harvard University (PhD, 1941)

Academic work
- Discipline: English literature
- Institutions: Princeton University

James Thorpe (born August 17, 1915, in Aiken, South Carolina, died January 4, 2009, in Bloomfield, Connecticut) was the director of the Huntington Library from 1996 to 1983, and a professor of English at Princeton University. He was the author of a biography of the library namesake, Henry Edwards Huntington.

Thorpe served in the United States Army Air Forces from 1941 to 1946, participating in World War II. He earned the rank of colonel and a Bronze Star Medal.

He was awarded Guggenheim Fellowships in 1949 and 1965. In 1976, he was elected to the American Academy of Arts and Sciences. He was later elected to the American Philosophical Society in 1982.

He received a BA from The Citadel, an MA from The University of North Carolina at Chapel Hill and a PhD from Harvard University.

Academic offices
Preceded by John Edwin Pomfret	4th Director of Huntington Library; 1966 – 1983	Succeeded by Robert Middlekauff
