= Thomas Gwatkin =

English cleric and academic

Thomas Gwatkin (1741–1800) was an English cleric and academic. He is known as a Tory and loyalist figure at the College of William & Mary in colonial Williamsburg, Virginia.

== Life ==
He was the son of Thomas Gwatkin of Hackney, Middlesex. He matriculated in 1763, at Jesus College, Oxford, but left university without taking a degree. As a student Gwatkin was an opponent of views of Thomas Secker. In 1766 he was a nonconformist minister at Blackley, but then changed his views. In 1767 he was ordained priest in the Church of England by Richard Terrick, Bishop of London, and became a curate at Stebbing. At this period he was a friend and correspondent of Jeremy Bentham. In 1769 Terrick as chancellor of the College of William & Mary appointed Gwatkin a professor there.

At William and Mary, Gwatkin was in a group of clerics, including his associate Samuel Henley, who opposed the project to create Anglican bishops for American dioceses. The Virginia House of Burgesses supported their stand. A controversy followed that drew in William Willie and Thomas Bradbury Chandler, and others. Defending Henley against the burgess Robert Carter Nicholas, Gwatkin used the provocative pseudonym "Hoadleianus", alluding to Benjamin Hoadley whose opposition to the High Church clergy caused the Bangorian Controversy.

Gwatkin became professor of mathematics and natural philosophy at William and Mary in 1770. In 1773, he was master of the grammar school.

The College of William and Mary was a centre of loyalism in the years preceding the American Revolution of 1776, and Gwatkin and Henley remained in post as hardcore Tories, while American patriots attempted to undermine loyalists there. The politics made for unpleasant friction. The battles of Lexington and Concord in 1775 brought matters to a head, and Gwatkin refused to preach for the disbanded burgesses on 1 June. He also refused, according to his own account, from Richard Henry Lee and Thomas Jefferson, to draw up "memorials in the defense of congress."

Gwatkin and Henley shortly then departed for England, as Lord Dunmore, the last colonial governor of Virginia, was forced out. It followed a menacing incident in which armed men hammered on Gwatkin's door at night. Gwatkin acted as chaplain to Lady Dunmore, and sailed with her and her son on HMS Magdalen, on 29 June 1775.

Gwatkin was awarded a B.A. degree at Oxford by Convocation on 21 May 1778. Admitted to Christ Church, Oxford, he graduated M.A. on 23 March 1781. He was appointed vicar of Cholsey in August 1781, a position he held to 1800. He was also curate at Clehonger, where his uncle Richard Gwatkin was rector of Allensmore-cum-Clehonger. He resided in Hereford, and died on 4 October 1800. He was buried in Clehonger.

== Family ==
Gwatkin married Jane Powle, daughter of John Powle. Richard Gwatkin (1791–1879) the geologist was his son, and father of Henry Melvill Gwatkin.

== Works ==
- Remarks upon the first of Three letters against the confessional (1768), by "a Country Clergyman"
- Remarks Upon the Second and Third of Three Letters Against the Confessional (1768), by "a Country Clergyman"
- A Letter to the Clergy of New York and New Jersey (1772). Gwatkin opposed James Horrocks, over the proposal to create an Anglican bishop in America.
