= Lemuel J. Bowden =

American lawyer (1815–1864)

Lemuel Jackson Bowden
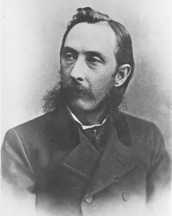

United States Senator from Virginia
- In office March 4, 1863 – January 2, 1864
- Preceded by: Waitman T. Willey
- Succeeded by: John F. Lewis

Member of the Virginia House of Delegates for James City, York, and Williamsburg
- In office December 6, 1841 – April 1846
- Preceded by: John M. Gregory
- Succeeded by: William Howard

Personal details
- Born: January 16, 1815 Williamsburg, Virginia, U.S.
- Died: January 2, 1864 (aged 48) Washington, D.C., U.S.
- Party: Union
- Education: College of William & Mary
- Profession: Lawyer, politician

Lemuel Jackson Bowden (January 16, 1815 – January 2, 1864) was an American lawyer and politician from Williamsburg, Virginia.

== Early life ==
Bowden was born in 1815 in Williamsburg, Virginia, and graduated from the College of William and Mary in 1831-1832.

== Career ==
As an adult, Bowden settled in Williamsburg and practiced law there. He was elected to the Virginia House of Delegates three times, serving from 1841 to 1846.

In 1850, Lyons was elected to the Virginia Constitutional Convention of 1850. He was one of two delegates elected from the Tidewater delegate district made up of Essex, King and Queen, Middlesex and Mathews Counties.

In 1860, he was a presidential elector from his Congressional District.

During the American Civil War Bowden served as mayor of Williamsburg, Virginia from 1862 to 1863 in a region occupied by Federal troops. Following the creation of West Virginia organized by Unionist Virginians in 1863, the Restored Government of Virginia chose Bowden to represent Virginia in the United States Senate in 1863 as a member of the Union Party. There he served until his death.

== Death and family ==
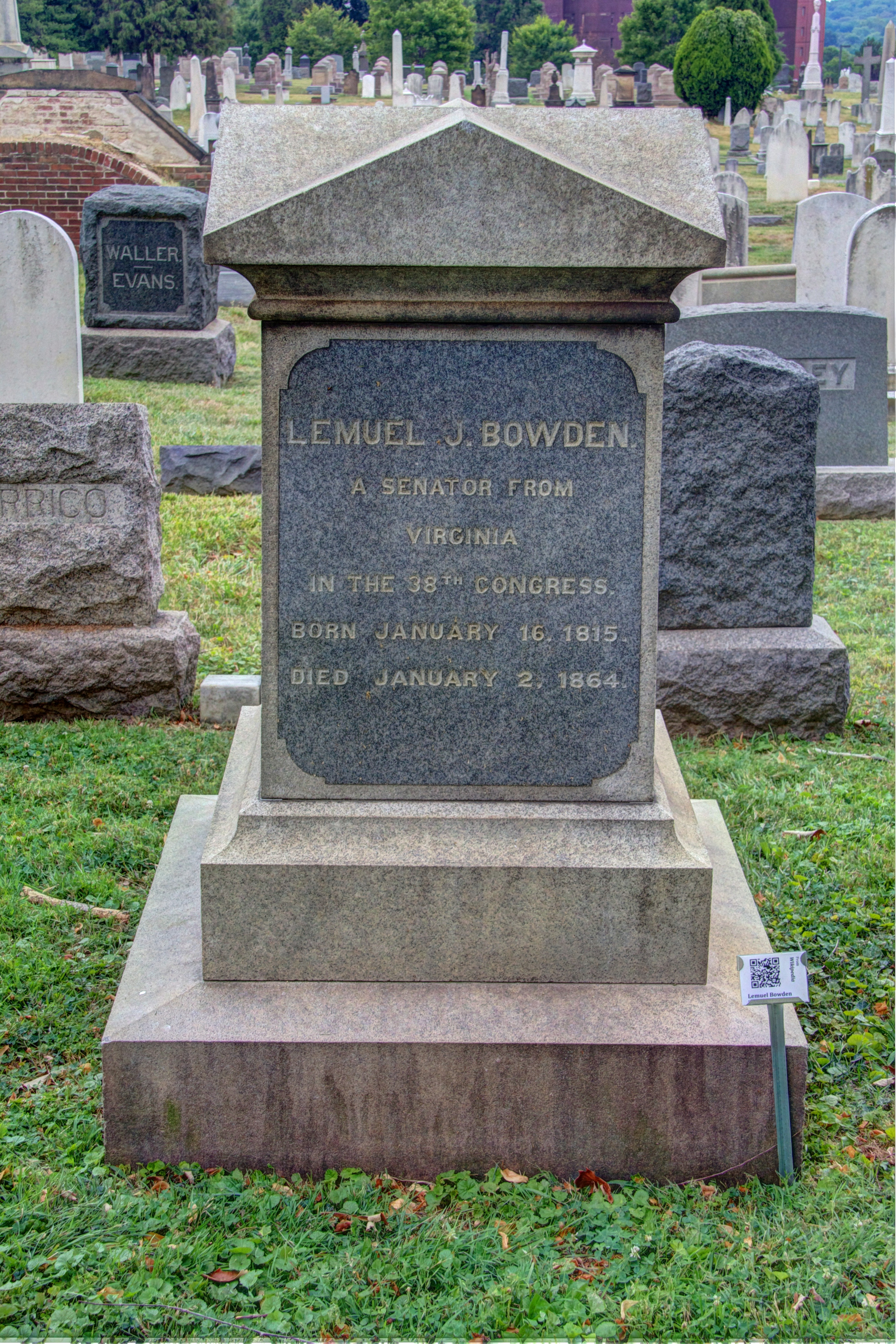
Bodwen's grave at the Congressional Cemetery

Bowden died on January 2, 1864, of smallpox while in office at Washington, D.C. and he is buried in the Congressional Cemetery there.

Bowden's son, Thomas Russell Bowden, served as Attorney General of Virginia in both the Restored Government and the post-war Reconstruction era government, and his nephew, George E. Bowden, represented Virginia's 2nd congressional district in the United States House of Representatives from 1887 to 1891.

== See also ==
- List of members of the United States Congress who died in office (1790–1899)

== Bibliography ==
- "Biographical Directory of the United States Congress, 1774 - Present". bioguide.congress.gov. United States Congress. Archived from the original on April 23, 2010.
- Pulliam, David Loyd (1901). The Constitutional Conventions of Virginia from the foundation of the Commonwealth to the present time. John T. West, Richmond. ISBN 978-1-2879-2059-5.

Political offices
| Preceded by R. M. Garrett | Mayor of Williamsburg, Virginia; 1862–1863 | Succeeded by W. R. C. Douglas |
U.S. Senate
| Preceded by Waitman T. Willey | U.S. senator (Class 1) from Virginia; March 4, 1863 – January 2, 1864; Served alongside: John S. Carlile | Succeeded by John F. Lewis |
