= John Stith =

Virginia colonist

John Stith (fl. 1631–1694) was a member of the Virginia House of Burgesses and the progenitor of the Stith family, one of the first families of Virginia.

== Early life ==
Coat of Arms of John Stith

John Stith was born in Kirkham in Lancashire, England in 1625. Stith ancestors were likely from the Kirkham area.

== Colonial America ==
Stith, the first person in colony of Virginia with that surname, received a land grant in 1652 with Samuel Eale for 500 acres in Charles City County, Virginia, where he settled. He also received 500 acres of land in 1663.

He was a merchant, an attorney, and a justice of the peace, and served in the militia as a lieutenant (1656), a captain (1676), and a major (1680). In 1676, he fought against Nathaniel Bacon during Bacon's Rebellion. Stith was a supporter of Sir William Berkeley. In 1691, Stith was the high sheriff of Charles City County.

== Marriage and children ==
In 1657, Stith married Jane Drury Mosby, the widow of Thomas Gregory and Joseph Parsons, and had five children according to his will:

- John Stith (Note: The father of William Stith, the 3rd president of the College of William & Mary has been identified as John and William.) married Mary Randolph, the daughter of William Randolph, and had three children: William, John, and Mary. (Note: William Stith married Judith Randolph, his first cousin and the daughter of Thomas Randolph (of Tuckahoe), and was the third president of the College of William & Mary. John Stith^{3} was the great-great-grandfather of Brigadier General of the Confederate States Army Junius Daniel and the great-great-great-grandfather of Armistead C. Gordon. Mary Stith married William Dawson, the second president of the College of William & Mary, and had two children including John Dawson, the father of Congressman William Johnston Dawson.)
- Drury Stith married Susannah Bathurst and had at least two children. He was made a Lieutenant Colonel and died in 1741.
- Anne Stith married Robert Bolling (Note: Bolling's first wife, Jane Rolfe, was the granddaughter of Pocahontas and John Rolfe.) in 1681 and had at least seven children.
- Jane Stith wife of Capt. Daniel Luellin
- Agnes Stith wife of Mr. Thomas Wynn

== Death ==
Stith's final will was proved April 3, 1694. He had been living at Westover Parish, Charles City County, Virginia. His estate was divided between his wife, and sons John and Drury. He left money to his daughters Jane, Ann, and Agnes. Before Stith's death, Drury received his third of the estate, which included land on the eastern branch of Herring Creek. John was to receive the land Stith lived on and a mill.
