= William Yates (college president) =

American college president

The Reverend William Yates

5th President of the College of William & Mary
- In office 1761–1764
- Preceded by: Thomas Dawson
- Succeeded by: James Horrocks

Personal details
- Born: December 10, 1720
- Died: October 5, 1764 (aged 43)
- Education: College of William & Mary

William Yates (December 10, 1720 – October 5, 1764) was a clergyman in the Church of England, educator, fifth president of the College of William & Mary and is the namesake for Yates Hall on the College's campus.

== Biography ==
William Yates was born on December 10, 1720, in Gloucester County, Virginia. He died on October 5, 1764, in Williamsburg, Virginia. He was the fourth child and the second son of Rev. Bartholomew Yates, a 1698 graduate of Brasenose College. He was the long term minister of Christ Church parish, Middlesex, Virginia and continued in that place until his death. He was appointed a visitor of William & Mary in 1723, and Professor of Divinity in 1729. His mother was Sarah Stanard, the daughter of William Stanard of Middlesex County, Virginia.

He educated at William & Mary, at which he was elected usher of the grammar school on April 10, 1744. He was ordained by Edmund Gibson, Bishop of London on Apr. 1, 1745. He served as Anglican clergyman at the following parishes: James City Parish, James City, Virginia; Bruton Parish, Williamsburg, Virginia; and Abington Parish, Gloucester County, Virginia. He was also a member of Governor's Council. He ascended to the presidency as the Board of Visitors attempted to wield greater influence over the College. President Yates largely complied with the wishes of the Visitors, and the College expanded the faculty during this time.

He married Elizabeth A. Randolph, who was born in 1724 and died in 1783. She was the daughter of Elizabeth Graves and Edward Randolph. He was the son of William Randolph, a colonist and land owner who played an important role in the history and government of the Commonwealth of Virginia. He and his wife, Mary Isham, are referred to as the "Adam and Eve" of Virginia.

William and Elizabeth were the parents of: Edmund Randolph Yates, who attended William & Mary in 1762; served as a Lt. in Peter Muhlenberg's company 1779.; Elizabeth Yates who married Rev. William Bland, the son of Richard Bland; William Yates, a 1764 graduate of the College of William and Mary and said to have served on General George Washington's staff and was a Colonel in the department of muster-master-general in the Revolutionary War, but not officially reported, however; was Justice, Amelia County, Virginia; and Clara Yates, who married first a Mr. Bland and second Robert Bolling, a First Lieutenant in the Revolutionary War and a great-grandson of the 17th century immigrant Robert Bolling. Another daughter, Lucy Yates, married Rev. Thomas Lundie, rector of St. Andrew's Parish in Brunswick, Va.

Yates is the namesake of a residence hall at William & Mary.

== Descendants ==
- Ellen Anderson Gholson Glasgow, a Pulitzer Prize winning American novelist.
- Roger Atkinson Pryor, was both an American politician and a Confederate politician serving as a congressman on both sides.
  He was also a jurist, serving in the New York Supreme Court, a lawyer, and newspaper editor. Pryor is also known for being a Confederate Brigadier General during the American Civil War.
- Luke Pryor, was a U.S. senator from the state of Alabama
- George Dewey Yeatts. Pentecostal Holiness Preacher
