= Bathurst Peachy =

American basketball coach (1893-1953)

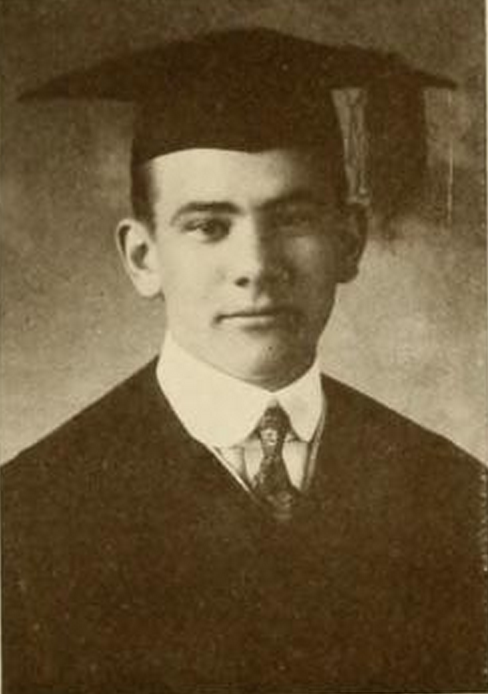
- Peachy pictured as a senior in Colonial Echo 1914, William & Mary yearbook

Biographical details
- Born: July 5, 1893; James City County, Virginia, U.S.
- Died: April 29, 1953 (aged 59); Virginia, U.S.

Playing career
- 1911–1914: William & Mary
- Position: Left fielder

Coaching career (HC unless noted)
- 1918: William & Mary

Head coaching record
- Overall: 5–7

Bathurst Daingerfield Peachy II, sometimes misspelled as "Dangerfield" (July 5, 1893 – April 29, 1953) was the head baseball coach for William & Mary College for just the 1918 season. The Indians, as they were then known, compiled a 5–7 record that year. He graduated from William & Mary in 1914 and was a member of the Flat Hat Club while attending. "Peachy" as he was nicknamed also played four years as a left fielder for the baseball team, winning a championship in 1911 and serving as team captain in 1914.

His father, Bathurst Peachy, was a lawyer in Williamsburg and owned The Millinery Company, a fine goods store.
