= James Horrocks =

English clergyman and president of William & Mary

The Reverend James Horrocks

6th President of the College of William & Mary
- In office 1764–1771
- Preceded by: William Yates
- Succeeded by: John Camm

Personal details
- Died: 1772
- Education: Trinity College, Cambridge

James Horrocks (died 1772) was a Church of England clergyman, rector of Bruton Parish Church, and the sixth president of the College of William and Mary from 1764 to 1771.

Horrocks was educated in Wakefield and at Trinity College, Cambridge, graduating BA in 1755 and MA in 1758. He became Usher at Wakefield School in 1757, but had emigrated to the North American colonies by 1762, when he became Minister of Petsworth and Kingston, Virginia. He combined his presidency of William and Mary with rectorship of Williamsburg, Virginia.

Some of Horrock's contemporaries as leaders of colonial colleges were Miles Cooper, President of King's College; Samuel Finley, President of The College of New Jersey; Edward Holyoke, President of Harvard College; James Manning, President of the College in the English Colony of Rhode Island and Providence Plantations; Dr. William Smith, Provost of the College of Philadelphia; and Thomas Clap, Rector of Yale College.
