= Davis Young Paschall =

American politician

22nd President of the College of William & Mary
- In office 1960–1971
- Preceded by: Alvin Duke Chandler
- Succeeded by: Thomas Ashley Graves Jr.

Personal details
- Born: October 2, 1911
- Died: October 25, 2001 (aged 90)
- Education: College of William & Mary; University of Virginia

Davis Young Paschall (October 2, 1911 – October 25, 2001) was the twenty second president of the College of William & Mary, serving from 1960 to 1971. Prior to that, he served as Superintendent of Public Instruction for the Commonwealth of Virginia from 1957 to 1960, during the state-decreed period of Massive Resistance. During his superintendency public schools in the state were closed by gubernatorial and legislative fiat and subsequently, Dr. Paschall took steps to reopen those schools during the federal requirements. His papers from his time as president of the College of William & Mary can be found in the Special Collections Research Center at the College of William & Mary.

== Death ==
On the 25 October 2001, 23 days after his 90th birthday, Paschall died from natural causes.
