= Richard Bland College =

Public junior college in Prince George County, Virginia, US

- Other names: Richard Bland College of William & Mary
- Motto: The Junior College of the Commonwealth of Virginia
- Type: Public junior college
- Established: 1960; 66 years ago
- Parent institution: College of William and Mary
- Accreditation: SACS
- Budget: $25,091,121 (2023)
- President: Dr. Kenneth Alexander, Interim President
- Provost: Dr. Christopher Kukk
- Faculty: 36
- Students: 2,528
- Location: Prince George, Virginia, United States; 37°9′26.5″N 77°23′54.1″W
- Campus: Rural
- Colors: Green; White
- Nickname: Statesmen
- Mascot: Statesman Eagle
- Website: www.rbc.edu
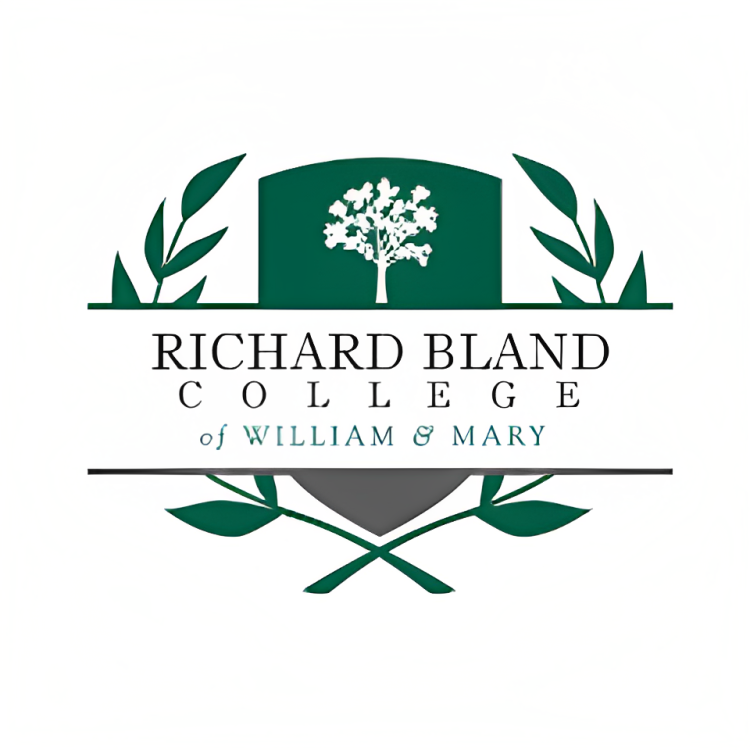

Richard Bland College (RBC) is a public junior college associated with the College of William & Mary and located in Prince George, Virginia. It was established in 1960 by the Virginia General Assembly as a branch of the College of William & Mary under the umbrella of "the Colleges of William and Mary". The "Colleges" system lasted two years. Although the other three institutions such as Christopher Newport founded as colleges of William & Mary became independent colleges and later universities, Richard Bland continued as a junior college of the College of William & Mary until 2025, gaining independence under its own administration and governance by its own Board of Visitors. It was named after Virginia statesman Richard Bland who lived in Prince George County where the East campus is located. The West campus is located in Dinwiddie County.

== History ==
Richard Bland College of William and Mary was established as a higher education institution in 1960 by the General Assembly of Virginia under the short-lived The Colleges of William & Mary system. The college serves as the junior college of the Commonwealth and a branch campus of the College of William and Mary. Its primary mission throughout its history has been to provide higher education opportunities to individuals residing in communities located away from the main campus in Williamsburg, Virginia.

The affairs of Richard Bland College have historically been overseen by the Board of Visitors of the College of William and Mary, which is appointed by the Governor of Virginia. The day-to-day administration and academic programs of the college are led by a president appointed by the board. The college derives its name from Richard Bland, a prominent Virginia statesman and advocate for public rights. He was educated at The College of William and Mary, represented the area where the college now stands during his time in the House of Burgesses and the House of Delegates.

Known for his defense of Virginia's rights, Richard Bland played a significant role in the colonies' struggle against taxation imposed by external powers. He authored An Inquiry into the Rights of the British Colonies, which became the earliest published defense of the colonial stance on taxation. Additionally, Bland served in the Continental Congress and was highly regarded as a political leader and historian of Virginia.

The present campus of Richard Bland College holds historical significance as well. Prior to the American Civil War, the property was a plantation owned by the Gurley family. During the war, the campus became a part of the Union-occupied territory and witnessed two battles—the Battle of Jerusalem Plank Road and the Battle of Globe Tavern. These battles aimed to extend the Union siege lines and capture the Weldon Railroad, crucial for supplying Petersburg. Additionally, around the time of these battles, the 16th President of the United States, Abraham Lincoln, stayed at a tavern, the remains of which are located in the forested foliage of the modern-day campus.

In the early 1900s, the Hatcher-Seward family established a dairy farm on the former Gurley property, and a grove of pecan trees was planted, which would be an iconic part of the scenery for the future Richard Bland College. The land later served as a work camp for conscientious objectors during World War I. In 1932, the Commonwealth of Virginia authorized Central State Hospital to purchase the land, leading to the establishment of the Petersburg Training School and Hospital for African-American Youth. Over the years, the institution underwent several name changes (including: Petersburg State Colony for the Negro Insane, Evergreen Training School, Petersburg Training School, and Petersburg Training School and Hospital) ultimately becoming the Southside Virginia Training Center for the Mentally Retarded before closing in 1959.

Under the guidance of retired Colonel James M. Carson, the former hospital and training facility were transformed into Richard Bland College, with classes commencing in 1961. The campus expanded with the addition of Ernst Hall, a Student Center/Library building, and a gymnasium in the late 1960s. Colonel Carson served as the founding president until 1973 when Cornelis Laban took on the role of Acting President until 1975. Clarence Maze succeeded Carson as president, overseeing the expansion of academic programs and the promotion of international awareness and travel opportunities.

In 1996, James B. McNeer became the third president and played a pivotal role in restructuring the college to fulfill its responsibilities to the Commonwealth of Virginia. Today, Richard Bland College occupies a rural campus spanning 750 acres, which was once a dairy farm owned by the Gurley family. The campus boasts a grove of century-old pecan trees, two restored turn-of-the-20th-century farmhouses (one serving as the president's residence and the other as a guesthouse which is occupied by one of the junior college's administrators), a converted dairy barn used as a theater, and a unique koi pond.

Recognizing the need for residential facilities, the college added campus housing in 2008, becoming the only two-year college in Virginia to offer this accommodation. Richard Bland College has a diverse alumni network comprising more than 18,000 individuals worldwide. Moreover, the college plays a vital role in bolstering the economy of Petersburg, Virginia, and the surrounding regions.

In 2012, Debbie L. Sydow became the fourth (and first female) president of the junior college after a decade of experience as President of Onondaga Community College, a part of the State University of New York system.

Starting in 2014, there have been discussions regarding the establishment of an independent board of visitors for Richard Bland College, separate from The College of William and Mary. These efforts gained support from the Board of Visitors of The College of William and Mary in a resolution conveyed in November 2022. However, the House Appropriations Committee of Virginia blocked the college's independence in February 2023.

== Campus ==
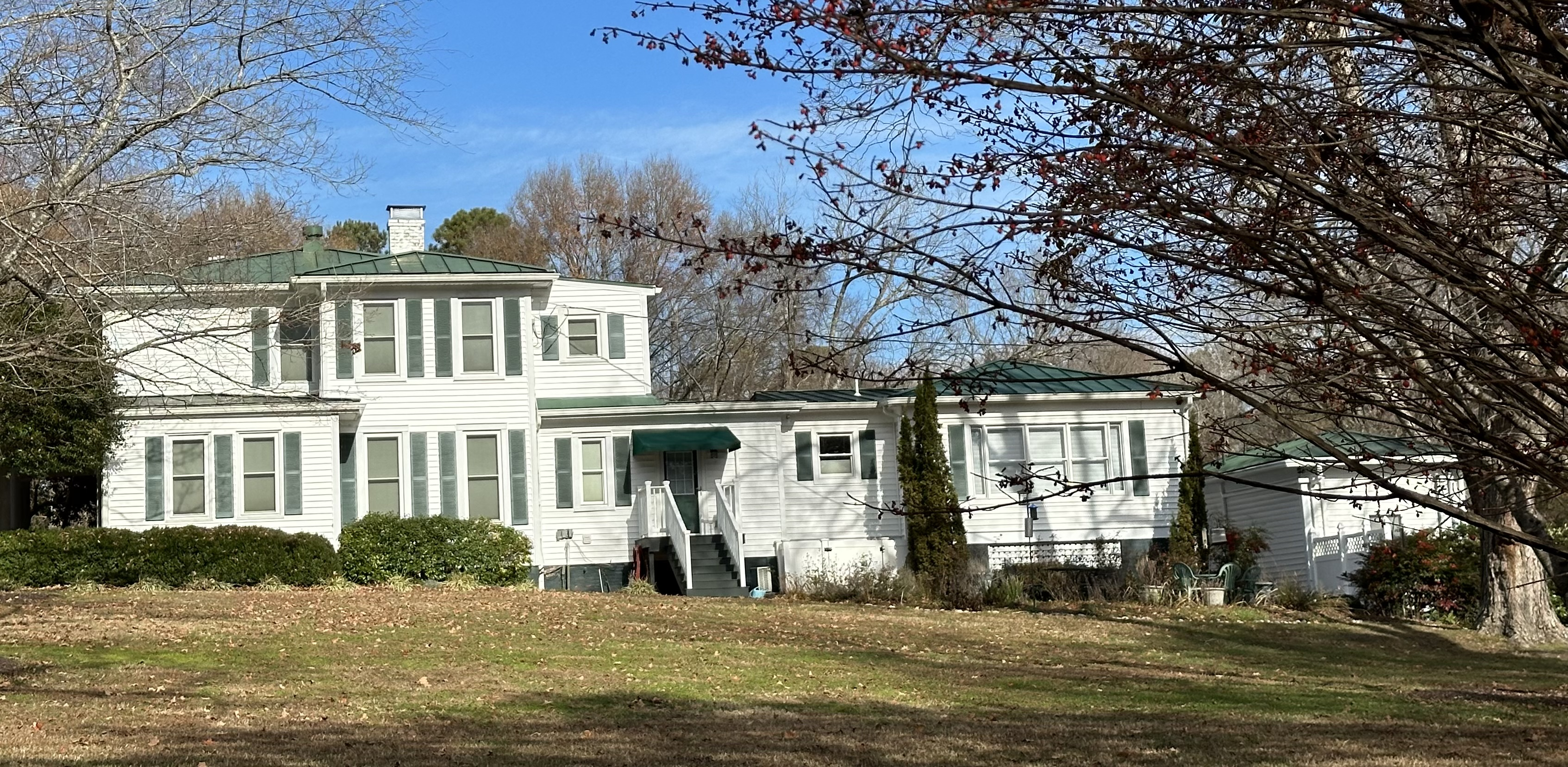
President's House at Richard Bland College, 2023

Richard Bland College of William and Mary has a campus spanning over 700 acres, situated in both Prince George and Dinwiddie Counties, adjacent to the city limits of Petersburg. The rural, park-like campus is split into east and west and offers landscaped grounds with a mix of modern and colonialistic-vintage architecture, pecan orchards, and historical structures, including Maze Hall, the administration building, and the remnants of when the land was under the supervision of Central State Hospital. It also features facilities such as the President's Home, the Guesthouse Residence, a water garden, and various maintenance facilities.

Academic buildings on campus include the McNeer Building, which serves as the main science and technology hub, and Pecan Hall, and Ernst Hall, housing liberal arts and humanities classes.

The campus also encompasses the Barn Theatre, a converted dairy barn serving as the venue for Richard Bland College Players' annual theater productions involving students, faculty, staff, and community members. The campus center is a significant hub, housing the Library, Grove Market, Student Engagement Center, Parson's Cafe, student lounge areas, as well as an ESports Arena and gaming lounge. The Academic Innovation Center (AIC) hosts classrooms, offices, and services related to admissions, student activities, and other student support services. Maze Hall, the administration building, is home to various administrative offices, including those of the President, Provost and Dean of the Faculty, Dean of Administration and Finance, and Director of Institutional Advancement.

Statesman Hall houses the gymnasium, locker facilities, a weight training center, a racquetball court, aerobics classrooms, and faculty offices for physical education and health courses. It also accommodates Instructional Technology Services on the second floor. The campus library offers essential services.

The campus provides housing options in buildings such as Commerce, Freedom, and Patriot Halls. Commerce Hall (formerly the Humanities and Social Sciences Building) is characterized by its arcade walkway and grassy courtyard, which formerly accommodated classrooms and faculty offices for the Division of Humanities and Social Sciences. After 2008, it was repurposed as a student dorm. Freedom and Patriot Halls, on the other hand, offer apartment-style living accommodations. These halls collectively house approximately 500 students.

The campus layout also features a Crim Dell inspired bridge connecting the athletic fields to the Residential Village, offering convenient access for students residing in that area.

== Academics ==
Richard Bland College is a small-sized, residential, public two-year college; it is the only one of its kind in Virginia. It primarily serves as a pathway to a bachelor's degree at the College of William & Mary, although the junior college also contains additional programming to help students transfer to other public universities within the state. Richard Bland College offers a variety of academic programs designed to provide students with a strong foundation in their chosen fields. The college grants Associate of Arts (A.A.) and Associate of Science (A.S.) degrees.

=== Student body and admissions ===
Demographics of student body
| | Undergrad (Fall 2018) | Virginia | U.S. Census |
|---|---|---|---|
| African American | 22% | 19.4% | 12.2% |
| Asian American | 16% | 5.5% | 4.7% |
| White American | 50% | 68.6% | 63.7% |
| Hispanic American | 6% | 6.2% | 16.4% |
| Native American | 0% | 0.4% | 0.7% |
| International student | 2% | N/A | N/A |
| Two or more races | 2% | 2.9% | 1.9% |
| Other/unknown | 3% | 3.3% | 0.4% |

Richard Bland College enrolled 2,528 students in Fall 2021. Women made up 62% of the student body and men 38%. 32% of students at the college are first-generation students and 57% are students of color.

The junior college was the only two-year college within the state of Virginia to grow in enrollment after the COVID-19 pandemic, with its enrollment increasing by 21% compared to the 14% drop that the two-year colleges of the Virginia Community College System suffered.

=== Rankings ===
College Factual in 2023 ranked RBC No. 236 out of 1,330 nationally for associate degree-granting colleges. The publication also listed the college at No. 13 out of 64 for overall value in Virginia and ranked it as the 22nd-best college in the state. Overall, College Factual ranks the school No. 778 out of 2,241 schools in the United States, with it ranking above various four-year institutions.

== Athletics ==
The official mascot of Richard Bland College is the Statesman Eagle. The college's athletic teams are known as the Statesmen, a nickname that reflects the institution's connection to its parent university, The College of William and Mary. The junior college's athletic fields are located on the east side of campus and the Statesmen participate in the National Junior College Athletic Association (NJCAA), at the Division I level and within Region 10. They compete in a variety of sports, with men's sports including baseball, basketball, soccer, and golf, and women's sports including volleyball, softball, and soccer.

== Notable alumni ==
- Kirk Cox, 1981, Virginia politician, 55th Speaker of the Virginia House of Delegates
- Kelly Gee, 2008, acting Virginia secretary of the Commonwealth
- Javaid Siddiqi, 1998, Virginia Secretary of Education (2013–14)
