= John Edwin Pomfret =

American academic and administrator

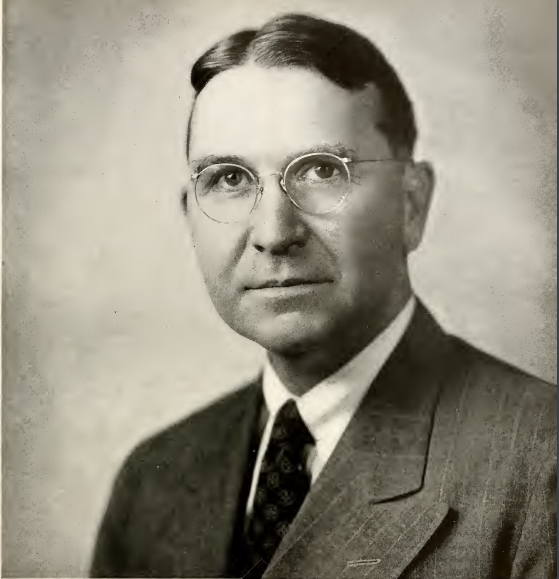
- Pomfret in 1943

3rd Director of Huntington Library
- In office November 1951 – September 30, 1966
- Preceded by: Wallace Sterling
- Succeeded by: James Thorpe

20th President of the College of William & Mary
- In office 1942–1951
- Preceded by: John Stewart Bryan
- Succeeded by: Alvin Duke Chandler

Personal details
- Born: September 21, 1898 Philadelphia, Pennsylvania, U.S.
- Died: November 26, 1981 (aged 83) Camden, South Carolina, U.S.
- Spouse: Sara Wise (m. 1926)
- Children: 1
- Education: University of Pennsylvania (AB, MA, PhD)
- Awards: LL.D., University of Pennsylvania, 1943 -LL.D., University of Chattanooga (now University of Tennessee at Chattanooga), 1949 -LL.D., Mills College, 1958 -Litt.D., University of Southern California, 1966 -Litt.D., Claremont Graduate School and University Center, 1966

John Edwin Pomfret (September 21, 1898 – November 26, 1981) was an American academic and administrator who served as the director of the Henry E. Huntington Library and Art Gallery and the twentieth president of the College of William & Mary.

== Early history ==
John Edwin Pomfret was born in Philadelphia on September 21, 1898. He received his Bachelor and master's degrees at the University of Pennsylvania. His specialty was the history of Colonial America, particularly the Province of New Jersey.

From 1925 to 1934. Pomfret was an associate professor of history at Princeton University. In 1936, he was appointed as an assistant dean at Princeton.In 1937 Pomfret became the dean of Vanderbilt University's Senior College of Arts and Science and Graduate School

== William and Mary ==
In 1941, Pomfret was appointed president of William and Mary. As president, he collaborated with Colonial Williamsburg in the founding of the Omohundro Institute of Early American History and Culture. In 1951, Pomfret resigned from William and Mary in the wake of a grade changing scandal involving the college's football team. The college's board of visitors censured Pomfret for the scandal, although he'd had no knowledge of it. Some board members wanted to force Pomfret out of office since he opposed expansion of the college football program.

== Huntington Library ==
In 1951, Pomfret became the director of the Huntington Library. Due to the scandal at William and Mary, he had offered to withdraw his acceptance of the Huntington offer. After an investigation cleared Pomfret, the Huntington Board told Pomfret that they still wanted him. He served as director until his retirement in 1966.

Pomfret died in Camden, South Carolina on November 26, 1981.

His papers from his time as president can be found at the Special Collections Research Center at the College of William and Mary. A full account of his career and an assessment of his personality by Allan Nevins will be found in Pomfret's festschrift, The Reinterpretation of Early American History, edited by Ray Allen Billington (The Huntington Library, San Marino, CA, 1966).

== Memberships ==
- Phi Beta Kappa (member of senate, 1943–55; vice-president, United Chapters, 1946–51)
- Pi Kappa Alpha
- American Antiquarian Society
- Massachusetts Historical Society
- Franklin Inn Club (Philadelphia)
- Sunset Club (Los Angeles)
- Twilight Club (Pasadena)

== Writings ==
- Pomfret, John Edwin (1930). The Struggle for Land in Ireland. Princeton University Press.
- Pomfret, John Edwin (1935). The Geographic Pattern of Mankind. Appleton.
- Pomfret, John Edwin, ed. (1954). California Gold Rush Voyages. Huntington Library.
- Pomfret, John Edwin, ed. (1954). Twelve Americans Speak. Huntington Library.
- Pomfret, John Edwin (1954). The Province of West New Jersey. Princeton University Press.
- Pomfret, John Edwin (1962). The Province of East New Jersey. Princeton University Press.
- Pomfret, John Edwin, ed. (1964). The New Jersey Proprietors and Their Lands. Van Nostrand.
- Pomfret, John Edwin (1969). A History of the Huntington Library and Art Gallery. Henry E. Huntington.
- Pomfret, John Edwin (1970). Founding the American Colonies. Harper.
- Pomfret, John Edwin (1973). Colonial New Jersey, a History. Scribner.

Academic offices
Preceded by John Stewart Bryan	20th President of the College of William & Mary; 1942 – 1951	Succeeded by Alvin Duke Chandler
Preceded by Wallace Sterling	3rd Director of Huntington Library; 1951 – 1966	Succeeded by James Thorpe
