= List of presidents of the College of William & Mary =

This is a list of the presidents of the College of William & Mary in Virginia, a public university located in Williamsburg, Virginia. The position was created by the charter of the College of William & Mary, which established the college in 1693 and named its first president as James Blair.

== List ==
No.	Image	President	Term start	Term end	Ref.
1		James Blair	1693	April 18, 1743 (Note: Died in office.)	
2		William Dawson	July 18, 1743	July 1752	
3		William Stith	1752	September 19, 1755	
4		Thomas Dawson	November 1, 1755	November 29, 1760	
5		William Yates	1761	October 5, 1764	
6		James Horrocks	1764	June 21, 1771	
7		John Camm	June 21, 1771	Spring 1777	
8		James Madison (Note: Cousin of U.S. President James Madison, Jr. (1751-1836))	October 1777	March 6, 1812	
9		John Bracken	Spring 1812	October 1, 1814	
10		John Augustine Smith	1814	June 1826	
interim		William Holland Wilmer	June 1826	October 1826	
11		William Holland Wilmer	October 1826	early 1827	
12		Adam Empie	early 1827	summer 1836	
13		Thomas Roderick Dew	October 1, 1836	August 6, 1846	
14		Robert Saunders Jr.	June 17, 1847	June 30, 1848	
15		John Johns	July 1, 1849	1854	
16		Benjamin Stoddert Ewell	1854	May 11, 1888	
17		Lyon Gardiner Tyler (Note: Son of John Tyler, tenth President of the United States (1841-1845))	August 23, 1888	June 30, 1919	
18		J. A. C. Chandler	July 1, 1919	May 31, 1934	
interim		Kremer J. Hoke (Note: After Chandler's death on May 31, 1934, Hoke became the interim president until June 30, 1934.)	May 31, 1934	June 30, 1934	
19		John Stewart Bryan	July 1, 1934	January 1, 1943	
20		John Edwin Pomfret	January 1, 1943	September 13, 1951 (Note: Resigned)	
interim		James W. Miller	September 14, 1951	October 8, 1951	
21		Alvin Duke Chandler	October 9, 1951	May 1960	
22		Davis Young Paschall	August 16, 1960	August 31, 1971	
23		Thomas Ashley Graves Jr.	September 1, 1971	January 9, 1985 (Note: Resigned to lead Winterthur Museum and Garden in Wilmington, Delaware.)	
interim		George R. Healy	January 10, 1985	June 30, 1985	
24		Paul R. Verkuil	July 1, 1985	January 7, 1992 (Note: Resigned)	
interim		Melvyn D. Schiavelli (Note: Provost)	January 7, 1992	May 31, 1992	
25		Timothy J. Sullivan	June 1, 1992	June 30, 2005	
26		Gene Nichol	July 1, 2005	February 12, 2008 (Note: Forced to resign)	
interim		W. Taylor Reveley III	February 12, 2008	September 5, 2008	
27		W. Taylor Reveley III	September 5, 2008	June 30, 2018	
28		Katherine Rowe	July 1, 2018	present	

Table notes:
