= Richmond Professional Institute =

Former college in Richmond, Virginia

Coordinates: 37.5481°N 77.4533°W

- RPI seal
- Active: 1917–1968
- Parent institution: College of William & Mary (1925–1960); Colleges of William & Mary (1960–1962)
- Location: Richmond, Virginia, U.S.

The Richmond Professional Institute (RPI) was an educational institution established in 1917, which merged with the Medical College of Virginia in 1968 to form Virginia Commonwealth University. RPI was located on what is now known as the Monroe Park Campus of VCU. The entire history of RPI can be found in "A History of the Richmond Professional Institute" written by Dr. Henry H. Hibbs Jr. From 1925, it was part of the College of William & Mary and, later, The Colleges of William & Mary.

== History ==
=== Beginning (1916–1917) ===
Beginning in October 1916, community leaders, brought together by the Bureau of Vocations for Women, organized the Richmond School of Social Economy to address urban social and health concerns and to be "the first of its kind in the south." The school opened on October 11, 1917, with 30 students, all of whom were women. Of the 30 students, 7 were involved in social work and 23 in public health nursing.

In 1920, RPI opened its doors to both men and women, but the first man did not enroll until 1927.

=== First Building (1917–1919) ===
Reverend Scherer secured the first home for the Richmond School of Social Work on the third floor of an old brick residence in Capitol Square across from the Governor's mansion at 1112 Capitol Street. At the time nothing suggested a professional school, college, or university in the area and on the building the sign read "Richmond Juvenile and Domestic Relations Court."

=== Surviving the Great Depression with no state support ===
In 1925, the school became the Richmond Division of the College of William and Mary because of $10,000 in support given to RPI each year. In the transition to becoming a public institution from 1925 to 1940, the school was one of the few "state-supported colleges" in the country operating almost entirely without state support. The lack of funding was due mainly to a popular belief that Virginia already had too many public universities and that leaders in Virginia believed the only proper location for a college or university was in a small town and not in an urban environment. With the support from The College of William and Mary, it acquired 827 West Franklin Street (now known as Founder's Hall). The building was purchased for $73,000 and $23,000 was needed for repairs. In 1928, the Richmond Division becomes the Richmond Professional Institute of The College of William and Mary. When the Great Depression hit and RPI continued to receive no state support, the federal government stepped in to fill the gap. With the help of the Works Progress Administration, many of the buildings were renovated during the depression. In fact, Dr. Hibbs was quoted as saying,

...if it had not been for the WPA, the Richmond Professional Institute would not have amounted to much. In the days before the legislature made appropriations to RPI the WPA enabled us to survive and even grow a little.

=== School of Art ===
In 1928, Hibbs hired the Richmond born Theresa Pollak as the first full-time art instructor. She founded the School of Art, the forerunner to the VCU School of the Arts. It began as one night class with 8 full-time students the first year and 25 or 30 part-time students. Between 1943 and 1945 Clyfford Still, an important member of the developing world of Abstract Expressionism taught art, and furthered his own distinctive style painting dozens of new works.

When RPI became VCU in 1968, the School of the Arts was the largest professional art school in the country, with 1,200 full-time undergraduate students and 75 graduate students.

=== An Entirely Different College and an Independent State University ===
In 1939 the school was renamed the Richmond Professional Institute of the College of William and Mary. RPI suffered from having a campus with no new buildings and instead consisted entirely of renovated houses. In effort to improve the image of RPI, the first new buildings were created in the 1950s. In 1951, Franklin Street Gym became the first new building on RPI's campus constructed entirely with state funds.

In RPI's 1953 pamphlet, An Entirely Different College, Hibbs defined a professional institute as a college or university that arranged most of its programs of study around occupations or professions. Not abiding to the traditional University system, RPI gained a reputation as a unique institution in conservative Virginia. This uniqueness found its way into many of the art and literature students during the 1950s and 1960s as they adopted the beatnik look and dress style. When George Oliver took over as president in 1959, he did not believe that RPI still needed the name recognition that William and Mary brought. This, along with growing radicalism among the students and faculty of RPI began to sever the relationship with the parent school.

In 1960, RPI became part of The Colleges of William & Mary, a short-lived system consisting of W&M and its associated institutions. However, both RPI and the Norfolk Division of W&M (soon renamed the Norfolk College of W&M) chafed at being part of the system; RPI was already accredited on its own, and the Norfolk College received its own accreditation in 1961.

The Virginia General Assembly dissolved The Colleges in 1962, with RPI and the Norfolk College (now known as Old Dominion University) becoming independent state universities. At the same time, RPI took on the nickname of Rams.

=== Becoming VCU ===
Virginia Commonwealth University was established on July 1, 1968, becoming the first truly urban university in Virginia. In just one year, the new Virginia Commonwealth University was the largest University in the state at a head count of 13,374, of which 12,059 were from the former RPI campus and 1,675 were from the Medical college.

==== Envisioning a Great Urban University ====
At the 1969 convocation for VCU, Dr. Brandt envisioned a great urban University, stating, "we are caught up in a thing you might call the Virginia Commonwealth University Idea. It's an exciting concept....an academic approach without precedent, VCU will become a name that will mean a great deal to you in years to come...as one of the leading educational institutions."

==== VCU's Founding Principles ====
In his inaugural address as VCU's first president, November 10, 1970, Dr. Warren W. Brandt itemized some of VCU's special educational benefits to the urban community which it serves as a responsive citizen.

- Provide special programs for those working on urban problems
- Teach how to live more effectively in the urban environment
- Offer special material to make students aware of urban problems
- Provide a faculty with expertise in a wide variety of relevant specialties
- Furnish a large group of dedicated volunteer workers; faculty, students, and staff
- Provide health care to a large number residents of Richmond and most of Virginia

Three years later, Dr. Brandt echoed this commitment.

We are striving to be a strong institution with significant emphasis on being an urban university-serving the city, the state, and other institutions. We're not trying to be an elitist institution, but to be an institution which meets the needs of the Urban community by accepting a wide range of students into a variety of programs.

== Athletics ==
From 1948 to 1963, RPI's sport teams were known as the Green Devils due to their affiliation with The College of William and Mary.

In 1963, the mascot was changed to the Rams when RPI became an independent institution. The Green Devils color scheme no longer matched, so RPI chose blue and grey for its new school colors on the recommendation of the School of the Arts faculty, evoking Richmond as a combination of North and South. When RPI merged with MCV, the color scheme was changed to the current black and gold of Virginia Commonwealth University.
