= J. A. C. Chandler =

American historian (1872–1934)

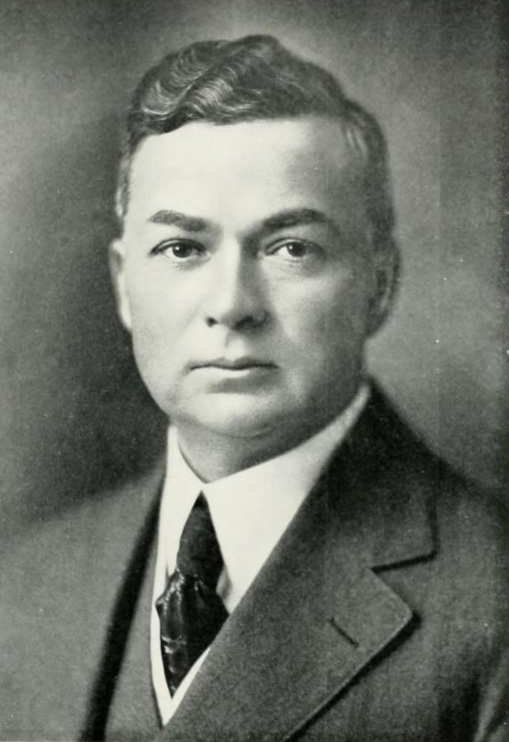
- Chandler pictured in The Colonial Echo 1920, William and Mary yearbook

18th President of the College of William & Mary
- In office 1919–1934
- Preceded by: Lyon Gardiner Tyler
- Succeeded by: John Stewart Bryan

Personal details
- Born: October 29, 1872 Caroline County, Virginia, U.S.
- Died: May 31, 1934 (aged 61) Norfolk, Virginia, U.S.
- Children: Alvin Duke Chandler
- Education: College of William & Mary; Johns Hopkins University

Julian Alvin Carroll Chandler (October 29, 1872 – May 31, 1934), usually cited as J. A. C. Chandler, was an American historian, author and educator. He is best known as the 18th president of The College of William and Mary in Williamsburg, Virginia, where he served as the successor to retiring fellow educator and author Lyon Gardiner Tyler. Dr. Chandler is credited with transforming the institution from a small, struggling liberal arts college for men into a modern coeducational institution of higher learning.

== Early life, education, career ==
Julian Chandler was born in Caroline County, Virginia. He earned both his bachelor's and master's degrees from the College of William and Mary in the early 1890s. He continued his education at Johns Hopkins University, earning a doctorate in history. With his degrees he worked for a school textbook company, taught at both Richmond's Woman's College and Richmond College, and served as superintendent of the Richmond City Public Schools. During his decade as head of schools, he expanded the school system and implemented a progressive model of primary education.

== Accomplishments: modernization, Colonial Williamsburg ==
During most of the years of his tenure, Chandler achieved additional state funding from the Virginia General Assembly. A school of 300 students when he became president in 1919, the school enrolled thousands by the 1930s, although the Great Depression impacted his administration negatively in a manner similar to other institutions.

Chandler's recruitment of Reverend Doctor W.A.R. Goodwin (1869–1939) to head the college's endowment fund-raising duties in 1923 was particularly noteworthy. Dr. Goodwin had served as rector of Williamsburg's Bruton Parish Church from until accepting a call to serve in Rochester, New York, in 1909. The champion of the restoration of the historic colonial Virginia church for the 300th anniversary of the settlement at Jamestown in 1607, which also dates the establishment of the modern Episcopal Church in Virginia.

Upon his return to Williamsburg, Dr. Goodwin, known later as "the Father of Colonial Williamsburg" undertook renewed restoration efforts for buildings on and near the historic college campus, including the Wren Building and its adjacent structures. While working under Dr. Chandler, Goodwin successfully attracted both the attention and support of philanthropist and heir to the Standard Oil fortune John D. Rockefeller Jr. and his wife Abby Aldrich Rockefeller beginning in 1926 with the building of the Phi Beta Kappa Memorial Hall on Jamestown Road. Those efforts resulted in the preservation and restoration of Colonial Williamsburg.

== Death, legacy ==
After a short illness, Chandler died on May 31, 1934, in Norfolk, Virginia, at the age of 61.

During approximately 15 years under his leadership, the College of William and Mary expanded and diversified its programs into prominence in many disciplines. As a former school division superintendent of schools, Dr. Chandler knew of a strong need in Virginia for additional efforts to educate teachers and other professionals for the public schools, especially for more coeducational programs. His greatest legacy at William and Mary is considered by many to be the School of Education, which began a long continuing tradition of providing an education to many of Virginia's public school teachers. In modern times, the School of Education also sponsors summer sessions, as well as seminars and workshops during the school year to enhance opportunities for the continuing education of in-service public school instructional personnel.

Shortly after his death, in Richmond's Northside area, a city where he had served as the Superintendent of Schools, Chandler Middle School was named in his honor. Also named for him is a residence hall at William and Mary.
