= Earl Gregg Swem Library =

Library in Williamsburg, Virginia, USA

Coordinates: 37°16′11.4″N 76°42′58.8″W

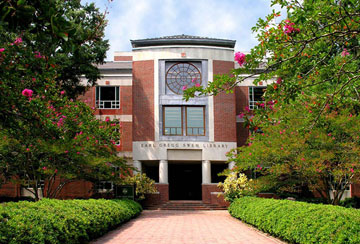
- Location: Williamsburg, VA, United States of America
- Type: Academic
- Established: 1966

Other information
- Website: https://libraries.wm.edu/

The Earl Gregg Swem Library (colloquially Swem Library) is located on Landrum Drive at the College of William & Mary in Williamsburg, Virginia. The library is named for Earl Gregg Swem, College Librarian from 1920-1944. In 2025, the Princeton Review rated William & Mary's library system as the third best in the United States. The ranking was based on a survey of 170,000 students from 391 campuses nationwide.

== Construction and renovations ==
Detailed discussions of plans for the library were held in 1963 and the groundbreaking ceremonies were held later that year on October 11, 1963, at Phi Beta Kappa Memorial Hall. The actual groundbreaking occurred a few weeks after the ceremonies. The cornerstone of the library was laid on October 22, 1964, and the building was scheduled for completion around December 1965. The building officially opened on January 4, 1966, although it was not fully complete. The official dedication ceremony for the library was held on Charter Day, February 12, 1966. The Tucker-Coleman Room of the library was dedicated on November 11, 1966.

At the time of its completion, the ground floor of Swem Library contained the Botetourt Gallery, an auditorium, the Omohundro Institute of Early American History and Culture offices, a rare book room, an honors room, a museum, an audio/visual department, a film preview room, and a faculty lounge. The first floor contained a reserve room, an after-hours reading room, a reference department, and typing and meeting rooms. The second floor contained administration rooms, conference rooms, and stacks. There was a fire in the Botetourt Theater in 1972 that destroyed a projection booth. A Micro Computer Lab opened in the library on February 13, 1984.

Construction officially began on an addition to the front of the library on March 3, 1986, to provide extra stack space, reading areas, administrative offices, and a 24-hour study room and snack area. O.K. James Construction Co. led construction. The addition was dedicated on February 5, 1988. A seven-year renovation and expansion was officially completed in 2005 with rededication ceremonies officially marking the completion on February 5, 2005, during the college's Charter Day weekend.

== Special Collections Research Center ==
The Special Collections Research Center (SCRC) of the Earl Gregg Swem Library of William & Mary defines the history of the university and promotes and preserves the scholarly pursuits of its faculty, students, alumni, visiting scholars, and friends. The SCRC contributes to the college's scholarly reputation by providing the rare books and unique manuscript and archival materials that make primary research possible. The SCRC is located in the Warren E. Burger Special Collections Wing of Swem Library.

=== Manuscripts ===
The mission of the Manuscripts area of Special Collections is to provide primary source material for William & Mary faculty, graduate and undergraduate students, and visiting scholars and researchers.

The Manuscripts Collections are primarily focused on Virginia history from the 17th to the 21st centuries. They include the papers of many famous alumni and individuals who have shaped the course of Virginia and the nation. Among them are:

- Virginia Family Papers including the Blows, the Galts, the Taliaferros, the Tylers, the Blairs, the Robbs, the Carters, and the Armisteads.
- The Tucker - Coleman Collection.
- Local History and Genealogy Collections including the Williamsburg Historic Records Association and the Tyree Collection.
- Distinguished Alumni Papers that include those of Thomas Jefferson.

=== Rare Books Collection ===
The Rare Books Collection is a growing collection that provides research opportunities in many areas of western thought and experience from history to religion and science to art. Like the Manuscript Collections the Rare Books Collection focuses primarily on Virginia history but includes collections that cover many other areas and interests that span the 15th through the 21st centuries.

The Rare Books Collection is actually made up of many distinct collections which each focus on a particular subject area or a particular period in the history of the book. These libraries include:

- The general rare books collection which focuses mainly on Virginiana but contains books on historic gardening, military history, early American culture, travel accounts, science and medicine. There are seven incunabula (books printed before 1501) in the collection.
- Five family libraries in amongst the Rare Books. These are the Skipwith library, the Tucker - Coleman library, the Jerdone Library, the John Minson Galt library, and the John Millington Library. They all date from the 18th and 19th centuries.
- The Francis Nicholson Library is in the process of being acquired by Special Collections. The goal is to recreate the original library of William & Mary given by the colonial governor before the 1705 fire destroyed all but the single volume that is left. More than 80 of the original 150 titles are now in the library.
- The Ralph Green collection on printing and the Joseph Hennage collection on printing and the Carol Beinbrink collection on papermaking total more than 1,400 volumes on the history of the book as an object, with the oldest title being the Quadragesimale by Johannes Gritsch printed in 1479.
- The Ralph H. Wark Collection of fore-edge paintings. Fore-edge paintings are painted on the edges of the leaves of a book so that they can only be seen when the edges are fanned. Carefully rendered paintings like this date almost entirely from the late eighteenth to the late nineteenth centuries in England.
- The Chapin-Horowitz collection of cynogetica. This is the second largest collection of books about dogs in this country and continues to grow through its own endowment. It contains scholarly work that dates back to the sixteenth century as well as children's literature, breed guides, and the records of the American Kennel Club.

=== University Archives ===
The University Archives is the memory of William & Mary, documenting its history from before the founding in 1693 to the present. The wide variety of materials relating to the college and its people through the years includes official records created in the college's daily operations, photographs, publications, video and audio tape recordings, personal papers and books or articles written by or about past or current William & Mary people, newspaper clippings, scrapbooks, and artifacts.

=== Warren E. Burger Collection ===
The Warren E. Burger Collection consists of the lifetime professional and personal papers and memorabilia of the late Chief Justice Warren E. Burger, as well as of related acquisitions, collected by the college. The Warren E. Burger papers were given to William & Mary by his son, Wade A. Burger in 1996. Warren Burger served as the 20th chancellor of William & Mary from 1986-1993.

== Other libraries ==
Besides the main building, Swem Library also has several branch libraries on campus.

=== Branch libraries ===
There are four campus libraries that are part of Swem, but are housed within their respective departments:

- Chemistry
- Business
- Music
- Physics

=== Other William & Mary libraries ===
These libraries are not organizationally part of Swem Library, but, with the exception of the Learning Resource Center, do share the library catalog:

- Henry C. Wolf Law Library
- Learning Resource Center (Education)
- Hargis Library (Virginia Institute of Marine Science)
- Richard Bland College Library
- Philosophy Department Library

== See also ==
- The Throne, a monthly newsletter created by Swem Library staff in order to inform students on available databases and technologies.
