= List of College of William & Mary fraternities and sororities =

The College of William & Mary fraternities and sororities include chapters of national organizations belonging to the Panhellenic Council, the Interfraternity Council (IFC) and the National Pan-Hellenic Council, and also recognizes one local fraternity without Greek letters (Queens' Guard) and the local chapter of one national fraternity (Kappa Sigma) that abandoned membership in an inter-Greek consortium. The school also offers a variety of honor and co-ed service fraternities as well. The first collegiate fraternity within the present borders of the United States, the Latin-letter F.H.C. Society, was founded at the College of William & Mary on November 11, 1750. The new country's first Greek-letter fraternity was founded at the College on December 5, 1776. However, the Phi Beta Kappa society is no longer a social fraternity but is now the leading American academic honor society. Some fraternities and sororities are limited to graduate students at William & Mary, while others may only be joined at the undergraduate level. Still, other Greek-letter organizations operate without recognition or approval from college administrators.

Two social fraternities were established at William & Mary before the Civil War: Theta Delta Chi in 1853 and Sigma Alpha Epsilon in 1857. By the turn of the twentieth century, there were seven social fraternities and by 1940 a total of 14 fraternity chapters and nine sorority chapters had been established at the College. Photographs in early twentieth-century volumes of the Colonial Echo illustrate the variety of houses around Williamsburg used by these organizations, including several houses later incorporated into the Restored Area of Colonial Williamsburg. By 1925 there was an early fraternity row on Jamestown Road with Theta Delta Chi at #216, Sigma Nu at #234, Sigma Alpha Epsilon at #308, and Kappa Sigma at #312.

Between 1927 and 1931 a collection of brick houses was built to house the sororities on the first block of Richmond Road, across from the President's House. Five nearly identical houses face a mid-block interior courtyard and four additional houses front of Richmond Road.

By 1940 the College Terrace neighborhood adjacent to campus hosted six large fraternity houses: Sigma Nu (later Phi Kappa Tau) at 601 College Terrace, Sigma Phi Epsilon (#415), Theta Delta Chi (#606), Lambda Chi Alpha (#607), and Kappa Sigma (#700) on Richmond Road, and Kappa Alpha Order in what is today part of the Alumni House at 500 Richmond Road. For many years Pi Lambda Phi was housed at 230 Griffin Avenue, Pi Kappa Alpha at 205 Richmond Road, and Sigma Pi in the southern annex of Reves Hall. World War II decimated male student enrollment and challenged fraternity operations. In 1943 the College forced all fraternities to surrender their houses to help address a war-related housing shortage.

Male enrollment rebounded after the war and the surviving fraternities petitioned the College to provide meeting spaces to support the social organizations. In 1948 eleven small lodges were constructed in the woods on the then-western edge of campus for this purpose. The lodges were subsequently used for faculty offices and upperclassmen housing.

By the 1960s the College desperately needed additional housing and the fraternities had outgrown the lodges. Two residential complexes were built in the woods on the then-western edge of campus for Greek organizations. Both were designed as dormitories with large meeting rooms and outdoor terraces. The Fraternity Complex opened in 1968 comprising three buildings containing a total of twelve semi-detached "houses" or units. These buildings have now been converted into freshman dormitories known as the Green and Gold Village. What is now known as the Botetourt Complex opened in 1973 to relocate the women's organizations from Sorority Court. Comprising five buildings containing nine units the complex never hosted sororities.

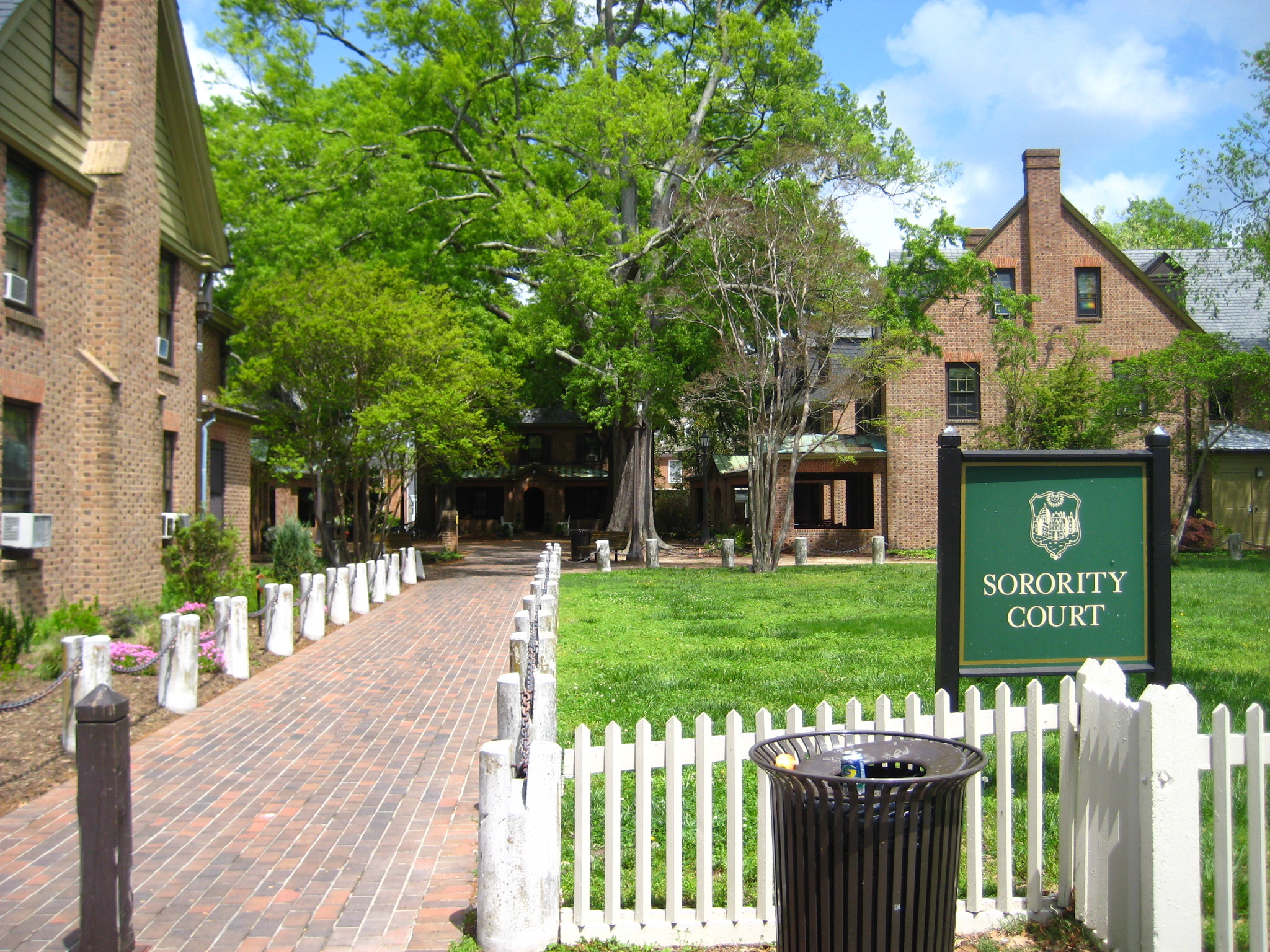
The main entrance to Sorority Court at William & Mary

At the end of the 2007–08 academic calendar year, 25% of undergraduate men and 27% of undergraduate women participated in the Greek system. The average fraternity size was 38 members, while the average sorority size was seventy members.

In the Autumn of 2013, eleven new fraternity houses and a Greek community center were opened. Each of the new houses accommodates seventeen men. After the new fraternity buildings were opened, Delta Phi acquired one of the eleven new fraternity houses, and Alpha Epsilon Pi took over Delta Phi's old house on Armistead Avenue.

== NAIC social fraternities ==
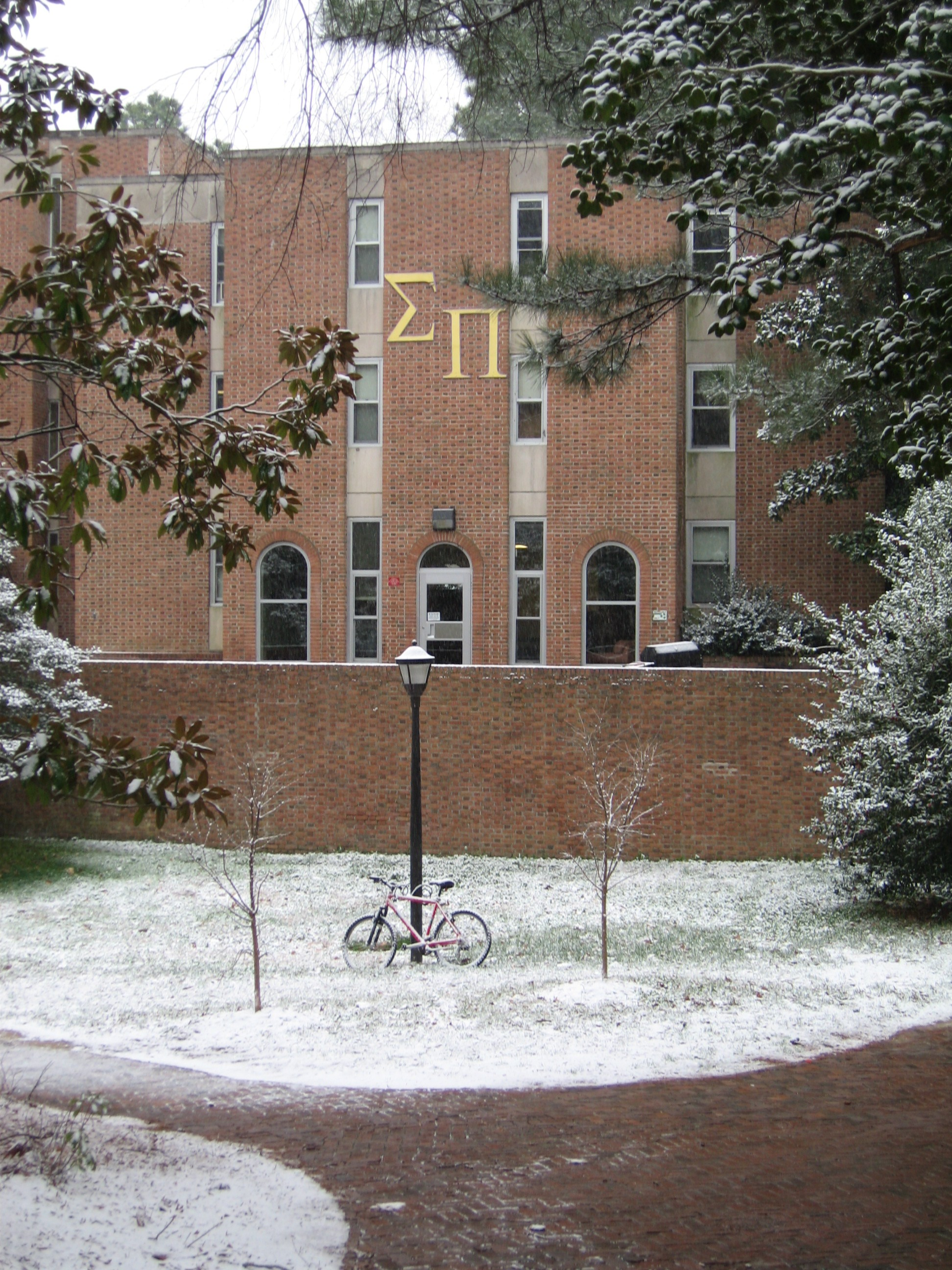
Sigma Pi fraternity's former unit at William & Mary, which now serves as a freshman dorm.

Following is a list of William & Mary's North American Interfraternity Conference social fraternities with year of local establishment.

=== Active fraternities ===
- Theta Delta Chi (ΘΔΧ) 1853
- Sigma Alpha Epsilon (ΣΑΕ) 1857
- Kappa Alpha Order (ΚΑ) 1890
- Sigma Phi Epsilon (ΣΦΕ) 1904
- Sigma Pi (ΣΠ) 1931
- Sigma Chi (ΣΧ) 1968
- Psi Upsilon (ΨΥ) 1984
- Kappa Delta Rho (ΚΔΡ) 1993
- Delta Chi (ΔΧ) 2002
- Alpha Tau Omega (ΑΤΩ) 2006
- Alpha Epsilon Pi (ΑΕΠ) 2007
- Phi Gamma Delta (ΦΓΔ) 2018
- Alpha Sigma Phi (ΑΣΦ) 2020
- Pi Kappa Alpha (ΠΚΑ) (Note: Chapter suspended in 2019, re-founded in 2024) 1871

=== Suspended or inactive fraternities ===
- Beta Theta Pi (ΒΘΠ) 1876 (Note: Chapter suspended in 2026.)
- Kappa Sigma (ΚΣ) 1890 (Note: Chapter suspended in 2024.)
- Sigma Nu (ΣΝ) 1922
- Phi Kappa Tau (ΦΚΤ) (Note: Chapter inactive since 2019.) 1926
- Lambda Chi Alpha (ΛΧΑ) (Note: Chapter inactive since 2022.) 1927
- Phi Alpha (ΦΑ) 1927
- Pi Lambda Phi (ΠΛΦ) 1929
- Alpha Phi Delta (ΑΦΔ) 1930
- Delta Phi (ΔΦ) (Note: Chapter suspended since 2020.) 1987
- Chi Phi (ΧΦ) (Note: Chapter inactive since 2015.) 2009

== Panhellenic social sororities ==
Following is a list of William & Mary's National Panhellenic Conference sororities with a year of local establishment.

- Chi Omega (ΧΩ) 1921
- Kappa Alpha Theta (ΚΑΘ) 1922
- Kappa Kappa Gamma (ΚΚΓ) 1923
- Pi Beta Phi (ΠΒΦ) 1925
- Phi Mu (ΦΜ) 1926
- Alpha Chi Omega (ΑΧΩ) 1927
- Delta Delta Delta (ΔΔΔ) 1928
- Kappa Delta (ΚΔ) 1928
- Gamma Phi Beta (ΓΦΒ) 1934
- Delta Gamma (ΔΓ) 1982

== National Pan-Hellenic Council fraternities and sororities ==
Following is a list of William & Mary's National Pan-Hellenic Council fraternities and sororities with year of local establishment.

- Alpha Phi Alpha (ΑΦΑ) 1975
- Delta Sigma Theta (ΔΣΘ) 1976
- Alpha Kappa Alpha (ΑΚΑ) 1981
- Zeta Phi Beta (ΖΦΒ) 1982
- Kappa Alpha Psi (ΚΑΨ) 1992
- Phi Beta Sigma (ΦΒΣ) 2008
- Omega Psi Phi (ΩΨΦ) 2010
- Sigma Gamma Rho (ΣΓΡ) 2020

== Multicultural Greek Council fraternities and sororities ==
Following is a list of William & Mary's multicultural fraternities and sororities with year of local establishment.

- Sigma Iota Alpha (ΣΙΑ) 2013
- Delta Phi Omega (ΔΦΩ) (Note: Inactive since 2019.) 2016
- alpha Kappa Delta Phi (αΚΔΦ) 2026
- Lambda Upsilon Lambda (ΛΥΛ) (Note: First approved for expansion in 2016. Second expansion effort began in 2024.) 2026

== Honor and service fraternities and sororities ==
Following is a list of William & Mary's honor and service fraternities and sororities.

- Alpha Kappa Psi (ΑΚΨ) – co-ed professional business fraternity
- Alpha Lambda Delta (ΑΛΔ) – co-ed freshman year honor society
- Alpha Phi Omega (ΑΦΩ) – co-ed service fraternity
- Alpha Psi Omega (ΑΨΏ) – co-ed theatre fraternity
- Beta Gamma Sigma (ΒΓΣ) – co-ed business fraternity
- Delta Omicron (ΔΟ) – co-ed music fraternity
- Eta Sigma Phi (ΗΣΦ) – co-ed classical honor society
- Kappa Delta Pi (ΚΔΠ) – co-ed international education honor society
- Nu Kappa Epsilon (NKE) – female-only music sorority (Note: Sorority was founded at William & Mary.)
- Phi Alpha Delta (ΦΑΔ) – co-ed professional law fraternity
- Phi Alpha Theta (ΦΑΘ) – co-ed history honor society
- Phi Beta Delta (ΦΒΔ) – co-ed international studies honor society
- Phi Beta Kappa (ΦΒΚ) – co-ed academic honor society (Note: This fraternity originated at William & Mary in 1776.)
- Phi Eta Sigma (ΦΗΣ) – co-ed freshman honor society
- Phi Mu Alpha (ΦΜΑ) – male-only musical social fraternity
- Phi Sigma Pi (ΦΣΠ) – co-ed academic honor society
- Pi Delta Phi (ΠΔΦ) – co-ed French honor society
- Pi Gamma Mu (ΠΓΜ) – co-ed social sciences honor society*
- Pi Sigma Alpha (ΦΣΑ) – co-ed political science honor society
- Psi Chi (ΨΧ) – co-ed psychology honor society
- Sigma Delta Pi (ΣΔΠ) – co-ed Spanish honor society
- Sigma Gamma Epsilon (ΣΓΕ) – co-ed earth sciences honor society
- Queens' Guard (QG) – co-ed military fraternity
