= NKE =

NKE or nke may refer to:

- Duke language (ISO 639-3 code nke)
- Nagkahiusang Kusog sa Estudyante, a political party and mass organization in the University of the Philippines Cebu College
- "No known enemies," forensic and police jargon for a homicide without an obvious perpetrator
- The New York Stock Exchange code for Nike corporation
- Nu Kappa Epsilon, music sorority founded at the College of William and Mary in 1994
