= WMTV (College of William & Mary) =

Student-run television station in Williamsburg, Virginia

William & Mary Television (WMTV)
- Type: Internet television network
- Country: United States
- Owner: The College of William & Mary
- Official website: https://www.youtube.com/c/WMTV1693/featured

WMTV (or William & Mary Television) is the student-run television station at the College of William & Mary in Williamsburg, Virginia, United States. It plays syndicated television shows, movies and original student-created productions. It was founded in 2001 by Ross Johnston as a spin-off of the College's Student Information Network.

The station can be seen on campus cable channel 53 and on its YouTube channel.

Everyday Gourmet, the flagship production of the station, was featured in USA Today in 2009.

In 2019, the station produced its first ever zine, called Ramble On, which is a digital comedy-oriented arts & culture magazine. Sections include film, television, opinion, food, literature, news, music, and art. The zine has since published once a month, including during the time of COVID-19.

The station also occasionally collaborates with other clubs for one-off videos or series, working with groups like the William & Mary Theater Department, Trippin' on Brix, and Gentlemen of the College.

== Current shows ==
=== WMTV productions ===
As of September 2020, WMTV produces ten shows.

- The C Word – WMTV's newest program, a late night style female comedy program that utilizes current events and topical jokes. It moved from production in Swem Library to virtual production in bath tubs, cars, and childhood bedrooms at the time of school closures due to COVID-19. It is currently the most popular program of WMTV.
- Everyday Gourmet – WMTV's longest-running program, a cooking show where students prepare budget-friendly dishes in dorm room kitchens. Featured in USA Today in 2009.
- Ghostburg – A scripted show, created as comedy about ghost-hunters in Virginia, that is now a mixture of comedy, fantasy and suspense in the style of The Twilight Zone.
- I Punch Gravity – A sketch comedy show, most well known for its 2012 parody of actor Jared Leto, aptly titled The Diary of Jared Leto.
- Saturday Night Tribe -- a sketch comedy show in the style of Saturday Night Live
- The Flat Hat Insider – Created in February 2012 in collaboration with William & Mary's official student newspaper The Flat Hat. Provides a recap of weekly local and national news as reported by The Flat Hat. A special election series of The Flat Hat Insider was launched during fall 2012, featuring biweekly debates between the Presidents of the William & Mary Young Democrats and College Republicans.
- Trendspotters – Fashion segment created in Spring 2011, providing style advice and style profiles of William & Mary students. Collaborations have included ROCKET student fashion magazine, The Gentlemen of the College and The Stairwells a cappella groups.
- 'Tribal Fever Sports Minute' – Provides scores, commentary and highlights from William & Mary Tribe Athletics.
- Tribe Choices @ the Movies – (Also, TC@TM) A movie-review segment featuring both new films and old favorites.
- Tribe Update – Highlights special events and happenings on campus. Notable programs have included interviews with CNN's John King and 24th Chancellor of The College of William and Mary Robert Gates, as well as special coverage of the 14th Dalai Lama's visit to the College.
