= College of William & Mary School of Education =

The College of William & Mary School of Education
- Type: Public
- Established: 1961
- Dean: Robert C. Knoeppel
- Location: Williamsburg, Virginia, USA; 37°16′41.7″N 76°43′17″W
- Website: School of Education

The College of William & Mary School of Education is a program offered at both undergraduate and graduate levels of study at the College of William & Mary in Williamsburg, Virginia, United States. It accounts for one-third of all master's degrees and over one-half of all doctoral degrees at The college. Professional education programs are accredited by the Virginia Department of Education, and the School of Education itself is accredited by NCATE. The School of Education was ranked among the top 50 nationally in a survey of doctoral degree granting schools of education by U.S. News & World Report's Best Graduate Schools Guide 2007 edition. It also utilizes its own library, the School of Education Library.

== History ==
Although the college has a long history of providing teacher education, even effectively hosting the first student teacher in America when a Maryland teacher in 1690 received mentoring from a college instructor in improving his own teaching, The College of William & Mary School of Education did not become a distinct entity until 1961. 11 years after its separation, the SOE awarded its first doctoral degree. Presently, the School offers a liberal arts education and seeks to fuse undergraduate and graduate learning together.
