= Susan Wise Bauer =

American author and academic (born 1968)

- Born: 1968 (age 57–58)
- Occupation: Author

Susan Wise Bauer (born 1968) is an American author, English instructor of writing and American literature at The College of William and Mary, and founder of Well-Trained Mind Press (formerly Peace Hill Press).

== Early life and education ==
Susan Wise Bauer was born on August 8, 1968, in Chelsea, Massachusetts. She grew up on a farm in Virginia, as the daughter of Jessie and James Wise. Her father was a pediatrician, and her mother was an educator. She and her two siblings received a homeschool education starting in the 1970s.

Bauer holds a Master of Divinity from Westminster Theological Seminary in Philadelphia, Pennsylvania, a Master of Arts in English and a Ph.D. in American Studies from The College of William and Mary. She received her B.A. from Liberty University. She has been a member of the English faculty at William and Mary since 1993. She married Peter John Bauer, a pastor, in 1990.

== Career ==
Although she had written and published two novels in the 1990s, Bauer drew much wider attention in 1999 with the publication of The Well-Trained Mind: A Guide to Classical Education at Home, published by W. W. Norton, which was well reviewed and quickly became one of the primary sources for homeschooling families who wished to focus on classical education, sometimes also referred to as the Trivium or the Great Books movement. Bauer followed up The Well-Trained Mind in 2003 with The Well-Educated Mind: A Guide to the Classical Education You Never Had, also published by Norton. Along with several volumes in the History of the World series, Bauer has also written children's books and The Art of the Public Grovel: Sexual Sin and Public Confession in America, published by Princeton University Press in 2008.

Along with her best-selling books on education and history, Bauer was also a contributing editor for the defunct journal Books & Culture. Her essays on literature and American religion have been cited by such diverse authors as Randall Balmer and Jennifer Harris, and have also appeared in a number of anthologies.

Her works have been translated and published in Korea by Theory & Praxis and Goldenbough/Minums; in the Netherlands by Uitgeverij Mozaiek (Zoetermeer); in Spain by Paidos; in China by Peking University Press; in Indonesia by Elex Media Komputindo; in Russia by AST Publishing Group; in Serbian by Laguna and in Bulgaria by Prozorets.

Bauer has homeschooled her four children, and lives with her husband on a family farm in Charles City, Virginia. She offers positive perspectives towards religion and homeschooling in some of her work, and is considered to be a leader in the homeschooling movement.

== Works ==
- Bauer, Susan Wise (1996). The Revolt. Word Publishing.
- Bauer, Susan Wise (1998). Though the Darkness Hide Thee. Multnomah Press.
- Bauer, Susan Wise (1999). The Well-Trained Mind: A Guide to Classical Education at Home. W. W. Norton. ISBN 978-0-393-06708-8.
- Bauer, Susan Wise (2003). The Well-Educated Mind: A Guide to the Classical Education You Never Had. W. W. Norton. ISBN 0-393-05094-7.
- Bauer, Susan Wise (2006). The Story of the World Volume 1: Ancient Times Revised Edition. W.W. Norton. ISBN 978-1-933339-00-9.
- Bauer, Susan Wise (2007). The Story of the World Volume 2: The Middle Ages Revised Edition. Well-Trained Mind Press. ISBN 9781942968016.
- Bauer, Susan Wise (2007). The History of the Ancient World: From the Earliest Accounts to the Fall of Rome. W. W. Norton. ISBN 978-0-393-05974-8.
- Bauer, Susan Wise (2008). The Art of the Public Grovel: Sexual Sin and Public Confession in America. Princeton University Press. ISBN 978-0-691-17082-4.
- Bauer, Susan Wise (2010). The History of the Medieval World: From the Conversion of Constantine to the First Crusade. W. W. Norton. ISBN 978-0-393-05975-5.
- Bauer, Susan Wise (2013). The History of the Renaissance World: From the Rediscovery of Aristotle to the Conquest of Constantinople. W. W. Norton. ISBN 978-0-393-05976-2.
- Bauer, Susan Wise (2015). The Story of Western Science: From the Writings of Aristotle to the Big Bang Theory. W. W. Norton. ISBN 978-0-393-24326-0.
- Bauer, Susan Wise (2018). Rethinking School: How to take Charge of Your Child's Education. W. W. Norton. ISBN 978-0-393-28596-3.
- Bauer, Susan Wise (2020). The Story of the World Volume 3: Early Modern Times Revised Edition. Well- Trained Mind Press. ISBN 9781945841699.
- Bauer, Susan Wise (2021). The Story of the World Volume 4: The Modern Age Revised Edition. Well-Trained Mind Press. ISBN 9781945841910.
- Bauer, Susan Wise (2026). The Great Shadow: A History of How Sickness Shapes What We Do, Think, Believe, and Buy. St. Martin's Press. ISBN 9781250272911.
