= The Gentlemen of the College =

American Tenor/Bass a cappella group

- Origin: College of William & Mary in Williamsburg, Virginia, U.S.
- Genre: Collegiate a cappella
- Years active: 1990–present
- Members: Luke Mitchell '27; Jeremiah Esteban '27; Morgan Cook '28; Owen Smith '28; Evan McMahon '28; Sean Conner '28; George Solari '27; August Taylor '27; Bo Chatterjee '29; Reilly Radzville '29; David Severns '28; Luca Kuhn '29; Drew Erbrecht '30; Everett Benchich '30; Paul Tranquillo '30
- Website: www.gentlemenofthecollege.com

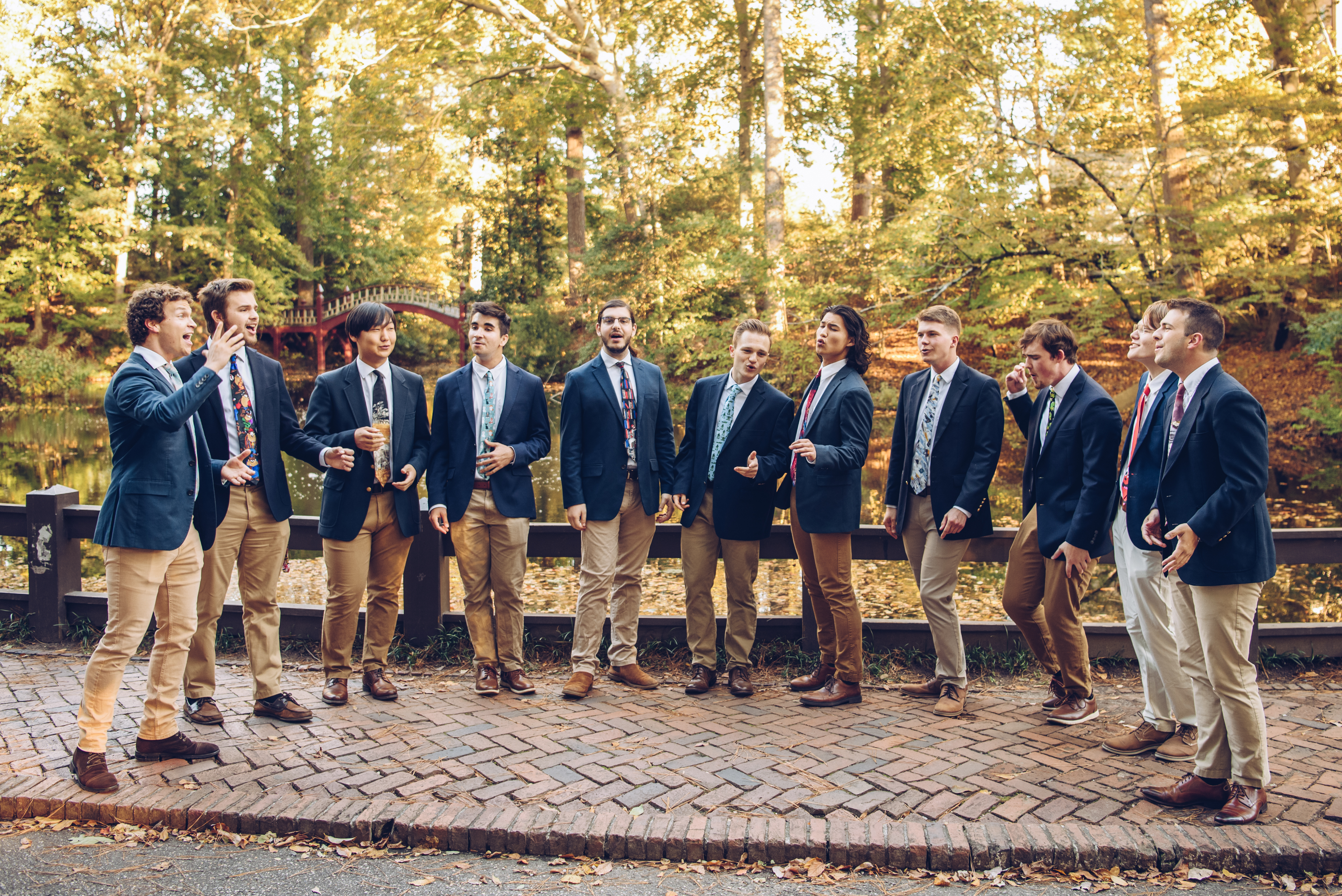
The Gentlemen of the College in the 2023 Fall Semester performing during Homecoming Weekend at the College of William & Mary

The Gentlemen of the College is a Tenor/Bass singing group, and the oldest Tenor/Bass a cappella group at the College of William & Mary. Founded in 1990 the Gentlemen started out as a men's choir that concentrated in barbershop and traditional pieces—a repertoire that has since evolved to encompass a large selection of contemporary music. Known for their navy blazers, khaki pants, and novelty ties, the Gentlemen perform at the collegiate, local, and national level.

The Gentlemen usually field four 'fixed' concerts per year—a Homecoming concert in the Sadler Center, Two "Wren 10"s on the portico of the Wren Building, and a final concert in Phi Beta Kappa Memorial Hall Additionally, the Gentlemen have performed on national television, at The White House, The Capitol the Waldorf Astoria, and for Queen Elizabeth II of the United Kingdom. The Gentlemen have 22 studio CDs in their discography, having just released their most recent album, Following Suit, in 2025.

== History ==
Co-founded in 1990 by Douglas Stambler ('92) and Mike Fitch ('93), the original group had a passion for barbershop. The Gentlemen of the college has been an active part of the William and Mary community for over thirty years. Usually consisting of 10-15 members, The Gentlemen have biannual auditions with the rest of the William and Mary a cappella Council.

=== Performances ===
The Gentlemen integrate a lively and humorous performance style with their repertoire—a style shown through their Homecoming and Final concerts. Respectively taking place at the Sadler center and Phi Beta Kappa Memorial Hall, concerts are punctuated with skits. A 'final video', a Gentlemen-acted spoof of the year's blockbuster, is shown during final concert.

The Gentlemen perform a 'Wren Ten', an arch sing, once per semester. Congregating on the Wren Portico, the Gentlemen showcase the semester's new songs, introduce the new members, and produce a skit. The Wren Ten performances are sometimes themed—traditionally, the Gentlemen dress up in costumes for their fall Wren 10 (falling usually around Halloween weekend).

The Gentlemen of the college also perform for campus-wide events. Amongst the list, they usually sing at Admitted Students Day, Charter Day, the Yule Log ceremony and others. They also sing for private events, including Greek life, business meetings, and for special guests. Additionally, they are often found performing in Colonial Williamsburg.

=== Uniform ===
Since its inception, The Gentlemen of the College have maintained a uniform that they wear at all performances. This consists of a navy blazer, a pair of khaki pants, and a novelty "silly" tie. The latter part of this uniform is especially important to the group. It signifies the relaxed, humorous side of the Gentlemen; a balance to the otherwise formal wear. Each member supplies their own novelty tie(s) that they wear for four years, adding to the history of the group. During their holiday performances, the Gentlemen don holiday apparel and winter scarfs.

== Discography ==
=== Standard repertoire ===
- Following Suit (2025)
- Meet Me At Paul's (2022)
- Our Very Best (So Far) (2022)
- Shenanigans (2019)
- College Ruled (2016)
- Night On The Town (2014)
- Blending In (2014)
- Escape From Coney Island (2012)
- Shoes to Fill (2010)
- Untucked (2008)
- Jacket Required (2006)
- The High Road (2004)
- The Ties That Bind (2002)
- No Closure (2000)
- Shades of Khaki (1998)
- Gentlemen Start Your Engines (1996)
- Boomerang Fish (1994)
- Jump the Wall (1992)

=== Holiday repertoire ===
- YuleTied (2023)
- I'll Be Home for Christmas (2012)
- Christmas Soup (2007)
- The Gentlemen's First Christmas (2001)
