= Queens' Guard =

Military group at the College William & Mary, US

- QG
- Founded: February 8, 1961; 65 years ago Williamsburg, Virginia
- Type: Professional
- Affiliation: Independent
- Status: Active
- Emphasis: Military
- Scope: Local
- Motto: Corona Veniet Delectis' "Victory Shall Come to the Worthy"
- Colors: Maroon
- Symbol: Phoenix
- Chapters: 1
- Poem: "Invictus"
- Headquarters: 415 Richmond Road; Williamsburg, Virginia 23185; United States
- Website: Queens' Guard Website

The Queens' Guard (QG) is co-educational military fraternity that recruits primarily but not exclusively from the ROTC department at the College of William & Mary in Williamsburg, Virginia. It is the official honor guard and color guard for the college. The Queens' Guard also serves as the ceremonial guard for the British royal family during visits to the college.

== History ==
The Queens' Guard was founded in 1961 following Queen Elizabeth II's visit to the College of William and Mary in 1957 and is named for the patronage of three queens: Queen Mary II, Queen Anne, and Queen Elizabeth II. The William & Mary Reserve Officers' Training Corps (ROTC) saw steady enrollment through the 1950s. When Elizabeth II visited the college in 1957, an honor guard of ROTC students dressed in white pith helmets participated in the ceremonies and comprised the predecessor to the Queens' Guard By May 1960, more than 400 men were attending the military science classes, a higher enrollment than during the Korean War. During this wave of high morale within the ROTC program, college president Davis Young Paschall approved the establishment of the Queens' Guard on February 8, 1961, during his inauguration.

The Queens' Guard also served as the honor guard during Queen Elizabeth II's second visit to the college on May 4, 2007, marking the 400th anniversary of the founding of Jamestown. During William & Mary night at Nationals Park the Queens' Guard presents the colors.

Following a hazing citation in fall 2019 by the college's Community Values & Restorative Practices organization, the Queens' Guard was suspended until at least spring 2022. As of fall 2022 the organization has been welcomed back by the college.

The Queens' Guard held a memorial for the death of Queen Elizabeth II outside the Wren Building on September 8, 2022.

While originally associated with the Pershing Rifles and given the special unit designator Company W-4, the Queens' Guard has since officially separated into an independent organization.

== Symbols and motto ==
The crest of the fraternity is a phoenix rising from the ashes. This crest alludes to the rebuilding of the Wren Building which has been burnt down and rebuilt a total of three times. The rest of the crest includes the Latin motto and a crown bearing the cross of Saint George. The motto is Corona Veniet Delectis or "Victory shall come to the worthy". The motto literally translates as "The crown will come to the chosen". Its poem is "Invictus".

== Activities ==
The fraternity serves as the official color guard and honor guard for the college and represents them at official functions including football games, the Christmas Parade, the Sunset Ceremony, the Homecoming parade, and receives members of the British royal family should they return to visit the College of William and Mary. The Queens' Guard holds an annual memorial for the victims of the September 11 attacks and for the victims of the Virginia Tech Shooting. The honor guard is modeled after the honor guard of the Tomb of the Unknowns.

== Membership ==
After being accepted as a member of the Queens' Guard, candidates are trained and assessed in a six weeklong program. Biweekly training and assessment meetings typically last three hours and consist of one hour of administrative tasks and two hours of exhibition drill. Candidates are expected to become experts at the tenets of basic rifle drill before being accepted into the Queens' Guard as full members. While it is a Military Fraternity all students currently enrolled at the college are eligible for membership.
