= College of William & Mary =

University in Williamsburg, Virginia, US

The College of William & Mary in Virginia
- Latin: Collegium Gulielmi et Mariae
- Type: Royal college (1693–1776); Private college (1776–1906); Public research university (1906–present)
- Established: February 8, 1693; 333 years ago (Note: The college gives its founding date as 1693 (the date the college was chartered), but it has not operated continuously since that time, having closed at two separate periods, 1861–1869 (during and following the Civil War) and later during 1882–1888; see Post-colonial history.)
- Accreditation: SACS
- Religious affiliation: Nonsectarian, formerly Church of England and Episcopal Church
- Academic affiliations: ORAU; SCHEV; URA; Sea-grant; Space-grant
- Endowment: $1.9 billion (2026)
- Chancellor: Robert Gates
- President: Katherine Rowe
- Rector: Charles Poston
- Academic staff: 738 full-time, 183 part-time (2020)
- Students: 9,818 (fall 2024)
- Undergraduates: 7,063 (fall 2024)
- Postgraduates: 2,755 (fall 2024)
- Location: Williamsburg, Virginia, United States; 37°16′15″N 76°42′30″W
- Campus: 1,200 acres (490 ha); Small suburb
- Other campuses: Gloucester Point; Newport News; Washington, D.C.
- Newspaper: The Flat Hat
- Colors: Green and gold
- Nickname: Tribe
- Sporting affiliations: NCAA Division I FCS – CAA; Patriot League Football
- Mascot: The Griffin
- Website: www.wm.edu

The College of William & Mary (Note: The full formal name of the college is "The College of William and Mary in Virginia". Because it is a university, "William & Mary" is the preferred name in the university's branding.) (W&M) is a public research university in Williamsburg, Virginia, United States. Founded in 1693 under a royal charter issued by King William III and Queen Mary II, it is the second-oldest institution of higher learning in the United States, among the original nine colonial colleges, and the ninth-oldest institution in the English-speaking world. William & Mary is classified among "R1: Doctoral Universities – Very high research activity".

In 1779, then led by James Madison, Thomas Jefferson and other reformers, it underwent a significant transformation that saw the abolition of the Divinity School, the establishment of the first university-affiliated American law school, and a modernization of the curriculum. It was one of the first American institutions to offer graduate instruction. William & Mary was also the first to adopt an honor code (1736). In 1750, its students founded the first collegiate secret and honor society, the F.H.C. Society, popularly known as the Flat Hat Club, followed by the Phi Beta Kappa in 1776, the first Greek letter fraternity.

The university comprises six schools, and the main campus spans 1,200 acres and includes restored colonial structures, research centers, and modern academic facilities. Its historic Wren Building, attributed to Sir Christopher Wren, is the oldest academic building still standing in the United States. William & Mary is the only U.S. university with an official Coat of Arms granted by the College of Arms in London.

Alumni include three U.S. presidents (Thomas Jefferson, James Monroe, John Tyler), numerous Founding Fathers, U.S. Supreme Court Chief justice John Marshall, Speaker of the House Henry Clay, and early national leaders such as Edmund Randolph and Peyton Randolph. George Washington received his surveyor's license from the college in 1749 and later served as its first American chancellor.

== History ==
=== Colonial era (1693–1776) ===
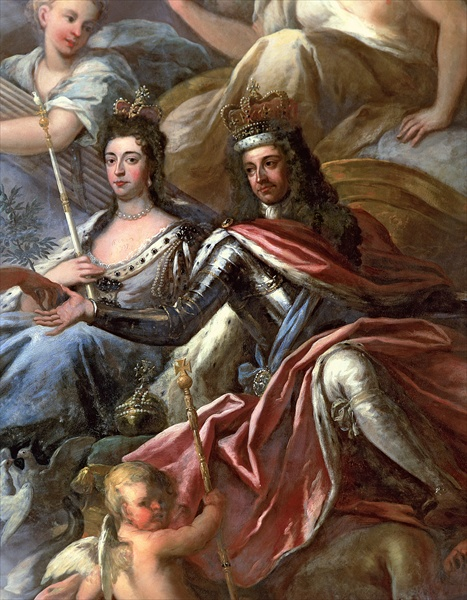
King William III and Queen Mary II, the college's namesakes

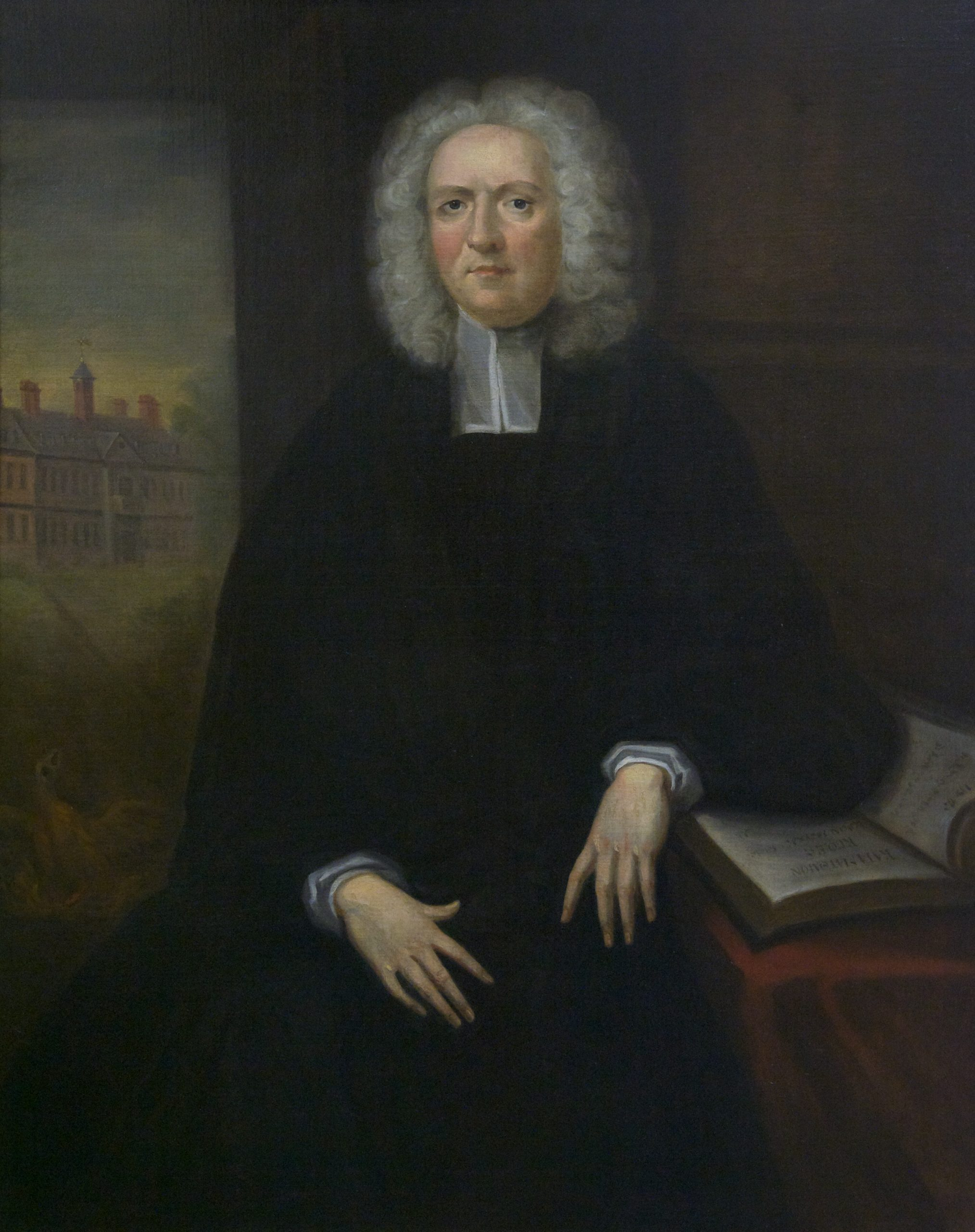
James Blair, founder of William & Mary

A school of higher education for both Native American young men and the sons of the colonists was one of the earliest goals of the leaders of the Colony of Virginia. The college's royal charter was granted on February 8, 1693 to "make, found and establish a certain Place of Universal Study, a perpetual College of Divinity, Philosophy, Languages, and other good arts and sciences ... to be supported and maintained, in all time coming." Named in honor of the reigning monarchs King William III and Queen Mary II, the college is the second-oldest in the United States after Harvard University (1636). The original plans for the college date back to 1618 at Henrico but were thwarted by the Indian massacre of 1622, a change in government (in 1624, the Virginia Company's charter was revoked by King James I and the Virginia Colony was transferred to royal authority as a crown colony), events related to the English Civil War, and Bacon's Rebellion. In 1695, before the town of Williamsburg existed, construction began on the College Building, now known as the Sir Christopher Wren Building, in what was then called Middle Plantation. It is the oldest college building in America. The college is one of the country's nine Colonial Colleges founded before the American Revolution. The charter named James Blair as the college's first president (a lifetime appointment which he held until he died in 1743). William & Mary was founded as an Anglican institution; students were required to be members of the Church of England, and professors were required to declare adherence to the Thirty-Nine Articles.

In 1693, the college was given a seat in the House of Burgesses, and it was determined tobacco taxes and export duties on furs and animal skins would support the college. The college acquired a 330 acres (1.3 km^{2}) parcel for the new school, 8 miles (13 km) from Jamestown. In 1694, the new school opened in temporary buildings. Williamsburg was granted a royal charter as a city in 1722 by the Crown and served as the capital of Colonial Virginia from 1699 to 1780. During this time, the college served as a law center, and lawmakers frequently used its buildings. It educated future U.S. Presidents Thomas Jefferson, James Monroe, and John Tyler. The college had close ties to America's founding fathers and figures pivotal to the development and expansion of the United States. George Washington, who received his surveyor's license through the college despite never attending, was the college's first American chancellor. William & Mary is famous for its firsts: the first U.S. institution with a royal charter, the first Greek-letter society (Phi Beta Kappa, founded in 1776), the first collegiate society in the country (F.H.C. Society, founded in 1750), the first student honor code and the first collegiate law school in America. (Note: The independent Litchfield Law School in Litchfield, Connecticut, began offering formal legal education five years before William & Mary.) In the 1760s, due to a conflict between the faculty (almost entirely Anglian ministers) and the Board of Visitors (mainly leading local families whose students attended), discipline was weak. The college had a reputation as a "party school"; groups of students would also occasionally rampage through the city, damaging property and getting into fights with artisans.

=== American Revolution ===
During the American Revolution, the Colony of Virginia established a freedom of religion, notably with the 1786 passage of the Virginia Statute for Religious Freedom. Future U.S. President James Madison was a key figure in the transition to religious freedom in Virginia, and James Madison, his cousin and Thomas Jefferson, who was on the Board of Visitors, helped the College of William & Mary make the transition. In 1779, the college established graduate schools in law and medicine, making it one of the institutions that claimed to be the first university in the United States. As its president, Madison worked with the new leaders of Virginia, most notably Jefferson, on a reorganization and changes for the college which included the abolition of the Divinity School and the Indian School and the establishment of the first elective system of study and honor system.

The College of William & Mary is home to the nation's first collegiate secret society, the F.H.C. Society, popularly known as the Flat Hat Club, founded on November 11, 1750. On December 5, 1776, students John Heath and William Short (class of 1779) founded Phi Beta Kappa as a secret literary and philosophical society. Other secret societies known to exist at the college currently include: The 7 Society, 13 Club, Alpha Club, Bishop James Madison Society, The Society, The Spades, W Society, and Wren Society. Thomas R. Dew, professor of history, metaphysics, and political economy, and then president of William & Mary from 1836 until he died in 1846, was an influential academic defender of slavery. In 1842, alumni of the college formed the Society of the Alumni which is now the sixth oldest alum organization in the United States.

=== American Civil War ===
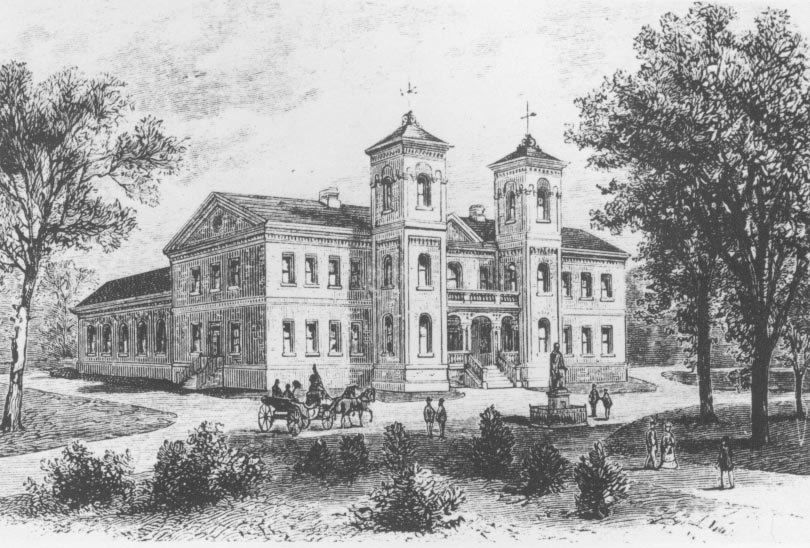
The College Building as it appeared from 1859–1862 with Italianate towers

At the outset of the American Civil War (1861–1865), enlistments in the Confederate States Army depleted the student body. On May 10, 1861, the faculty voted to close the college for the duration of the conflict. General Charles A. Whittier reported that "thirty-two out of thirty-five professors and instructors abandoned the college work and joined the army in the field". The College Building was used as a Confederate barracks and later as a hospital, first by Confederate, and later Union forces. The Battle of Williamsburg was fought nearby during the Peninsula Campaign on May 5, 1862. The following day, on May 6, 1862, Williamsburg was captured by the Union army. The Brafferton building of the college was used for a time as quarters for the commanding officer of the Union garrison occupying the town. On September 9, 1862, drunken soldiers of the 5th Pennsylvania Cavalry set fire to the College Building, purportedly in an attempt to prevent Confederate snipers from using it for cover.

=== Late 19th century ===
Following the restoration of the Union, Virginia was destitute. The college's 16th president, Benjamin Stoddert Ewell, finally reopened the school in 1869 using his funds, but the college closed again in 1882 due to insufficient funding. In 1888, William & Mary resumed operations under an amended charter when the Commonwealth of Virginia passed an act appropriating $10,000 to support the college as a teacher-training institution. Lyon Gardiner Tyler, son of US President and alumnus John Tyler, became the 17th president of the college following Ewell's retirement. Tyler and his successor J. A. C. Chandler expanded the college. In 1896, Minnie Braithwaite Jenkins was the first woman to attempt to take classes at William & Mary, although her petition was denied.

=== 20th century ===
In March 1906, the Virginia General Assembly passed an act taking over the college grounds, and the college has remained publicly supported ever since. In 1918, it was one of the first universities in Virginia to admit women. Enrollment increased from 104 in 1889 to 1269 students by 1932. W. A. R. Goodwin, rector at Bruton Parish Church and professor of biblical literature and religious education at the college, pursued benefactors who could support the restoration of Williamsburg. Goodwin considered Williamsburg "as the original training and testing ground" of the United States. Goodwin persuaded John D. Rockefeller Jr. to initiate the restoration of Williamsburg in 1926, leading to the establishment of Colonial Williamsburg. Goodwin had initially only pursued Rockefeller to help fund the construction of Phi Beta Kappa Memorial Hall, but had convinced Rockefeller to participate in a broader restoration effort when he visited William & Mary for the hall's dedication. While the college's administration was less supportive of the restoration efforts than many others in Williamsburg–before the Colonial Williamsburg project, the William & Mary campus was Williamsburg's primary tourist attraction–the college's cooperation was secured. Restoration paid for by Rockefeller's program extended to the college, with the Wren Building restored in 1928–1931, President's House in 1931, and Brafferton in 1931–1932.

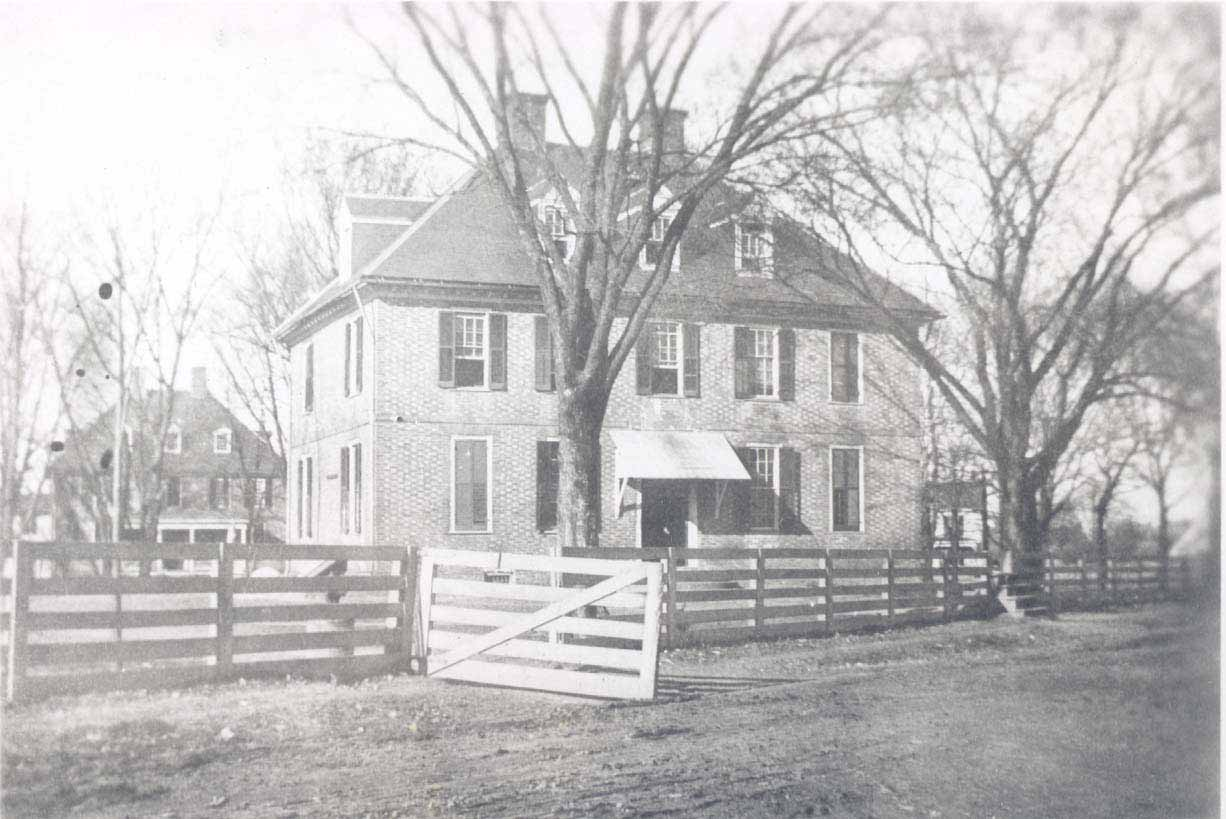
The Brafferton, c. 1907

In 1930, William & Mary established a branch in Norfolk, Virginia called The Norfolk Division of the College of William & Mary; it eventually became the independent state-supported institution known as Old Dominion University. President Franklin D. Roosevelt received an honorary degree from the college on October 20, 1934. In 1935, the Sunken Garden was constructed just west of the Wren Building. The sunken design is from a similar landscape feature at Royal Hospital Chelsea in London, designed by Sir Christopher Wren. In 1945, the editor-in-chief of The Flat Hat, Marilyn Kaemmerle, wrote an editorial, "Lincoln's Job Half-Done..." that supported the end of racial segregation, anti-miscegenation laws and white supremacy; the university administration removed her from the newspaper and nearly expelled her. According to Time magazine, in response, over one-thousand William & Mary students held "a spirited mass meeting protesting infringement of the sacred principles of freedom of the press bequeathed by Alumnus Thomas Jefferson." She was allowed to graduate, but future editors had to discuss "controversial writings" with faculty before printing. The college Board of Visitors apologized to her in the 1980s. The college admitted Hulon Willis into a graduate program in 1951 because the program was unavailable at Virginia State. However, the college did not open all programs to African-American students until around 1970.

In 1960, The Colleges of William & Mary, a short-lived five-campus university system, was founded. It included the College of William & Mary, the Richmond Professional Institute, the Norfolk Division of the College of William & Mary, Christopher Newport College, and Richard Bland College. It was dissolved in 1962, with only Richard Bland College remaining officially associated with the College of William & Mary at the present day. Throughout the second half of the 20th century, William & Mary has retained its historic ties to the United Kingdom and that state's royal family. In 1954, Queen Elizabeth The Queen Mother visited William & Mary as part of her tour of the United States, becoming the first member of the royal family to visit the college. In 1957, Queen Elizabeth II and Prince Philip, Duke of Edinburgh, visited the college to commemorate the 350th anniversary of the landing at Jamestown. Queen Elizabeth gave a speech from the balcony of the Wren Building that drew over 20,000 people, the largest crowd ever seen in the city. In 1974, Jay Winston Johns willed Highland, the 535-acre (2.17 km^{2}) historic Albemarle County, Virginia estate of alumnus and U.S. President James Monroe, to the college. The institution restored the historic presidential home near Charlottesville and opened it publicly. In 1981, Charles, Prince of Wales, visited to commemorate the 200th anniversary of the Battle of Yorktown.

In 1988, the United States Congress selected William & Mary to send a delegation to the United Kingdom for the 300th anniversary of the ascension of King William III and Queen Mary II. Prince Charles would return to the college in 1993 for the 300th anniversary of William & Mary. William & Mary sent a delegation to meet with Queen Elizabeth II that same year. Former Prime Minister Margaret Thatcher would be made the Chancellor of the College of William & Mary that same year. In 2007, Elizabeth II and Prince Philip would visit the college for a second time to recognize the 400th anniversary of the landing at Jamestown. In 2022, a beacon was lit in front of the Wren Building to celebrate the Platinum Jubilee of Queen Elizabeth II.

=== 21st century ===
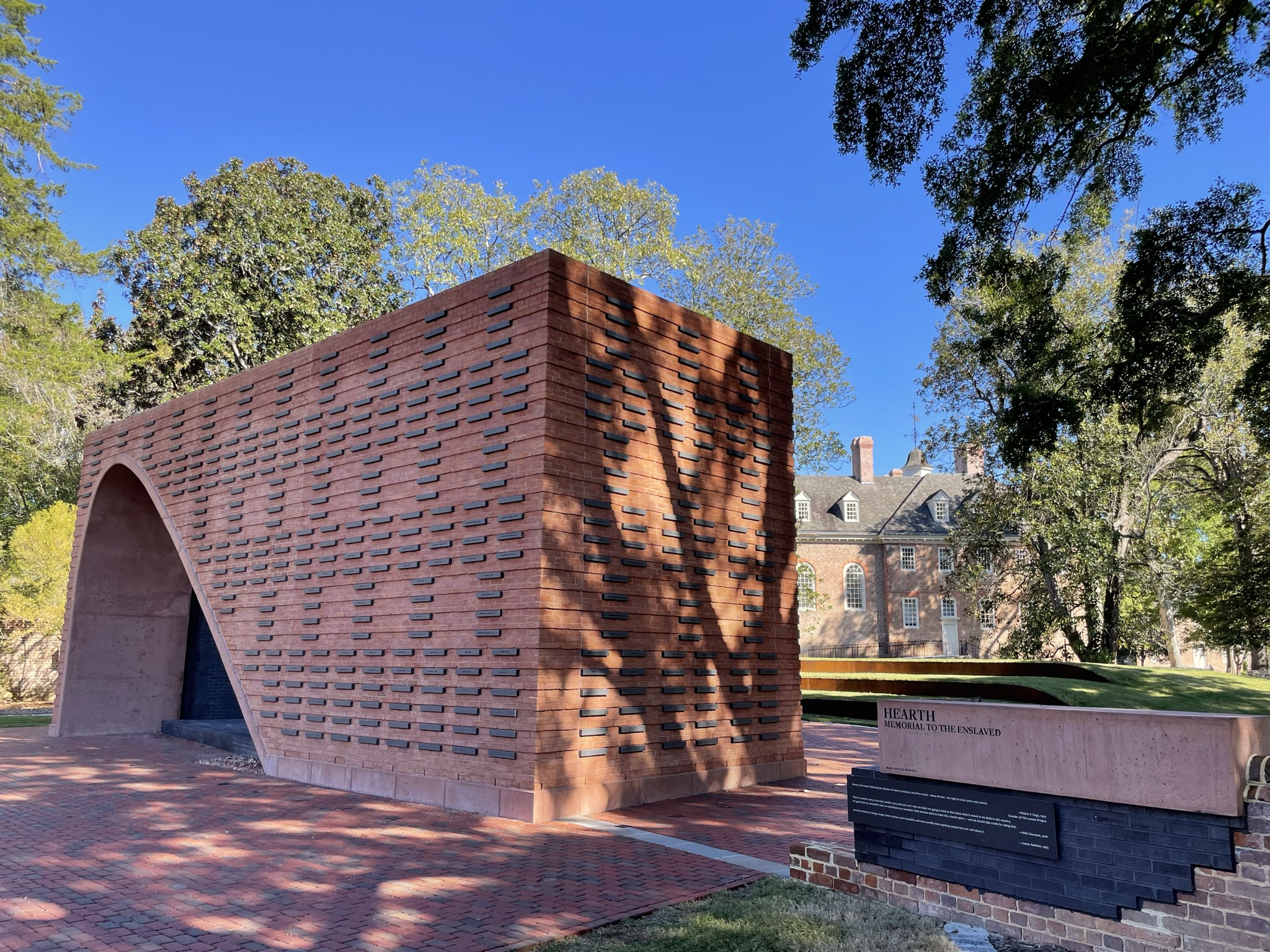
Hearth: Memorial to the Enslaved, dedicated in 2022 to commemorate enslaved persons owned and used by the college

On July 25, 2012, Eastern Virginia Medical School (EVMS), in nearby Norfolk, Virginia, made a joint announcement with William & Mary that the two schools were considering merging, with the prospect that EVMS would become the William & Mary School of Medicine. Eventually, in 2024, Old Dominion University, rather than William & Mary integrated Eastern Virginia Medical School to create Macon & Joan Brock Virginia Health Sciences at Old Dominion University, becoming the largest academic health sciences center in the commonwealth.

== Campus ==
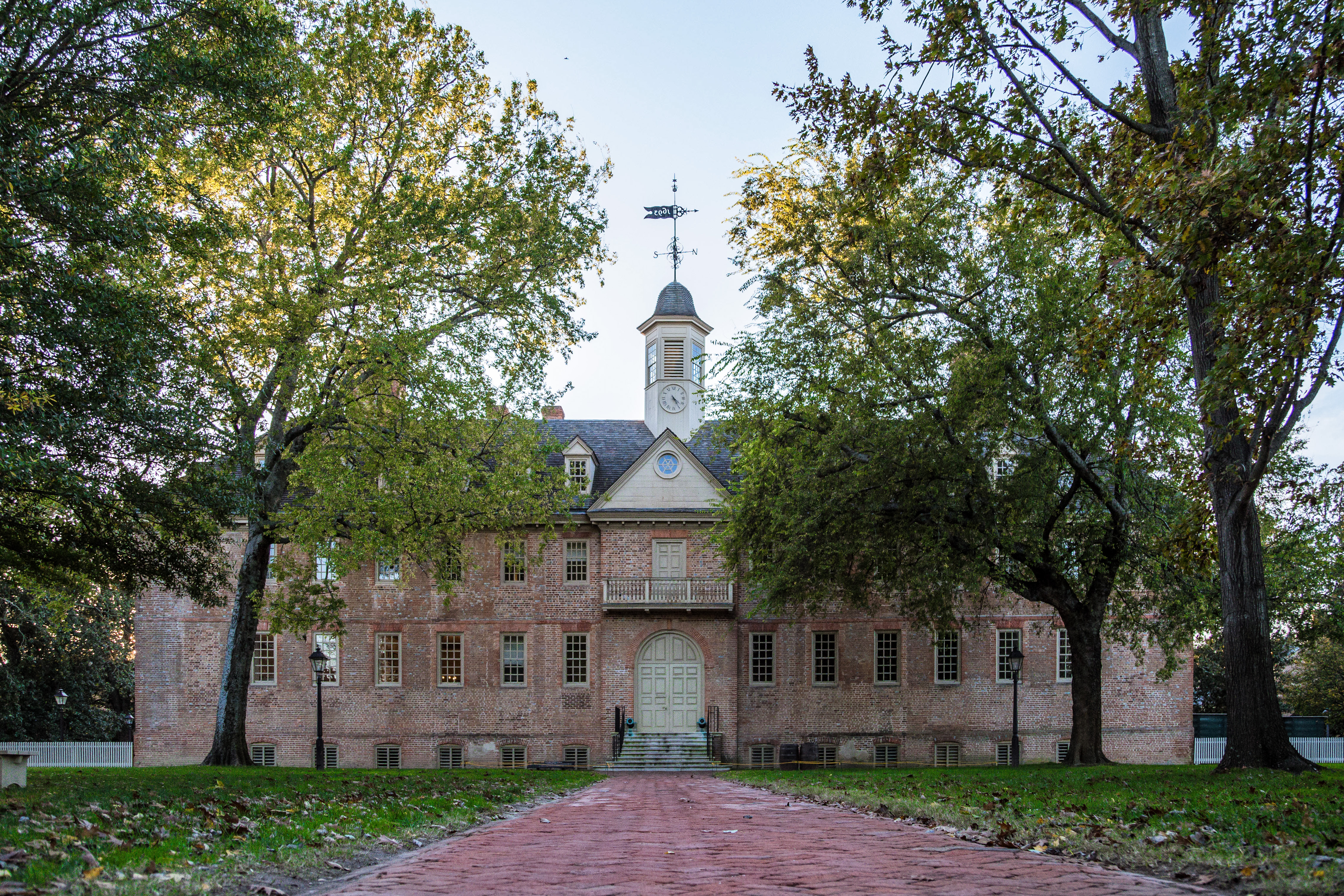
The Sir Christopher Wren Building is the oldest college building in the United States.

The college sits on a 1,200-acre (490 ha) campus in Williamsburg, Virginia, bordering the historic colonial town. The vast majority of William & Mary's 1,200 acres (4.9 km^{2}) consists of woodlands and Lake Matoaka, an artificial lake created by colonists in the early 18th century. The Sir Christopher Wren Building is the oldest college building in the United States and was designated as a National Historic Landmark. The building, colloquially referred to as the "Wren Building", was named upon its renovation in 1931 to honor the English architect Sir Christopher Wren. (Note: The basis for the 1930s name is a 1724 history in which mathematics professor Hugh Jones stated the 1699 design was "first modelled by Sir Christopher Wren" and then was adapted "by the Gentlemen there" in Virginia; little is known about how it looked since it burned within a few years of its completion.) Today's Wren Building is based on the design of its 1716 replacement. The college's alum association has suggested Wren's connection to the 1931 building is a viable subject of investigation.

Two other buildings around the Wren Building compose an area known as "Ancient" or "Historic Campus": the Brafferton (built within 1723 and originally housing the Indian School, now the President and Provost's offices) and the President's House, (built within 1732). In addition to the Ancient Campus, which dates to the 18th century, the college also consists of "Old Campus" and "New Campus". "Old Campus", adjacent to Ancient Campus, surrounds the Sunken Garden.

Adjoining "Old Campus" to the north and west is "New Campus", which was constructed primarily between 1950 and 1980, and it consists of academic buildings and dormitories that, while of the same brick construction as "Old Campus", fit into the vernacular of modern architecture. Beginning with the college's tercentenary in 1993, the college has embarked on a building and renovation program favoring traditional architectural style of "Old Campus", while incorporating energy-efficient technologies including LEED certification. Additionally, as the buildings of "New Campus" are renovated after decades of use, several have been remodeled to incorporate more traditional architectural elements to unify the appearance of the entire college campus. "New Campus" is dominated by William and Mary Hall, Earl Gregg Swem Library, and formerly Phi Beta Kappa Memorial Hall. It also includes the offices and classrooms of the Mathematics, Physics, Psychology, Biology, and Chemistry Departments, the majority of freshman dormitories, the fraternity complex, the majority of the college's athletic fields, and the Muscarelle Museum of Art.

The recent wave of construction at William & Mary has resulted in a new building for the School of Education, not far from Kaplan Hall, formerly William and Mary Hall. The offices and classrooms of the Government, Economics, and Classical Language Departments share John E. Boswell Hall (formerly "Morton Hall") on "New Campus". These departments have been piecemeal separated and relocated to buildings recently renovated within the "Old Campus", such as Chancellors' Hall. The newest addition to "New Campus" is Alan B. Miller Hall, the headquarters of the college's Mason School of Business.

Following the George Floyd protests and associated movements, as well as student and faculty pressure in 2020 and 2021, several buildings, halls, and other entities were renamed. Maury Hall (named for Confederate sailor Matthew Fontaine Maury) on the Virginia Institute of Marine Science campus and Trinkle Hall (named for Governor Elbert Lee Trinkle) of Campus Center were renamed in September 2020 to York River Hall and Unity Hall respectively. In April 2021, three buildings were renamed at following a vote by the Board of Visitors: Morton Hall (named for professor Richard Lee Morton) to John E. Boswell Hall (for LGBT advocate and alum John Boswell), Taliaferro Hall (named for Confederate General William Taliaferro) to Hulon L. Willis Sr. Hall (Hulon Willis Sr. was the first Black student at the college), and Tyler Hall (named for President John Tyler and his son) to its original name of Chancellors' Hall (the hall had been renamed in 1988).

== Organization and administration ==
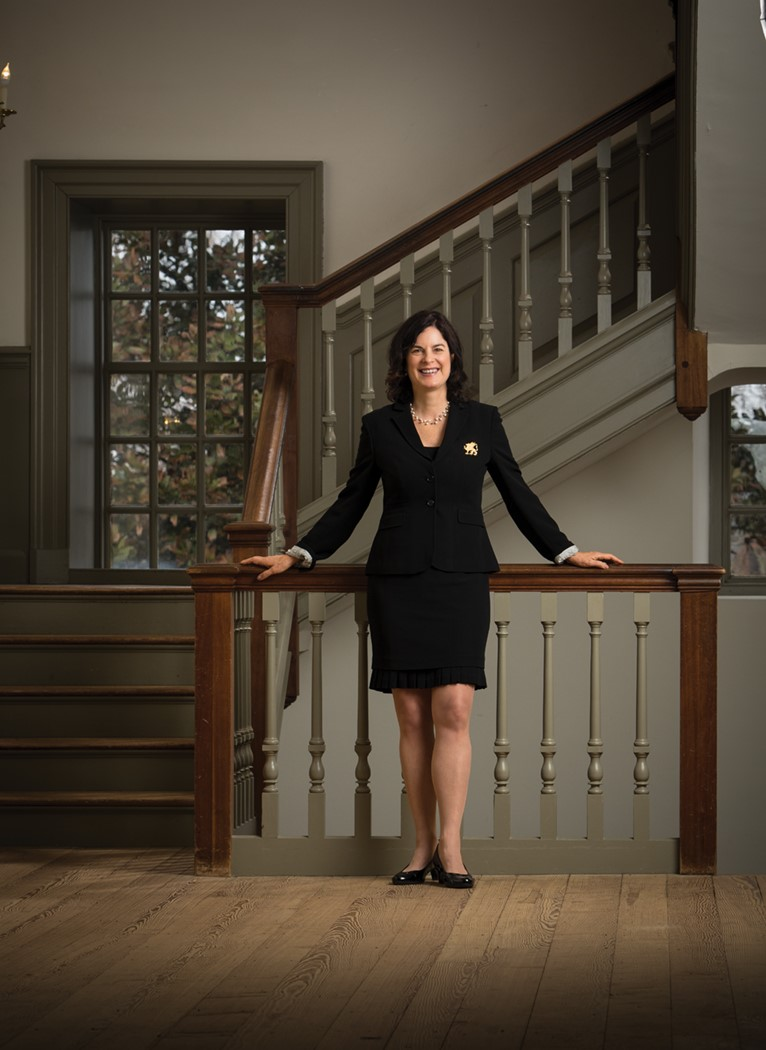
Katherine Rowe was named the twenty-eighth president of William & Mary in 2018.

The Chancellor of the College of William & Mary is largely ceremonial. Until 1776, the position was held by an English subject, usually the Archbishop of Canterbury or the Bishop of London, who served as the college's advocate to the Crown, while a colonial President oversaw the day-to-day activities of the Williamsburg campus. Following the Revolutionary War, General George Washington was appointed as the first American chancellor; later, United States President John Tyler held the post. The college has recently had several distinguished chancellors: former Chief Justice of the United States Warren E. Burger (1986–1993), former British Prime Minister Margaret Thatcher (1993–2000), former U.S. Secretary of State Henry Kissinger (2000–2005), and former U.S. Supreme Court Justice Sandra Day O'Connor (2005–2012). Former U.S. Secretary of Defense Robert M. Gates, himself an alumnus of the college, succeeded O'Connor in February 2012.

The Board of Visitors is a corporation established by the General Assembly of Virginia to govern and supervise the operation of the College of William & Mary and of Richard Bland College. The corporation is composed of 17 members appointed by the Governor of Virginia, based upon the recommendations made by the Society of the Alumni, to a maximum of two successive four-year terms. The Board elects a Rector, Vice-Rector, and Secretary, and the Board meets four times annually. The Board appoints a president, related administrative officers, and an honorary chancellor, approving degrees, admission policies, departments, and schools and executing the fiduciary duties of supervising the college's property and finances. The Board of Visitors delegates to a president the operating responsibility and accountability for the college's administrative, fiscal, and academic performance, as well as representing the college on public occasions such as conferral of degrees. W. Taylor Reveley III, 27th President of the college, served from 2008 to 2018. In February 2018, The Board of Visitors unanimously elected Katherine A. Rowe as Reveley's successor. Rowe is the first female president to serve the college since its founding.

Faculty members are organized into separate faculties of the Faculty of Arts and Science as well as those for the respective schools of Business, Education, Law, and Virginia Institute of Marine Science. Each faculty is presided over by a dean, who reports to the provost, and governs itself through separate by-laws approved by the Board of Visitors. The faculty is also represented by a faculty assembly advising the president and provost. The Royal Hospital School, an independent boarding school in the United Kingdom, is a sister institution.

== Academics ==
As a medium-sized, highly residential, public research university, the focal point of the institution is its four-year, full-time undergraduate program which constitutes most of the institution's enrollment. The college has a strong undergraduate arts and sciences focus, with many graduate programs in diverse fields ranging from American colonial history to marine science. The university offers multiple academic programs through its center in Washington, D.C, an undergraduate joint degree program in engineering with Columbia University, as well as a liberal arts joint degree program with the University of St Andrews in Scotland.

The graduate programs are dominant in STEM fields and the university has a high level of research activity. For the 2016–17 academic year, 1,591 undergraduate, 652 masters, and 293 doctoral degrees were conferred. William & Mary is accredited by the Southern Association of Colleges and Schools.

William & Mary contains several schools, academic departments, and interdisciplinary research institutes, including:

- College of Arts and Sciences
- Batten School of Coastal & Marine Sciences at VIMS
- Raymond A. Mason School of Business
- William & Mary Law School
- William & Mary School of Computing, Data Sciences & Physics
- William & Mary School of Education

William & Mary offers exchange programs with 15 foreign schools, drawing more than 12% of its undergraduates into these programs. It also receives U.S. State Department grants to expand its foreign exchange programs further.

=== Admissions and tuition ===
Admissions statistics
- 2023 entering class
- Admit rate: 32.7% (▼ −4.2)
- Yield rate: 28.2% ( −0.4)

Test scores middle 50%^{[i]}
- SAT Total: 1365–1510 (among 45% of FTFs)
- ACT Composite: 32–34 (among 17% of FTFs)

High school GPA
- Average: 4.4

William & Mary enrolled 7,063 undergraduate and 2,755 postgraduate students in Fall 2024. In 2018, women made up 57.6% of the undergraduate and 50.7% of the graduate student bodies.

Admission to W&M is considered "most selective" according to U.S. News & World Report. For the undergraduate class entering fall 2024, William & Mary received 17,789 applications and accepted 6,063, or 34.0%. Of accepted applications, 1,614 enrolled, a yield rate of 26.6%. Of all matriculating students, the average high school GPA is 4.4. The interquartile range for total SAT scores was 1400–1530, while the range for ACT scores was 32–34.

Undergraduate tuition for 2024–2025 was $18,709 for Virginia residents and $43,442 for out-of-state students. W&M granted over $20.9 million in need-based scholarships in 2014–2015 to 1,734 undergraduates (27.5% of the undergraduate student body); 37% of the student body received loans, and average student indebtedness was $26,017. Research of William & Mary's student body published in 2016 and 2017 showed students hailed overwhelmingly from wealthy family backgrounds, even as compared to other elite public institutions. The college is need-blind for domestic applicants.

=== Rankings ===
Academic rankings

National
- Forbes: 55
- U.S. News & World Report: 51 (tie)
- Washington Monthly: 109
- WSJ/College Pulse: 79

Global
- QS: 901–950
- THE: 601–800
- U.S. News & World Report: 1049 (tie)

USNWR Undergraduate Rankings
Program	Ranking
Biological Sciences	159
Computer Science	68
History	27
U.S. Colonial History	1
Physics	71
Public Affairs	94
Undergraduate Teaching	4 (tied)

USNWR Graduate Rankings
Program	Ranking
Biological Sciences	158
Business	45
Computer Science	70
Earth Sciences	83
Education	70
History	26
Law	45
Physics	78
Public Affairs	108

In the 2026 U.S. News & World Report rankings, W&M ranks as tied for the 21st-best public university in the United States, tied for 51st-best among "national universities" in the U.S., and tied for 1207th-best university in the world. U.S. News & World Report also rated William & Mary's undergraduate teaching as tied for 12th best among 70 "national universities". In 2025, Forbes ranked William & Mary #43 among research universities. In 2025, College Raptor ranked William & Mary's median SAT score #2 of public colleges and universities in the United States. William & Mary is ranked 3rd for four year graduation rates among public colleges and universities.

William & Mary is one of the original eight "Public Ivies." In 2025, Forbes recognized W&M as one of the ten public universities featured on its "New Ivies" list. In 2019, Kiplinger ranked William & Mary 6th out of 174 best-value public colleges and universities in the U.S. According to the National Science Foundation, in 2022 William & Mary was ranked first among public institutions for percentage of alumni who earn doctoral degrees in humanities fields.

In the 2024–25 "America's Top Colleges" ranking by Forbes, W&M was ranked the 17th best public college and 55th out of the 500 best private and public colleges and universities in the U.S. W&M ranked 3rd for race and class interaction in The Princeton Review's 2018 rankings. The college was ranked as the public college with the smartest students in the nation according to Business Insider's 2014 survey. In 2020, W&M was ranked 4th for "Colleges with the Happiest Students" by The Princeton Review and 9th in a list of the public universities that "pay off the most", according to CNBC. In 2022, the Center on Education and the Workforce at Georgetown University ranked William & Mary's undergraduate business program #21 in value nationally. In 2025, Poets & Quants ranked William & Mary's undergraduate business program #20 nationally.

=== Publications ===
The Omohundro Institute of Early American History and Culture publishes William and Mary Quarterly, a scholarly journal focusing on colonial history, particularly in North America in the Age of Discovery and after it. W&M also hosts several student journals: The Monitor, the undergraduate journal of International Studies, is published semi-annually. The Lyon Gardiner Tyler Department of History publishes an annual undergraduate history journal, the James Blair Historical Review.

Non-academic publications include The William & Mary Review, William & Mary's official literary magazine, Winged Nation, a student literary arts magazine, Acropolis, the art and art history magazine, The Flat Hat, the student newspaper, The Botetourt Squat, the student satirical newspaper, The Colonial Echo, William & Mary's yearbook, The DoG Street Journal, a daily online newspaper, and Rocket Magazine, William & Mary's fashion, art, and photography publication.

== Student life ==
Student body composition as of Fall 2023
Race and ethnicity	Total
White	61%
Asian	12%
Hispanic	9%
Two or more races	7%
Black	6%
International student	4%
Unknown	2%
Economic diversity
Low-income (Note: The percentage of students who received an income-based federal Pell grant intended for low-income students.)	12%
Affluent (Note: The percentage of students who are a part of the American middle class at the bare minimum.)	88%

The college hosts several prominent student-run culture and identity-based organizations. These include the Black Student Organization, Catholic Campus Ministry, Hillel (the college's official Jewish student group), Asian American Student Initiative, Latin American Student Union, Lambda Alliance and Rainbow Coalition, and the Middle Eastern Students Association. The college's International Relations Club (IRC) ranked eleventh of twenty-five participants in the 2020–2021 North American College Model U.N.

The official student newspaper is The Flat Hat; an arts and fashion magazine is called Rocket Magazine, and the satirical newspaper is The Botetourt Squat. The school's television station is WMTV. Everyday Gourmet, the former flagship production of the station, was featured in USA Today in 2009. WCWM is the college's student-run public radio station. William & Mary's radio station, WCWM, has been on the air since 1959.

=== Traditions ===
William & Mary has several traditions, including the Yule Log Ceremony, at which the president dresses as Santa Claus and reads a rendition of "How the Grinch Stole Christmas", the Vice-President of Student Affairs reads "Twas the Night Before Finals", and The Gentlemen of the College sing the song "The Twelve Days of Christmas". This popular tradition started with German immigrant Charles Minnigerode, a humanities professor at the college in 1842 who taught Latin and Greek.

W&M also takes pride in its connections to its colonial past during Charter Day festivities. Charter Day is technically February 8, based on the date (from the Julian Calendar) that James Blair, first president of the college, received the charter from the Court of William III and Mary II at Kensington Palace in 1693. Past Charter Day speakers have included former US President John Tyler, Henry Kissinger, Margaret Thatcher, and Robert Gates.

Another underground tradition at W&M is known as the "Triathlon". As reported by The Flat Hat, the tradition – normally performed before graduation – involves completing three activities: jumping the walls of the Governor's Palace in Colonial Williamsburg, streaking through the Sunken Garden, and finally swimming in the Crim Dell. The tradition has been referred to as an underground one and is not sanctioned by the college but is still widely practiced.

=== Student Assembly ===
The Student Assembly is the student government organization serving undergraduates and graduates. It allocates a student organization budget and funds services, advocates for student rights, and is the formal student representation to the City of Williamsburg and William & Mary administration. It consists of Executive, Legislative, and Judicial branches. The president and vice president are elected jointly by the student body to lead the Executive Branch, and each class elects one class president and four senators who serve in the Senate (the Legislative Branch). The five graduate schools appoint one to two senators. The Cabinet consists of 10 departments managed by secretaries and undersecretaries.

=== Honor system ===
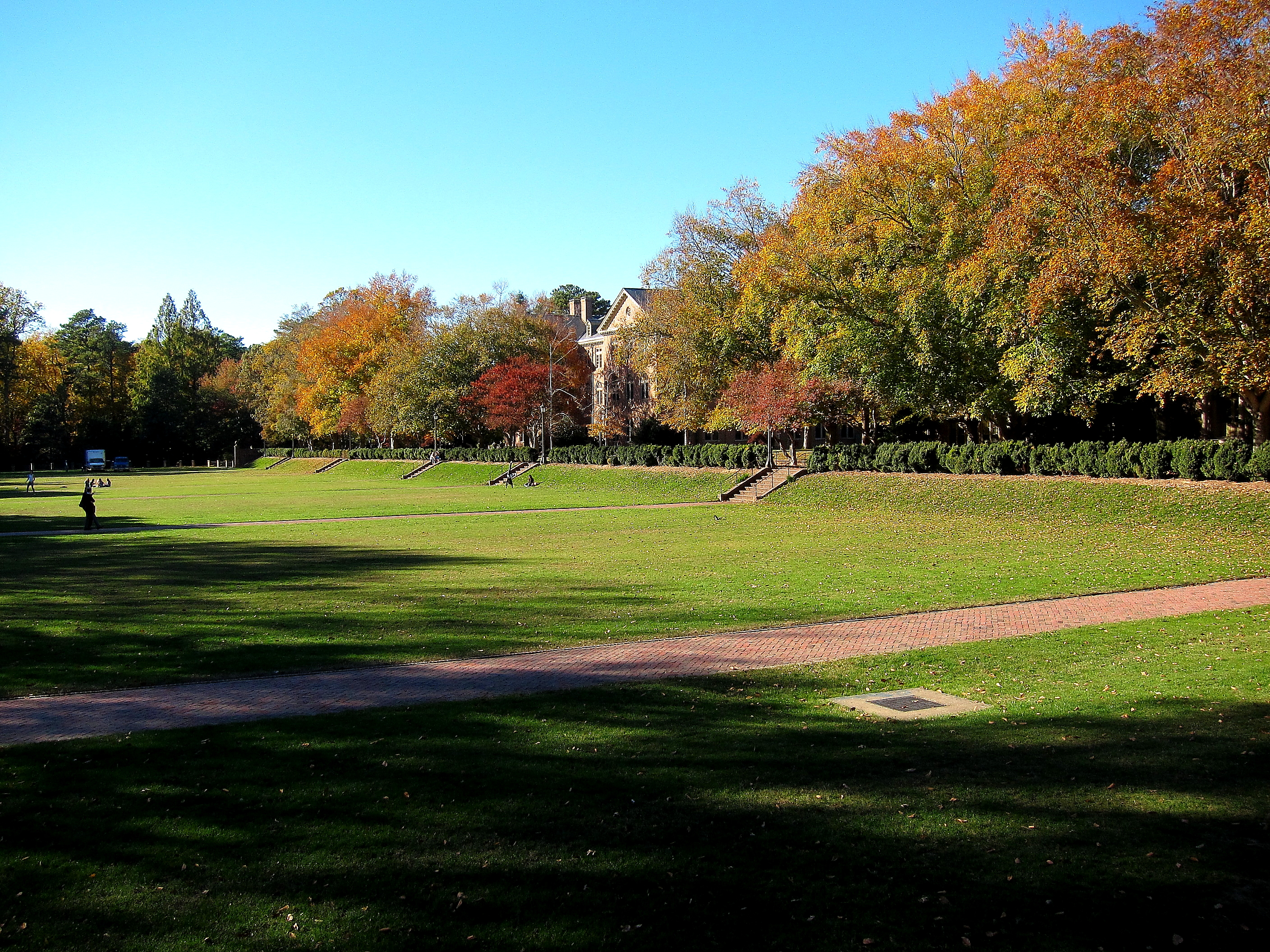
The Sunken Garden, a central element of the Old Campus

William & Mary's honor system was established by alumnus Thomas Jefferson in 1779 and is widely believed to be the nation's first. During the orientation week, every entering student recites the Honor Pledge in the Great Hall of the Wren Building pledging:

As a Member of the William & Mary community I pledge, on my Honor, not to lie, cheat, or steal in either my academic or personal life. I understand that such acts violate the Honor Code and undermine the community of trust of which we are all stewards.

The basis of W&M's Honor Pledge was written over 150 years ago by alum and law professor Henry St. George Tucker Sr. While teaching law at the University of Virginia, Tucker proposed students attach a pledge to all exams confirming on their honor they did not receive any assistance. Tucker's honor pledge was the early basis of the Honor System at the University of Virginia. At W&M, the Honor System stands as one of the college's most important traditions; it remains student-administered through the Honor Council with the advice of the faculty and administration of the college. The college's Honor System is codified such that students found guilty of cheating, stealing, or lying are subject to sanctions ranging from a verbal warning to expulsion.

W&M considers the observance of public laws of equal importance to the observance of its particular regulations. William & Mary's Board of Visitors delegates authority for discipline to its president. The President oversees a hierarchy of disciplinary authorities to enforce local laws as it pertains to William & Mary's interest as well as its internal regulatory system.

=== Fraternities and sororities ===
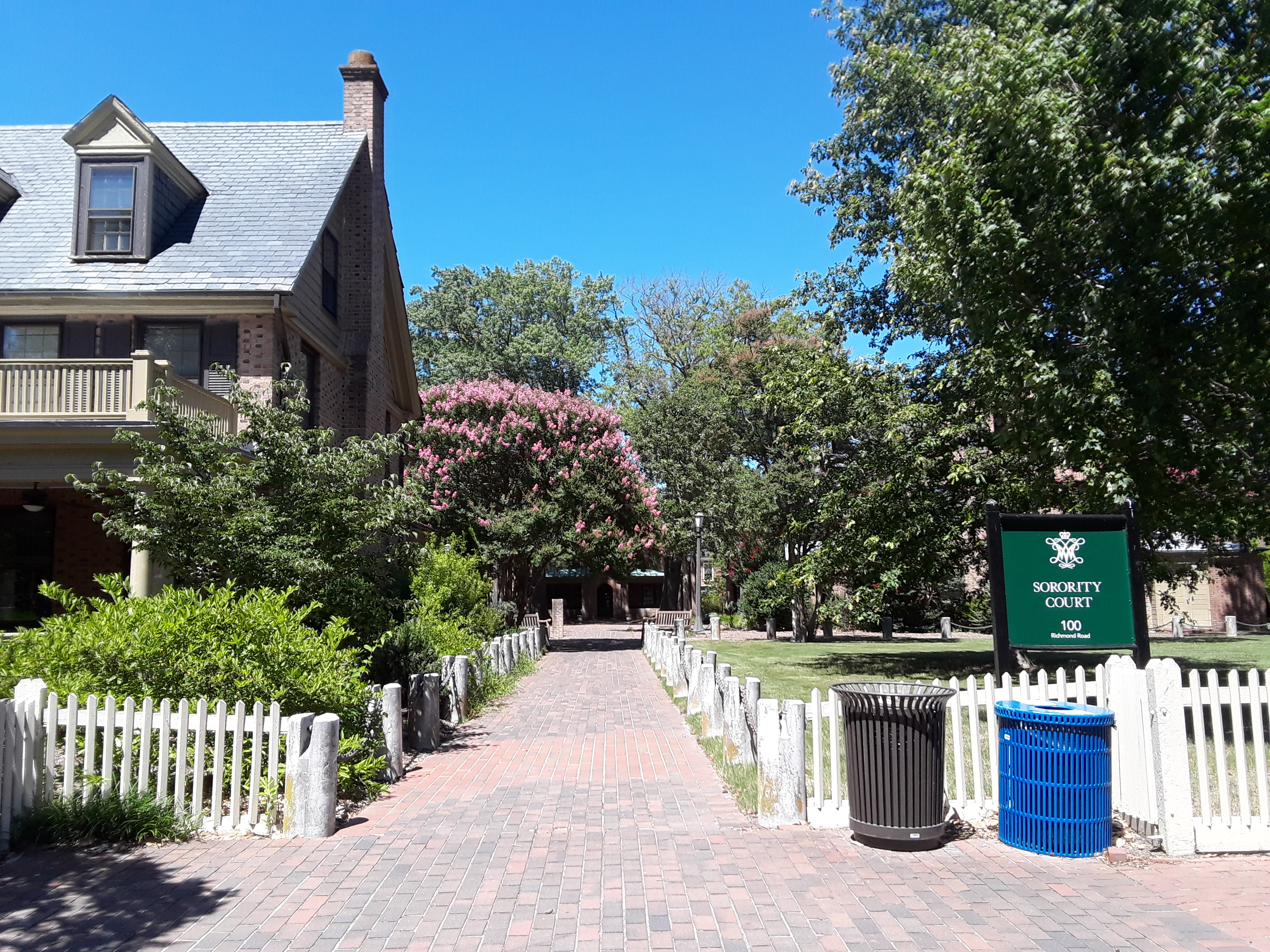
Sorority Court on Old Campus

William & Mary has a long history of fraternities and sororities dating back to 1750 and the founding of the F.H.C. Society, the first collegiate fraternity established in what now is the United States. Phi Beta Kappa, the first "Greek-letter" fraternity, was founded at the college in 1776. Various Greek organizations play an important role in the college community and other social organizations, such as theatre and club sports groups. In total, about one-third of undergraduate students are active members of one or another of 16 national fraternities and 13 sororities. William & Mary is also home to several unusual fraternal or similar organizations, including the Nu Kappa Epsilon music sorority and its male counterpart, Phi Mu Alpha Sinfonia; the Alpha Phi Omega co-ed service fraternity; gender-inclusive Phi Sigma Pi and other honor fraternities.

=== Secret societies ===
Several student secret societies exist at the college, including the Flat Hat Club, Seven Society, 13 Club, Bishop James Madison Society, and Wren Society.

=== Queens' Guard ===
The Queens' Guard was established on February 8, 1961, as a special unit of the Army Reserve Officers' Training Corps and was affiliated with the Pershing Rifles. The Guard was described by former President Davis Young Paschall as "a unit organized, outfitted with special uniforms, and trained in appropriate drills and ceremonies as will represent the College of William & Mary in Virginia on such occasions and in such events as may be approved by the President." The uniform of the Guard loosely resembles that of the Scots Guards of the United Kingdom. The baldric is a pleated Stuart tartan in honor of Queen Mary II and Queen Anne. Following a hazing citation in fall 2019 by the college's Community Values & Restorative Practices organization, the Queens' Guard was suspended until at least spring 2022.

=== Music ===
William & Mary has eleven collegiate a cappella groups: The Christopher Wren Singers (1987, co-ed); The Gentlemen of the College (1990, all-male); The Stairwells (1990, all-male); Intonations (1990, all-female); Reveille (1992, all-female); The Accidentals (1992, all-female); DoubleTake (1993, co-ed); The Cleftomaniacs (1999, co-ed); Passing Notes (2002, all-female); The Tribetones (2015, all-female); and the Crim Dell Criers (2019, co-ed). Sinfonicron Light Opera Company, founded in 1965, is William & Mary's student-run light opera company, producing musicals (traditionally those by Gilbert & Sullivan) in the early spring of each academic year. Music societies at the college include local chapters of the music honor societies Delta Omicron (co-ed) and Phi Mu Alpha (all-male) as well as Nu Kappa Epsilon (all-female). Nu Kappa Epsilon, founded in 1994 at William & Mary, is "dedicated to promoting the growth and development of musical activities at the college as well as in the Williamsburg community".

Large musical ensembles include a symphony orchestra, wind symphony, and four choral ensembles: The William & Mary Choir, The Botetourt Chamber Singers, The Barksdale Treble Chorus (formerly the William & Mary Women's Chorus), and Ebony Expressions Gospel Choir. The Botetourt Chamber Singers (1974, co-ed) are the student chamber choir. There are several musical ensembles at the college, from Early Music Ensemble to Jazz. Prior to 1996 the college had a marching band, which has since changed into the William & Mary Pep Band.

== Athletics ==
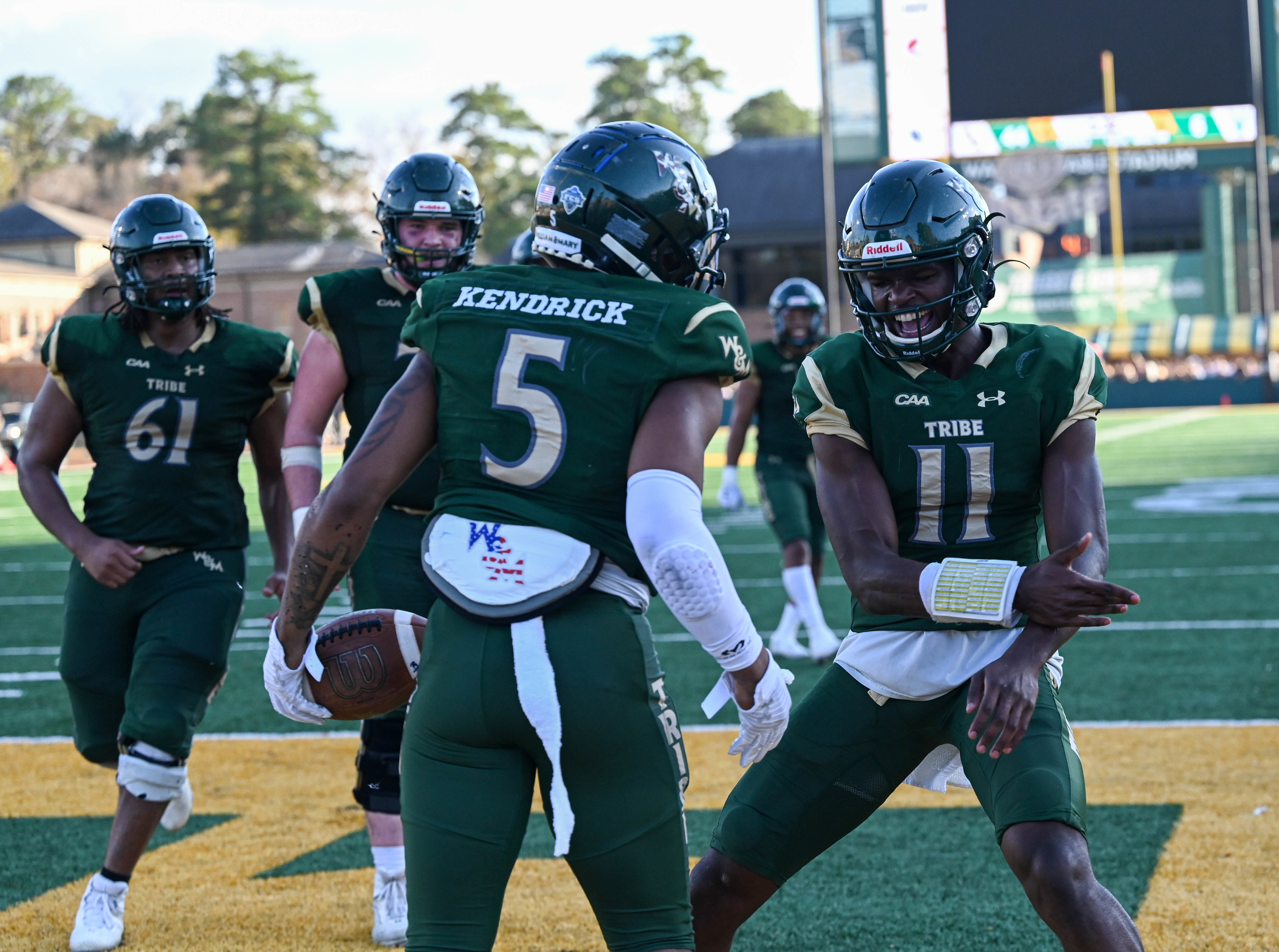
Tribe football players celebrate a touchdown during a game at Zable Stadium in 2022

Formerly known as the "Indians", William & Mary's athletic teams are now known as the "Tribe". The college fields NCAA Division I teams for men and women in basketball, cross country, golf, gymnastics, soccer, swimming, tennis, and indoor and outdoor track and field. Also, there are women's field hockey, lacrosse, and volleyball squads, as well as men's baseball and football. In the 2004–05 season, the Tribe garnered five Colonial Athletic Association titles, leading the conference with over 80 titles. That same year, several teams competed in the NCAA Championships, with the football team appearing in the Division I-AA national semifinals. The men's cross country team finished 8th and 5th in Division I NCAA Men's Cross Country Championship in 2006 and 2009, respectively. The William & Mary men's basketball team is one of four original Division I schools that have never been to the NCAA Division I men's basketball tournament.

In May 2006, the NCAA ruled that the athletic logo, which includes two green and gold feathers, could create an environment offensive to the American Indian community. The college's appeal regarding using the institution's athletic logo to the NCAA Executive Committee was rejected. The "Tribe" nickname was found to be neither hostile nor abusive but rather communicates ennobling sentiments of commitment, shared idealism, community, and common cause. The college stated it would phase out the use of the two feathers by the fall of 2007. However, they can still be seen prominently painted on streets throughout the campus. In 2018, athletic director Samantha Huge introduced a new brand kit for the department, officially retiring and de-emphasizing the script "Tribe" logo.

The "Tribe 2025" plan, a comprehensive plan for the athletics department to raise national prominence, undergo significant facilities upgrades, and achieve higher levels of student involvement and spirit, was presented in 2019. In 2020, William & Mary announced that due to financial concerns, they would be discontinuing seven varsity sports: men's and women's gymnastics, men's and women's swimming, men's indoor and outdoor track and field and volleyball. This decision prompted a petition entitled "save the Tribe 7" which received significant support. On October 19, the university reinstated women's gymnastics, women's swimming, and volleyball after notice of an impending lawsuit on the grounds of Title IX violations. President Rowe later announced that the decision to cancel the four men's programs would be put off until the 2021–2022 academic year.

Beginning in the 2026 season, the Tribe football team will compete as an associate member of the Patriot League. The College’s other varsity programs will continue to participate in the Coastal Athletic Association.

== Notable people ==
=== Faculty ===
Since the 17th century, many prominent academics have chosen to teach at William & Mary. Distinguished faculty include the first professor of law in the United States, George Wythe (who taught Henry Clay, John Marshall, and Thomas Jefferson, among others); William Small (Thomas Jefferson's cherished mentor); William and Thomas Dawson, who were also presidents of William & Mary. Also, the founder and first president of the Massachusetts Institute of Technology – William Barton Rogers – taught chemistry at William & Mary (which was also Professor Barton's alma mater). Several members of the socially elite and politically influential Tucker family, including Nathaniel Beverley, St. George, and Henry St. George Tucker Sr. (who penned the original honor code pledge for the University of Virginia that remains in use there today), taught at William & Mary.

William & Mary recruited the constitutional scholar William Van Alstyne from Duke Law School. Lawrence Wilkerson, current Harriman Visiting Professor of Government and Public Policy, was chief of staff for Colin Powell. Susan Wise Bauer is an author and founder of Peace Hill Press, who teaches writing and American literature at the college. James Axtell, who teaches history, was inducted into the American Academy of Arts and Sciences as a Fellow in 2004. Iyabo Obasanjo, a previous senator of Nigeria and daughter of former President Olusegun Obasanjo of Nigeria, also serves as faculty in Kinesiology & Health Sciences.

Professor Benjamin Bolger, the second-most credentialed person in modern history behind Michael Nicholson, taught at W&M.

=== Alumni ===
Although historically a small college, alumni of William & Mary include many influential and historically significant people, including four of the first ten presidents of the United States, four United States Supreme Court justices, dozens of U.S. senators, six Rhodes Scholars, and three Marshall Scholars.

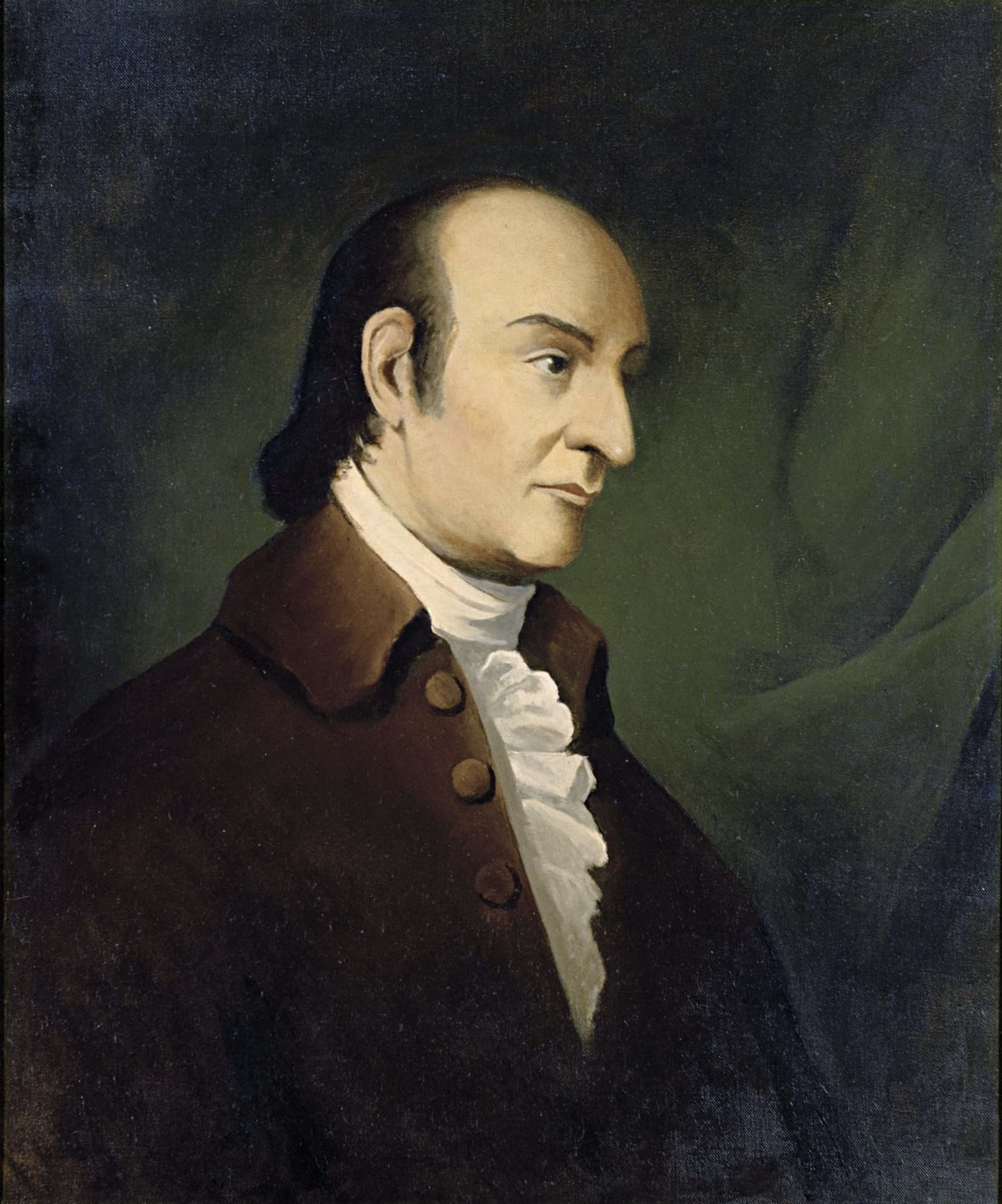
Member of Continental Congress (1775–76) and signer of U.S. Declaration of Independence (1776), George Wythe (1746, attended)

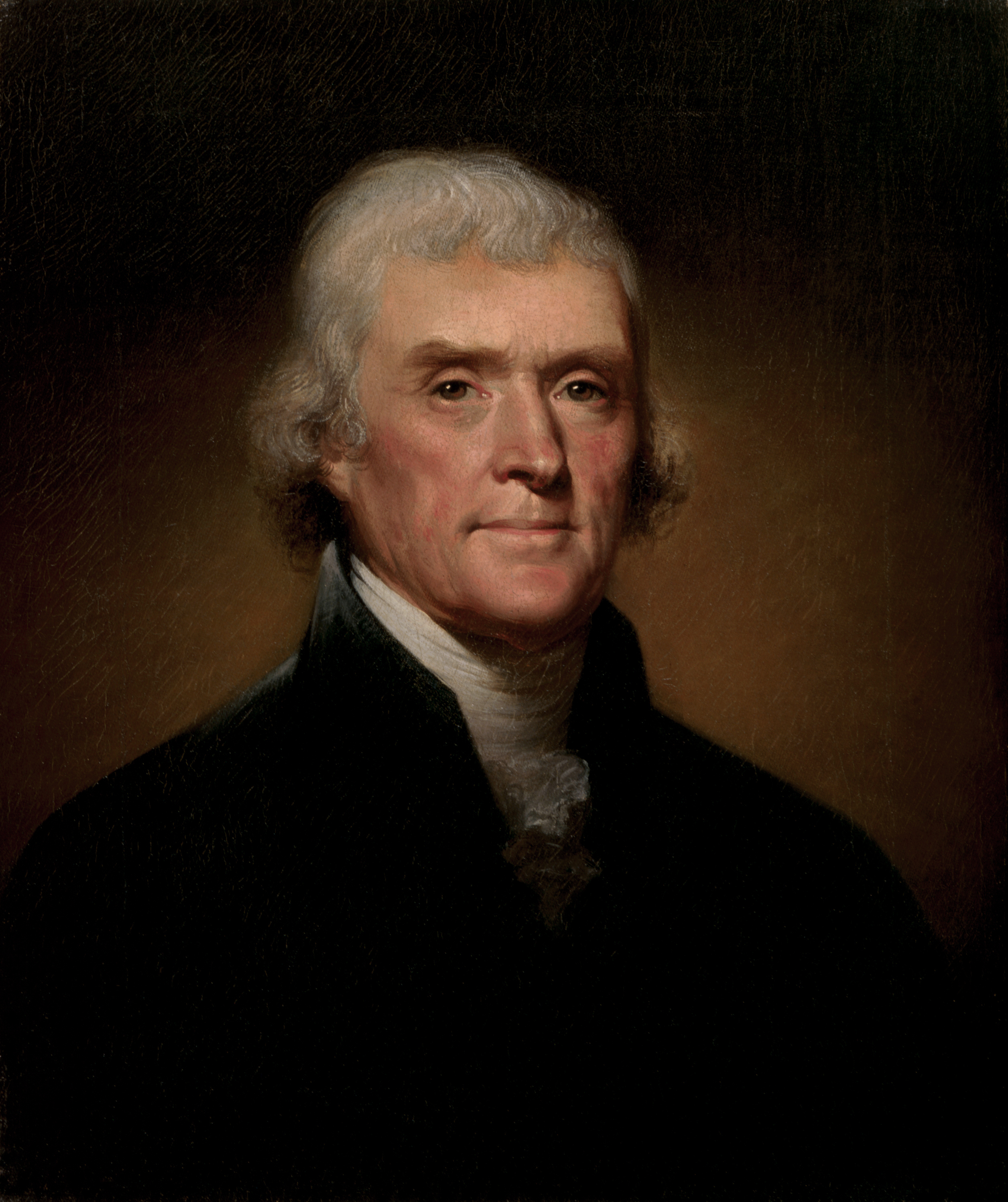
Third U.S. President, Thomas Jefferson (1762, attended)

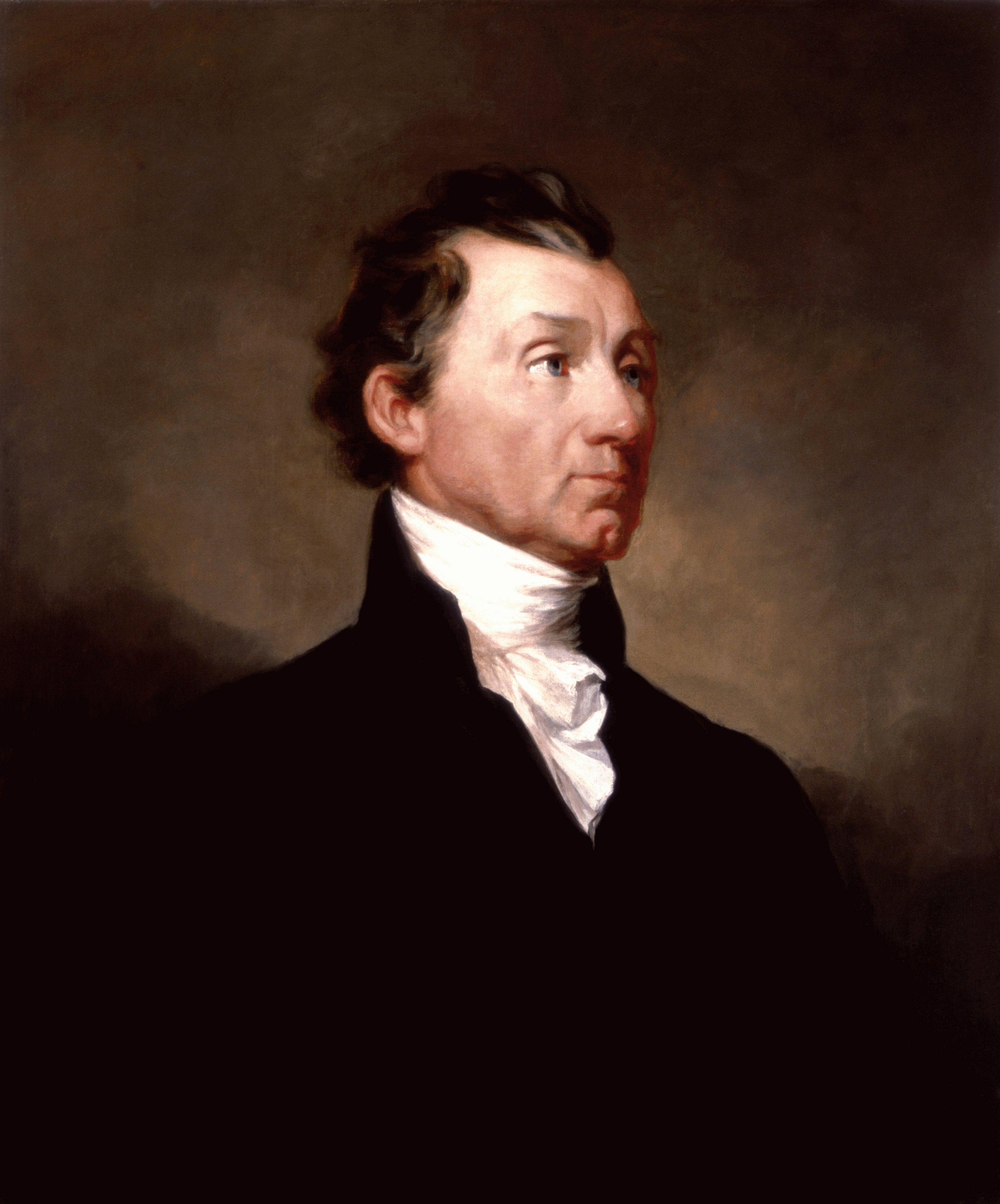
5th U.S. President, James Monroe (1776, attended)

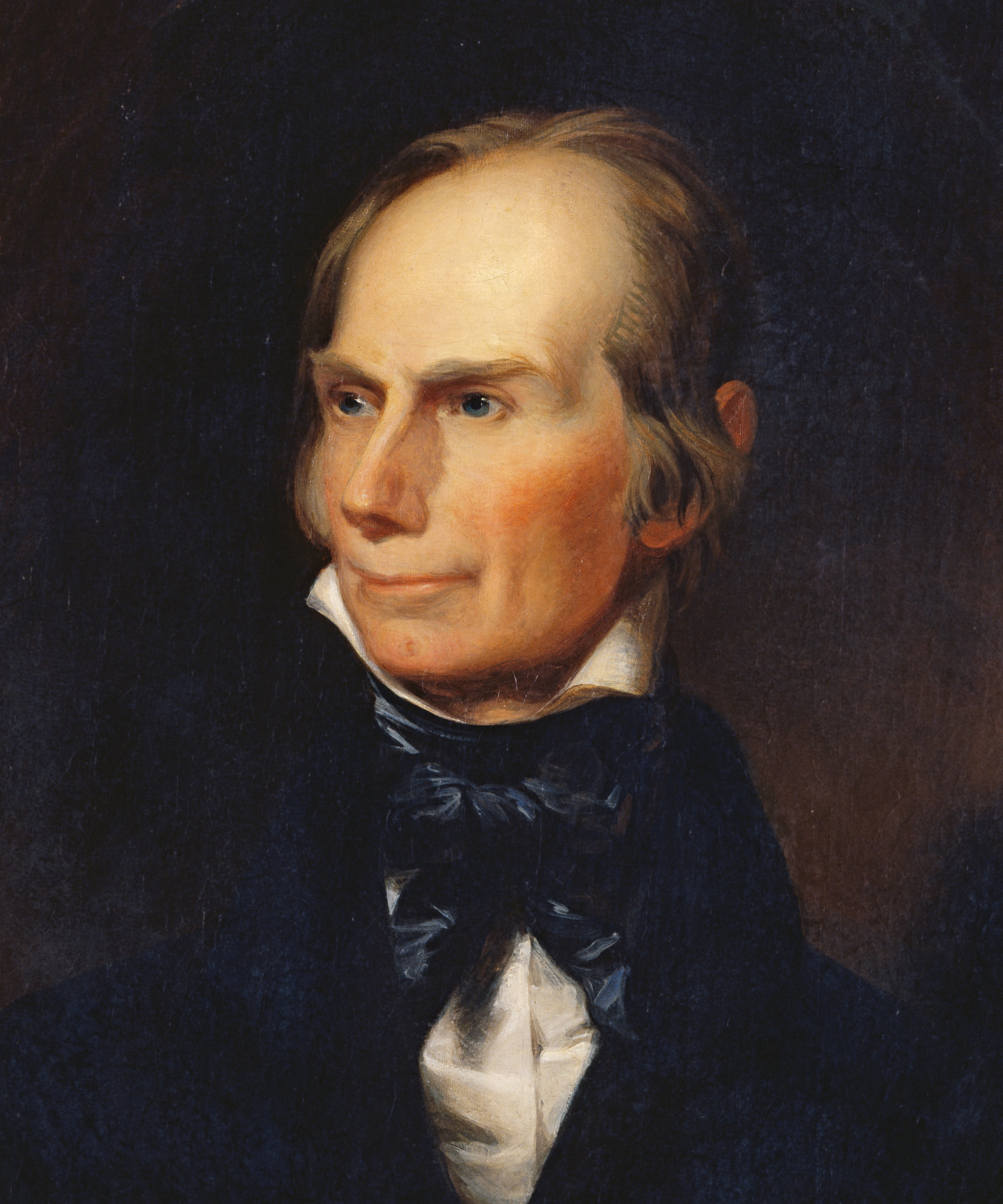
9th U.S. Secretary of State and founder of the Whig Party, Henry Clay (class of 1797)

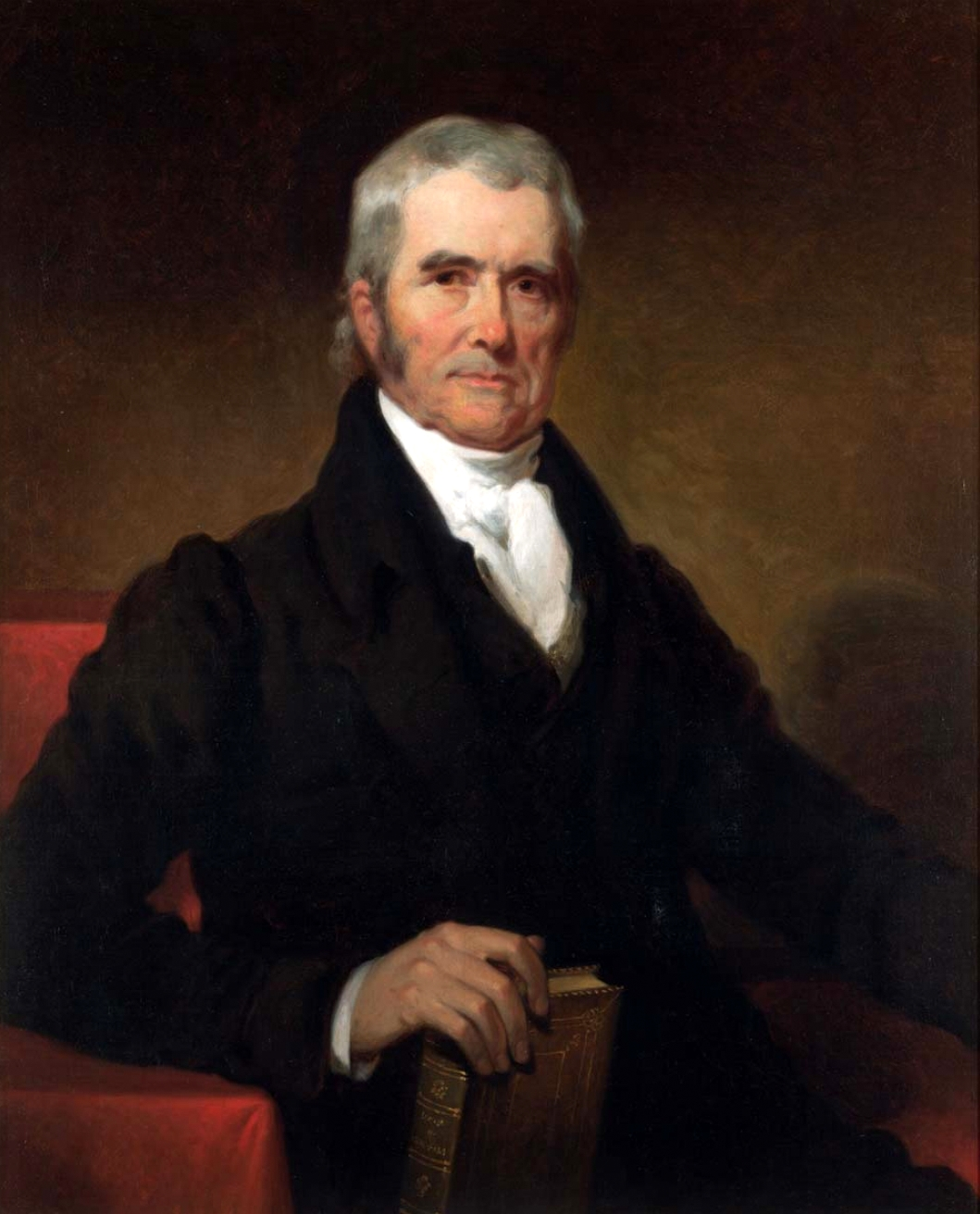
Chief Justice of the United States from 1801 to 1835, John Marshall (Attended)

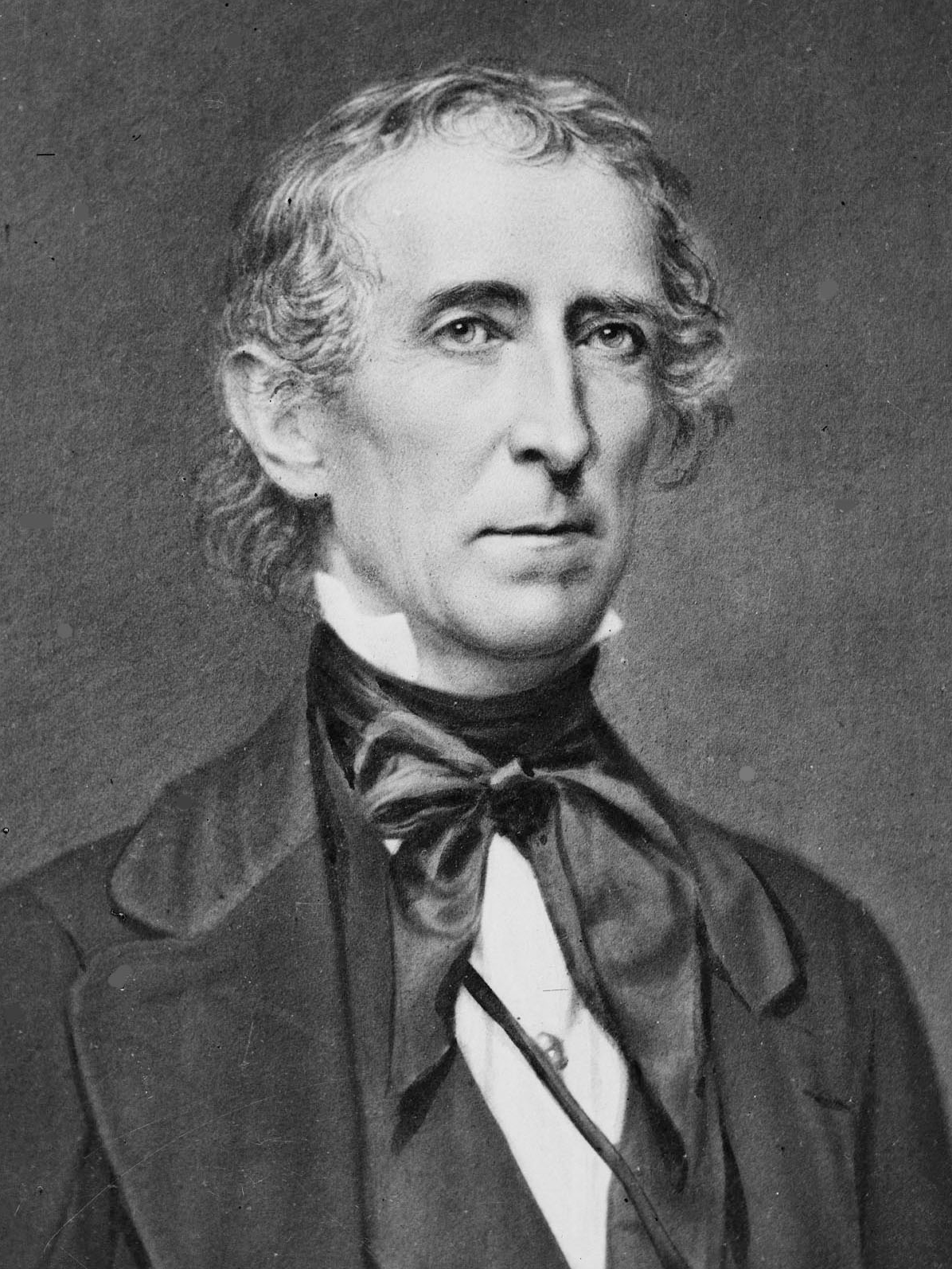
10th U.S. President, John Tyler (class of 1807)

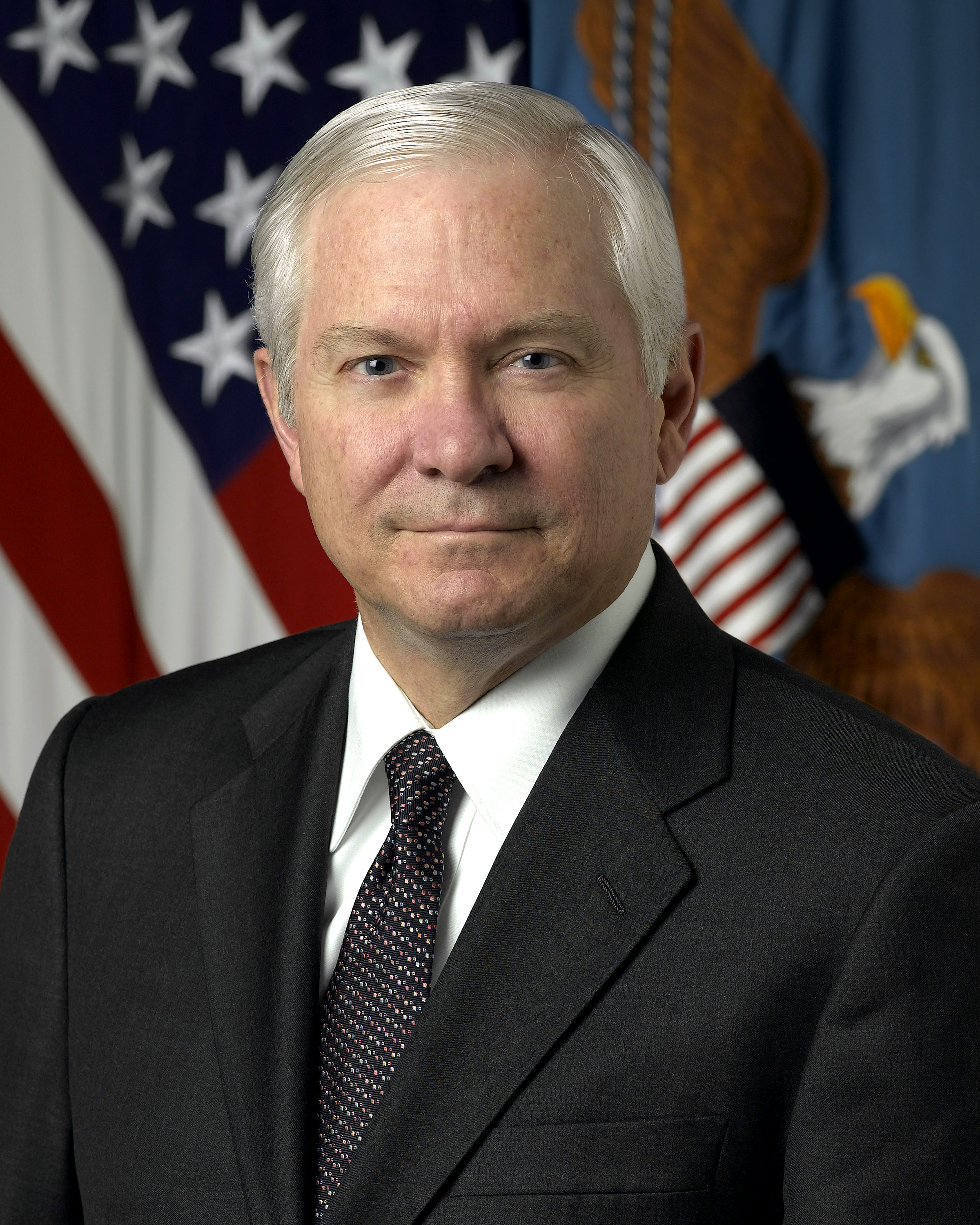
22nd United States Secretary of Defense and 24th Chancellor, Robert Gates (class of 1965)

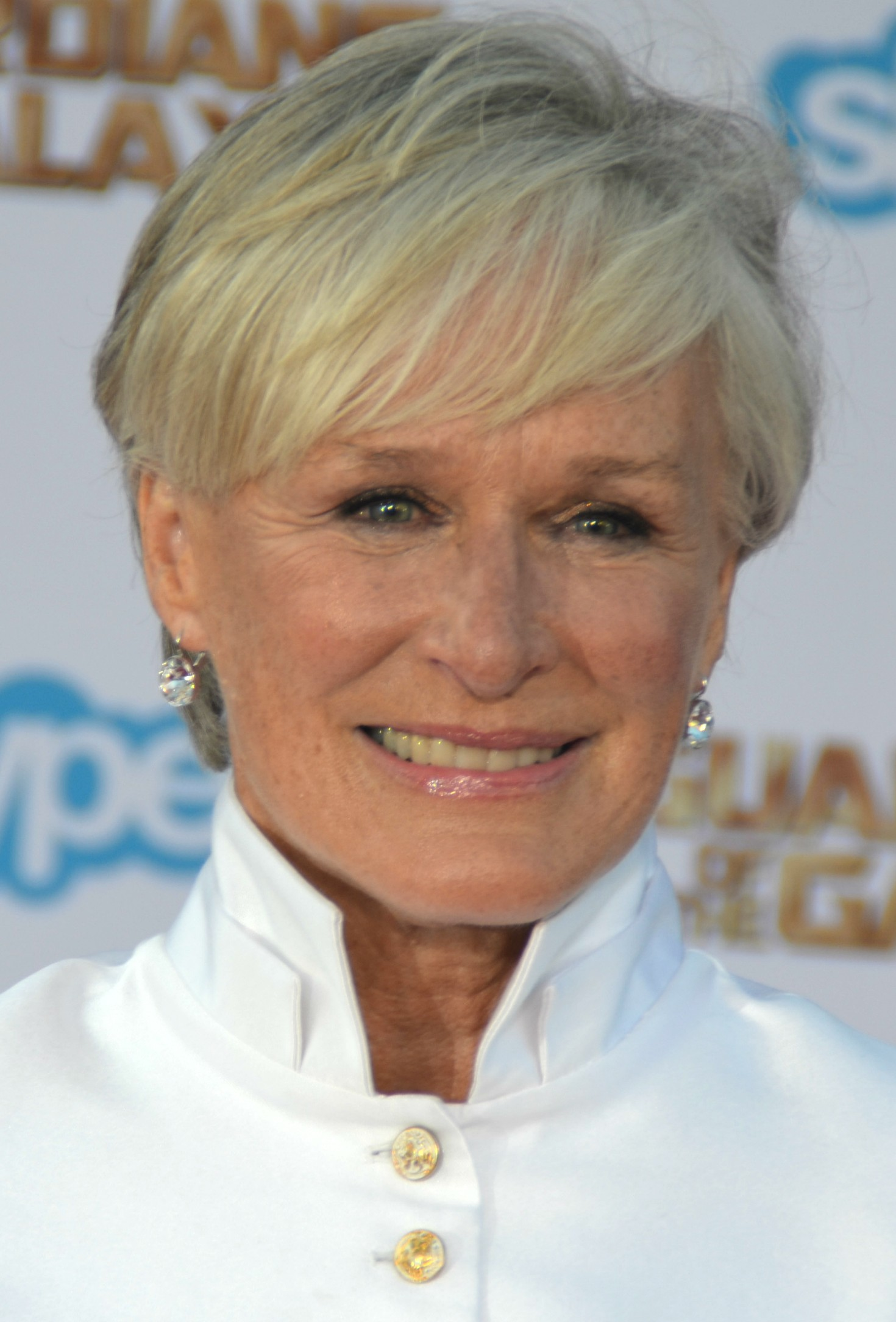
American actress, Glenn Close (class of 1974)

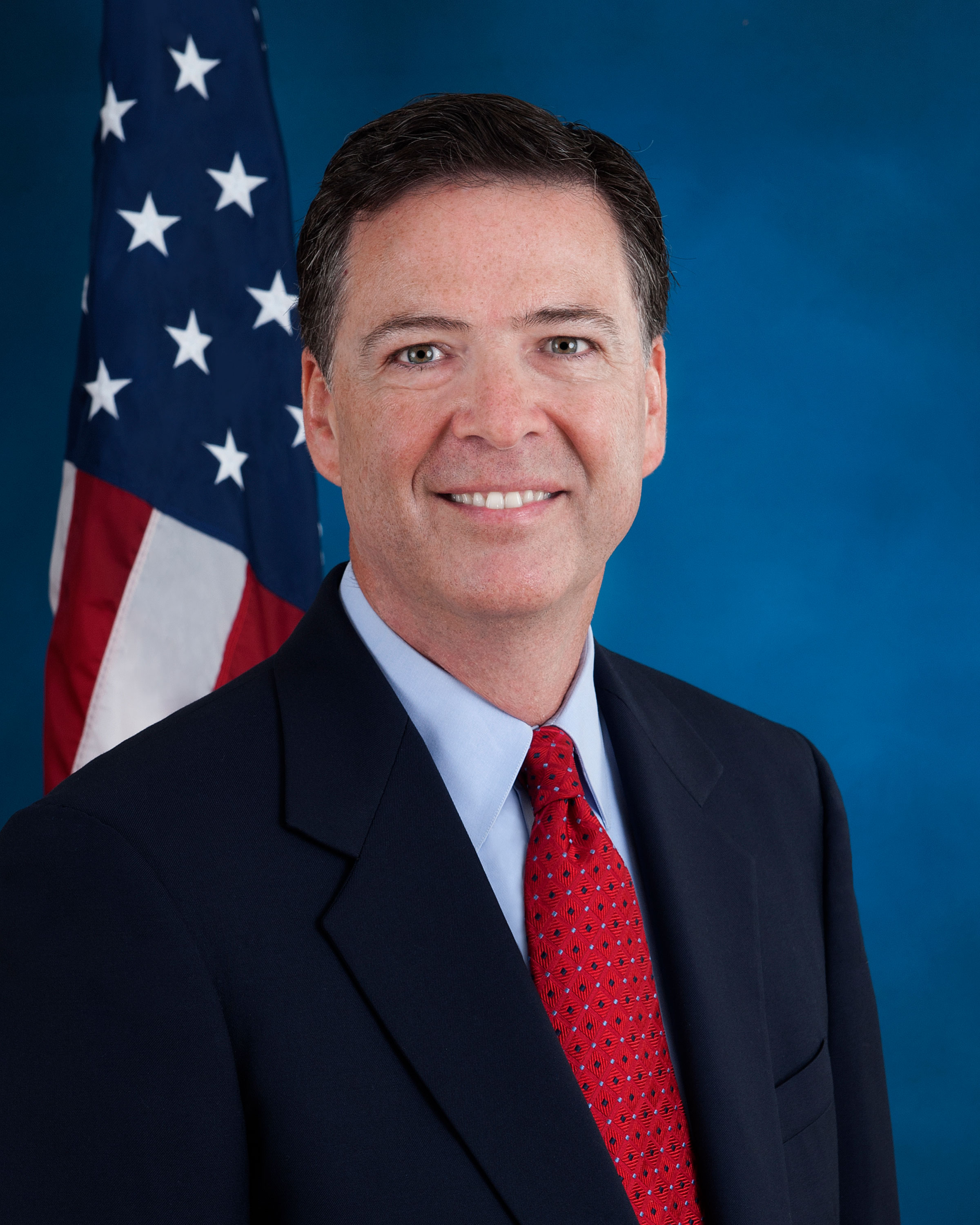
7th Director of the Federal Bureau of Investigation, James Comey (class of 1982)

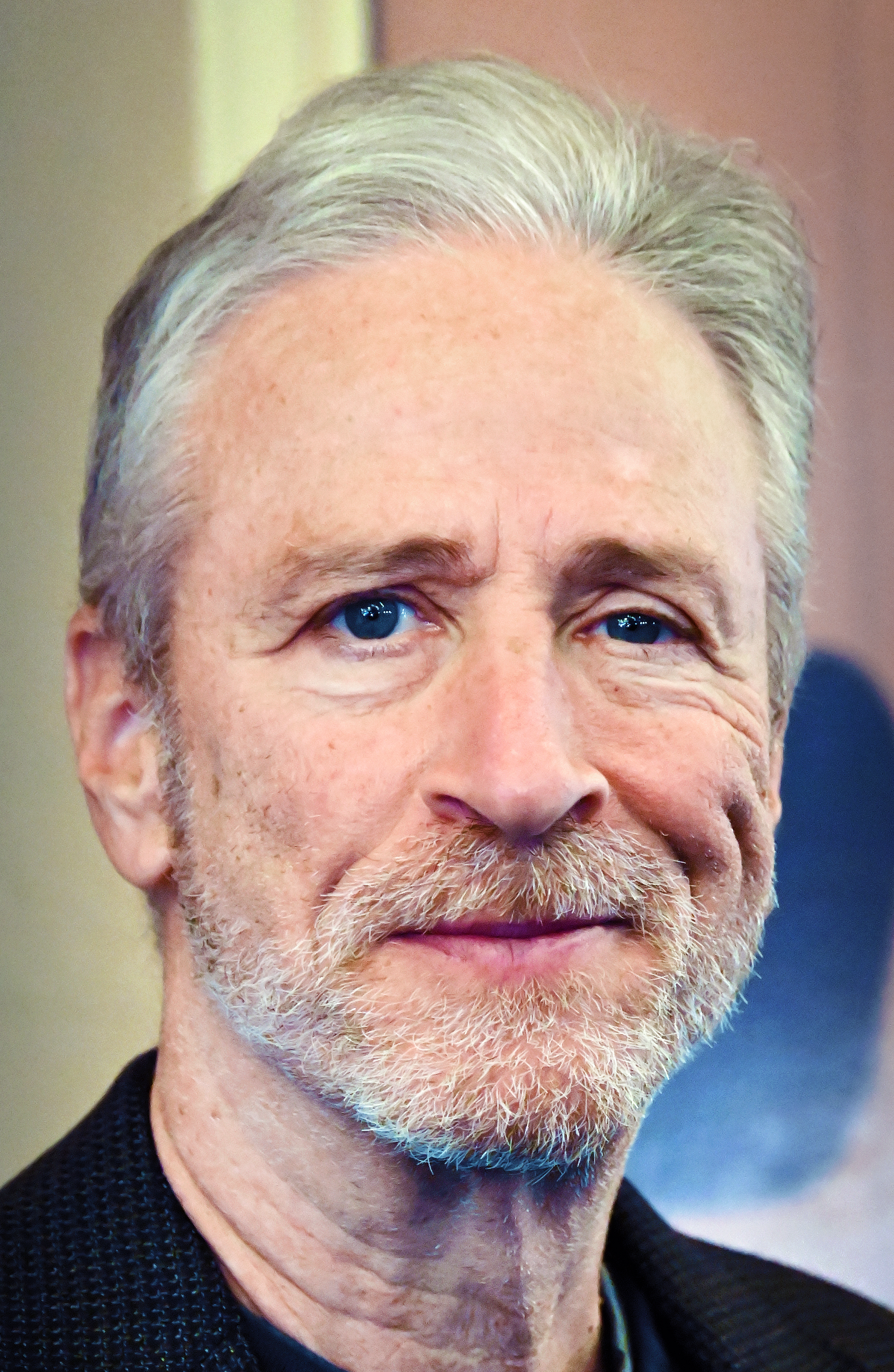
American comedian, Jon Stewart (class of 1984)

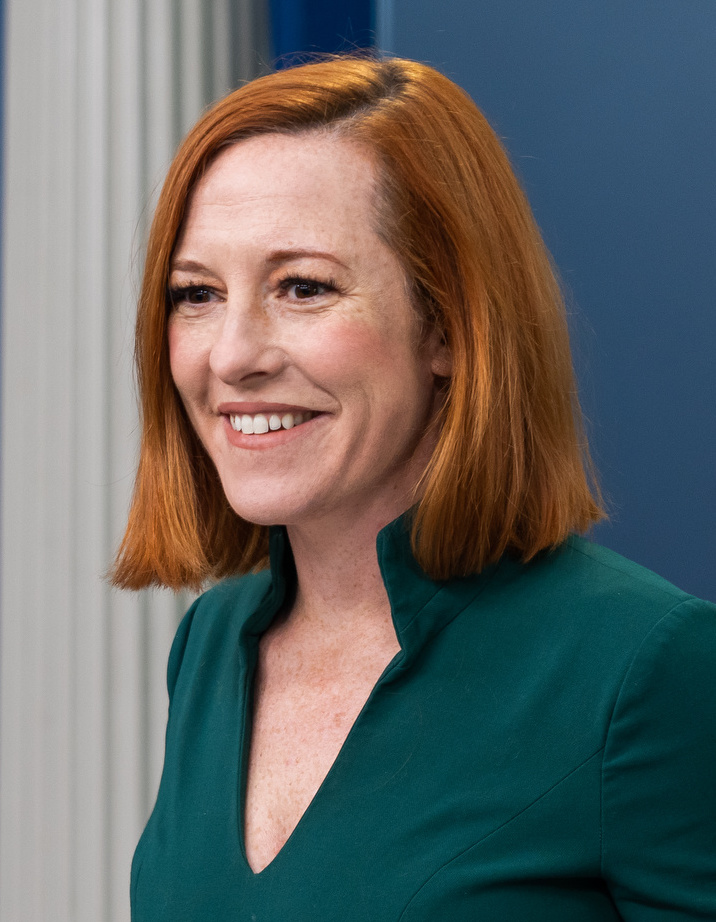
34th White House Press Secretary, Jen Psaki (class of 2000)

== In popular culture ==
=== Television ===
- The main characters in NBC's "Scrubs" are William and Mary Graduates.
- The HBO television mini-series "John Adams" was partially filmed on campus.
- The protagonist of "Dirty, Sexy, Money" was a graduate of the college of William and Mary.

=== Music ===
- Steely Dan's 1973 song "My Old School" contains a line which references the College of William and Mary.
- Davis Daniel's 1994 song "William and Mary" references the college in its chorus.

== See also ==
- Williamsburg Bray School
- William & Mary scandal of 1951
- History of education in the Southern United States
- Public Ivy
