= Nu Kappa Epsilon =

Music sorority founded at the College of William and Mary in 1994

- ΝΚΕ
- Founded: August 25, 1994; 32 years ago College of William & Mary
- Type: Professional
- Affiliation: Independent
- Status: Active
- Emphasis: Music
- Scope: National
- Colors: Hunter Green and Burgundy
- Flower: White rose
- Mascot: Songbird
- Philanthropy: Songs for Kids Foundation
- Chapters: 3 active
- Headquarters: Williamsburg, Virginia; United States

Nu Kappa Epsilon (ΝΚΕ) is an American collegiate music appreciation sorority. It was established at the College of William & Mary in 1994. Since its founding NKE has established three additional chapters.

== History ==
Nu Kappa Epsilon was established at the College of William & Mary on August 25, 1994 by Anne Steinbach. Its purpose is "to promote the growth and development of musical activities and appreciation on campus and in the community where chapters have been formed and to develop in the members the best qualities of character through music."

The founding members of Nu Kappa Epsilon were:

- Anne Steinbach, president
- Laura Fejfar, vice president
- Liz Shiflett, secretary
- Susanna Smith, treasurer
- Alison Armstrong
- Shannon Ashley
- Sarah Balcom
- Kelley Bartell
- Heather Carter
- Holly Collins
- Brenda Herrold
- Erin Jones
- Anne Marks
- Leanna McCoy
- Shannon Mully
- Kristi Ramey
- Karen Supetran
- Tina Tennenhaus
- Chisty Wright
- Kristen Yates

The sorority was created in an attempt to garner attention from the International Music Fraternity for Women, Sigma Alpha Iota (SAI). However, upon being offered colony status by SAI, NKE officers decided that the transition would involve the loss of sisters who did not meet the music class requirements of SAI. To maintain its founding purpose and inclusiveness, NKE chose to remain separate from SAI.

Beta chapter was installed on March 14, 2005, at Christopher Newport University in Newport News, Virginia. Gamma chapter was chartered at Virginia Tech in 2015, but has since gone inactive. The group became a national sorority with the addition of Delta chapter at Cornell University in 2020.

== Symbols ==
The sorority's flower is the white rose. Its colors are hunter green and burgundy. Its mascot is the songbird.

== Membership ==
Membership is open to female students of any major who appreciate music.

== Activities ==
The chapters participate in a variety of social activities and also attend concerts and recitals. Alpha chapter hosts NKoachella each semester, a concert featuring student performers that raises money for Musicians on Call. Its members teach music classes at local elementary schools. Alpha chapter is also one of the sponsors and participates in the Sinfonicron Light Opera Company.

== Philanthropy ==
Nu Kappa Epsilon supports its communities through both music and time. Each chapter chooses a music-related philanthropy to support. The chapters raise funds and awareness for organizations such as Guitars Not Guns, Out of the Darkness, Playing for Change, Relay for Life, the Songs for Kids Foundation, and Musicians on Call.

== Chapters ==
Following is a list of Nu Kappa Epsilon chapters. Active chapters are indicated in bold. Inactive chapters are in italics.

Chapter	Charter date and range	Institution	Location	Status	Ref.
**Alpha**	August 25, 1994	College of William & Mary	Williamsburg, Virginia	Active	
**Beta**	March 14, 2005	Christopher Newport University	Newport News, Virginia	Active	
Gamma	March 28, 2015 – 20xx ?	Virginia Tech	Blacksburg, Virginia	Inactive	
Delta	September 6, 2020 -- 2022	Cornell University	Ithaca, New York	Inactive	

== See also ==
- Professional fraternities and sororities
