= The Virginia Informer =

Student-run publication at The College of William and Mary, U.S.

- Type: monthly newspaper
- Owner(s): Students of the College of William & Mary
- Staff writers: 18
- Founded: 2005
- Language: English
- Headquarters: Williamsburg, Virginia
- Circulation: 2,000
- Price: Free
- Website: http://www.virginia-informer.com

The Virginia Informer was a student-run publication at The College of William & Mary in Williamsburg, Virginia. The newspaper contained five sections: News, Features, Sports, Arts & Culture, and Opinion. It was a member of the Collegiate Network and a member of the Associated Collegiate Press.

Unlike other primary campus publications, The DoG Street Journal and The Flat Hat, it received no funding from the college administration or student activity fee for any of its operations but rather from grants, subscriptions, advertising and donations. The Informer was known to publish conservative and libertarian editorials.

In March 2010, the paper celebrated its fifth anniversary in Miller Hall at the Mason School of Business with guests including Congressman Rob Wittman, William & Mary President W. Taylor Reveley III, Miss Virginia USA 2010 Samantha Casey, members of the Williamsburg City Council, senior business executives, alumni and faculty, and student leaders.

The Virginia Informer transitioned from bimonthly to weekly printing in early 2010 and added a Sports section later that year, the first new section since the paper's founding in 2005. However, in January 2013, The Informer began printing monthly. After several semesters of infrequent publication, The Virginia Informer ceased operating in 2016.

== Awards ==
- 2006 Collegiate Network Best New Paper
- 2007 Samuel Adams Alliance National Sunshine Award Nominee
- 2008 Fund for American Studies – Robert Novak Collegiate Journalism Award Finalist
- 2008 Collegiate Network Paper of the Year
- 2009 Collegiate Network Paper of the Year
- 2010 William F. Buckley Jr. Award for Outstanding Campus Reporting
- 2011–2012 Collegiate Network Paper of the Year

== Issues and positions ==
=== Board of Visitors party ===
In early 2006, The Informer printed the name of a female student who accused a fellow student of rape at a sorority party held at the house of a member of the Board of Visitors. The Informer also called on that member, John Gerdelman, to resign. This was also in response to an e-mail sent to students by Vice President for Student Affairs Sam Sadler about the incident that included the name of the accused. The Informer did not print the name of the female student, a matter of public record, until the case had been settled out of court.

=== NCAA and the feathers ===
In 2006, the NCAA informed the College that it would need to remove the feathers from its athletic logo saying that they were hostile and abusive towards Native Americans. Even though then-President Gene Nichol expressed his disagreement with the decision, he did not challenge the decision, fearing that the court costs would take too much from the college fund. He refused donations from alumni wishing to fund the legal expenses of such a fight. Since then, the Informer has distributed 30,000 feathers at Homecoming football games in protest.

=== Wren Cross ===
The Virginia Informer had been outspoken against former President Nichol's decision to implement a policy in which a historic cross was removed from the nondenominational Wren Chapel unless requested by a student group as well as his management of College finances. The Informer sponsored a debate on the subject between religion professor David Holmes and author Dinesh D'Souza. Nichol was offered an opportunity to participate in the debate but declined.

=== Campus Free Speech ===
The Virginia Informer advocated for expanding free speech rights at William & Mary. In early 2008, the publication worked with free speech advocate and W&M student Braum Katz as well as the Foundation for Individual Rights in Education (FIRE) to have the college administration turn the school into a FIRE "Green Light" university. Such a designation would bring William & Mary's speech code in line with FIRE's interpretation of the US Constitution and, according to Katz, make the college one of the most free speech friendly universities in the United States. In Fall 2009, the College administration fully amended university speech codes and William & Mary was designated a FIRE "Green Light" institution.

=== 'Three person' rule ===
In Fall 2008, The Informer broke the story about threatened lawsuits against the residents of 711 Richmond Road. Documents revealed that an informant had meticulously documented student parking patterns, and that the city used this information to sue the residents for not being in compliance with the ordinance. In Fall 2009 The Informer was the first publication to break the news of a massive wave of eviction orders for student renters violating the ordinance. Nine houses were affected, ultimately resulting in a modification of the three-person ordinance.

=== Fall 2009 student survey ===
In October 2009, The Virginia Informer conducted a large-scale survey of 233 randomly selected on-campus students. It was conducted ahead of the May 2010 Williamsburg municipal elections, in which students overwhelmingly elected Scott Foster to City Council, and the first survey to pose questions on a number of city-related issues and student opinion of the City Council. The survey's results showed students oppose the Three Person Housing Ordinance by a margin of nine to one. The survey also demonstrated that students with a positive attitude towards Williamsburg city government deteriorates significantly with each social class.

== See also ==
- List of publications at The College of William & Mary
- List of student newspapers in the United States of America
