= Williamsburg, Virginia =

City and former capital in Virginia, US

Williamsburg
- Independent city
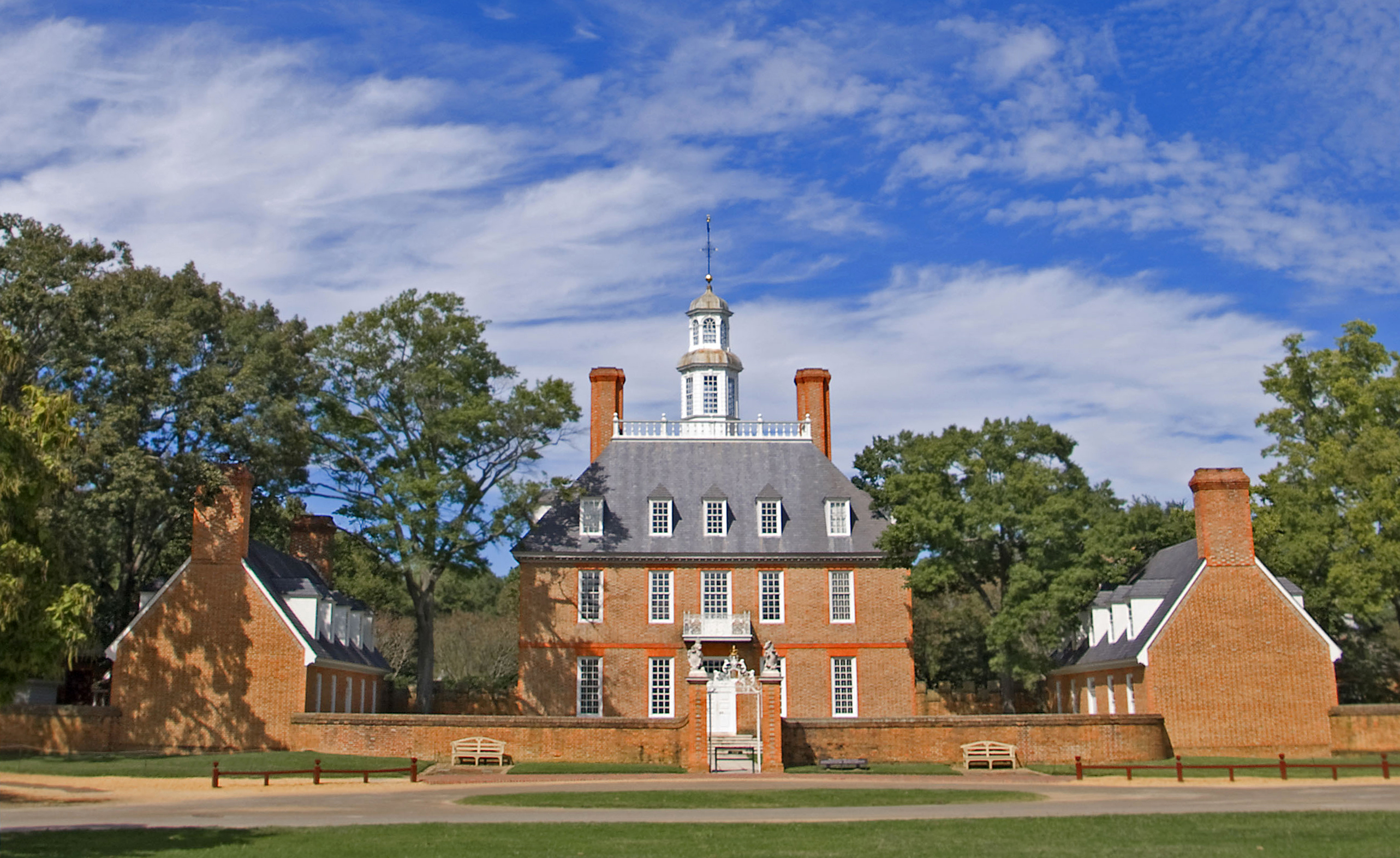
- The Williamsburg Governor's Palace in 2012

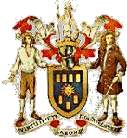
- Flag Seal Coat of arms
- Interactive map of Williamsburg
- Location within Virginia Location within the United States
- Coordinates: 37°16′15″N 76°42′25″W
- Country: United States
- State: Virginia
- Founded: 1699
- Named for: William III of England

Government
  - Mayor: Doug Pons
  - Vice Mayor: Pat Dent

Area
  - Total: 9.10 sq mi (23.57 km^{2})
  - Land: 8.94 sq mi (23.15 km^{2})
  - Water: 0.16 sq mi (0.42 km^{2})
- Elevation: 49 ft (15 m)

Population (2020)
  - Total: 15,425
  - Estimate (2025): 15,861 ▲
  - Density: 1,726/sq mi (666.3/km^{2})
- Time zone: UTC−5 (EST)
  - Summer (DST): UTC−4 (EDT)
- ZIP codes: 23185-23188
- Area codes: 757, 948
- FIPS code: 51-86160
- GNIS feature ID: 1498551
- Website: williamsburgva.gov

Williamsburg is an independent city in the U.S. state of Virginia. It had a population of 15,425 at the 2020 census. Located on the Virginia Peninsula, Williamsburg is in the northern part of the Hampton Roads metropolitan area. It is bordered by James City County on the west and south and York County on the east.

In 1632, English settlers founded Middle Plantation as a fortified settlement on high ground between the James and York rivers and farther inland than their headquarters at Jamestown. The city of Williamsburg was established at the site of Middle Plantation in 1699. It functioned as the capital of the Colony and Commonwealth of Virginia from 1699 to 1780 and became the center of political events in Virginia leading to the American Revolution. The College of William & Mary, established in Middle Plantation in 1693, is the second-oldest institution of higher education in the United States. Of the nine colonial colleges in the U.S., it is the only one located in the American South. Its alumni include three U.S. presidents as well as many other important figures in the nation's early history.

The city's tourism-based economy is driven by Colonial Williamsburg, the city's restored Historic Area. Along with nearby Jamestown and Yorktown, Williamsburg forms part of the Historic Triangle, which annually attracts more than four million tourists. Modern Williamsburg is also a college town, inhabited in large part by William & Mary students, faculty and staff.

== History ==
Historical Affiliations

Kingdom of Great Britain 1699–1776
United States 1776–1861
Confederate States 1861–1865
United States 1865–present

=== 17th century ===
Before English settlers arrived at Jamestown to establish the Colony of Virginia in 1607, the area that would become Williamsburg formed part of the territory of the Powhatan Confederacy. By the 1630s, English settlements had grown to dominate the lower (eastern) portion of the Virginia Peninsula, and Powhatan tribes had abandoned their nearby villages. Between 1630 and 1633, after the war that followed the Indian massacre of 1622, English colonists constructed a defensive palisade across the peninsula and a settlement named Middle Plantation as a primary guard-station along the palisade.

Jamestown, the original capital of Virginia Colony, burned down during the events of Bacon's Rebellion in 1676. Once Governor William Berkeley had regained control, temporary government headquarters were established about 12 miles (19 km) away on the high ground at Middle Plantation, pending the rebuilding of the Statehouse at Jamestown. The members of the House of Burgesses discovered that the "temporary" location was both safer and more pleasant than Jamestown, which was humid and plagued with mosquitoes.

A school of higher education had long been an aspiration of the colonists. An early attempt at Henricus failed after the Indian massacre of 1622; the location at the outskirts of the developed part of the colony had left it vulnerable to attack. In the 1690s, the colonists again tried to establish a school. They commissioned Reverend James Blair, who spent several years in England lobbying, and finally obtained a royal charter for the desired new school. It was to be named the College of William & Mary in honor of the monarchs of the time. When Blair returned to Virginia, the new school was founded in a safe place, Middle Plantation, in 1693. Classes began in temporary quarters in 1694, and construction soon started on the College Building, a precursor to the Wren Building.

Four years later, in 1698, the rebuilt Statehouse in Jamestown burned down again, this time accidentally. The government again "temporarily" relocated to Middle Plantation, and in addition to the better climate now also enjoyed use of the college's facilities. The college students made a presentation to the House of Burgesses, and it was agreed in 1699 that the colonial capital would move to Middle Plantation permanently. A village was laid out and Middle Plantation was renamed Williamsburg in honor of King William III of England, befitting the town's newly elevated status.

After Williamsburg's designation as the colony's capital, immediate provision was made for construction of a capitol building and for platting the city according to Theodorick Bland's survey. His design utilized the college's extant sites and the almost new Bruton Parish Church as focal points, and placed the new Capitol building opposite the college, with Duke of Gloucester Street connecting them.

Alexander Spotswood, who arrived in Virginia as lieutenant governor in 1710, had several ravines filled and streets leveled, and assisted in erecting additional college buildings, a church, and a magazine for the storage of arms. In 1722, Williamsburg was granted a royal charter as a "city incorporate", which is now believed to be the oldest charter in the United States.

Middle Plantation was included in James City Shire when it was established in 1634, as the colony reached a total population of approximately 5,000. (James City and Virginia's other shires changed their names a few years later; James City Shire then became known as James City County). The middle ground ridge-line was essentially the dividing line with Charles River Shire, which was renamed York County after King Charles I (r. 1625–1649) fell out of favor with the citizens of England. As Middle Plantation (and later Williamsburg) developed, the boundaries were adjusted slightly. For most of the colonial period, the border between the two counties ran down the center of Duke of Gloucester Street.

=== 18th century ===
For almost a century after the 1776 formation both of the Commonwealth of Virginia and of the United States, despite practical complications, the town remained divided between the two counties.

Williamsburg was the site of the first attempted canal in the United States. In 1771, Lord Dunmore, who was Virginia's last Royal Governor, announced plans to connect Archer's Creek, which leads to the James River, with Queen's Creek, leading to the York River. It would have formed a water route across the Virginia Peninsula, but was not completed. Remains of this canal are visible at the rear of the grounds behind the Governor's Palace in Colonial Williamsburg.

In the 1770s, the first purpose-built psychiatric hospital in the United States, the Public Hospital for Persons of Insane and Disordered Minds, was founded in the city. Known in modern times as Eastern State Hospital, it was established by Act of the Virginia colonial legislature on June 4, 1770. The Act to "Make Provision for the Support and Maintenance of Ideots, Lunaticks, and other Persons of unsound Minds" authorized the House of Burgesses to appoint a 15-man Court Of Directors to oversee the hospital's operations and admissions. In 1771, contractor Benjamin Powell constructed a two-story building on Francis Street near the college, capable of housing 24 patients. The design included "yards for patients to walk and take the Air in" as well as provisions for a fence to keep the patients out of the town.

The Gunpowder Incident began in April 1775 as a dispute between Dunmore and Virginia colonists over gunpowder stored in the Williamsburg magazine. Fearing rebellion, Dunmore ordered royal marines to seize gunpowder from the magazine. Virginia militia led by Patrick Henry responded to the "theft" and marched on Williamsburg. A standoff ensued, with Dunmore threatening to destroy the city if attacked by the militia. The dispute was resolved when payment for the powder was arranged. This was an important precursor in the run-up to the American Revolution. Following the Declaration of Independence from Britain, the American Revolutionary War broke out in 1776.

On July 25, 1776, the Declaration of Independence was proclaimed at Williamsburg and received with "applause under discharge of cannon and firing of small arms with illuminations [fireworks] in the evening".

During the war, Virginia's capital was moved again, in 1780, this time to Richmond at the urging of then-Governor Thomas Jefferson, who feared Williamsburg's location made it vulnerable to a British attack. Williamsburg remained a venue for many important conventions during the war.

Williamsburg ceased to be the capital of the new Commonwealth of Virginia in 1780 and went into decline, although not to the degree of Jamestown. Another factor was travel. In the 18th and early 19th-century, transportation in the colony was largely by canals and navigable rivers. As it had been built on "high ground", Williamsburg was not sited on a major water-route, unlike many early U.S. communities. The railroads that began to be built in the 1830s also did not yet come through the city.

=== 19th century ===
Despite Williamsburg's loss of the business activity involved in government, the College of William & Mary continued and expanded, as did the Public Hospital for Persons of Insane and Disordered Minds. The latter became known as Eastern State Hospital.

At the outset of the American Civil War (1861–1865), enlistments in the Confederate Army depleted the College of William & Mary's student body and on May 10, 1861, the faculty voted to close the college for the duration of the war. The College Building served as a Confederate barracks and later as a hospital before being burned by Union forces in 1862.

The Williamsburg area saw combat in the spring of 1862 during the Peninsula Campaign, a Union effort to take Richmond from the east from a base at Fort Monroe. Throughout late 1861 and early 1862, the small contingent of Confederate defenders was known as the Army of the Peninsula, led by General John B. Magruder. He successfully created ruses to fool the invaders as to the size and strength of his forces, and deterred their attack. The subsequent slow Union movement up the peninsula gained valuable time for defenses to be constructed at the Confederate capital at Richmond.

In early May 1862, after holding off Union troops for over a month, the defenders withdrew quietly from the Warwick Line (stretching across the Peninsula between Yorktown and Mulberry Island). As General George McClellan's Union forces crept up the Peninsula to pursue the retreating Confederate forces, a rear-guard force led by General James Longstreet and supported by General J. E. B. Stuart's cavalry blocked their westward progression at the Williamsburg Line. This was a series of 14 redoubts east of town, with earthen Fort Magruder (also known as Redoubt # 6) at the crucial junction of the two major roads leading to Williamsburg from the east. College of William & Mary President Benjamin S. Ewell oversaw the design and construction. He owned a farm in James City County, and had been commissioned as an officer in the Confederate Army after the college closed in 1861.

At the Battle of Williamsburg on May 5, 1862, the defenders succeeded in delaying the Union forces long enough for the retreating Confederates to reach the outer defenses of Richmond.

A siege of Richmond ensued, culminating in the Seven Days Battles (June to July 1862). McClellan's campaign failed to capture Richmond. Meanwhile, on May 6, 1862, Williamsburg had fallen to the Union. The college's Brafferton building operated for a time as quarters for the commanding officer of the Union garrison occupying the town. On September 9, drunken soldiers of the 5th Pennsylvania Cavalry set fire to the College Building, allegedly to prevent Confederate snipers from using it for cover. Williamsburg underwent much damage during the Union occupation, which lasted until September 1865.

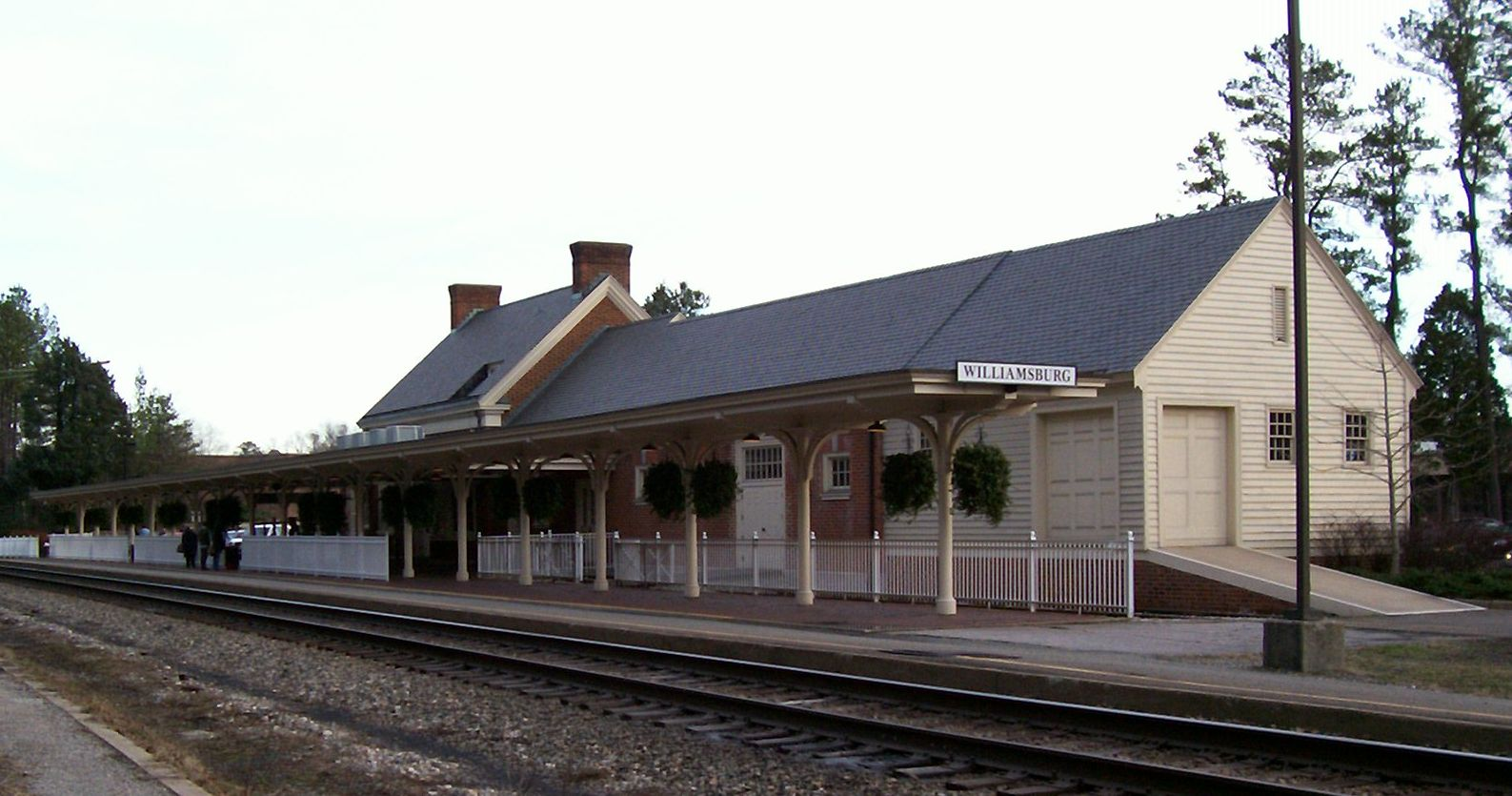
Williamsburg Transportation Center, an intermodal facility located in a restored Chesapeake and Ohio Railway station within walking distance of Colonial Williamsburg's Historic Area, the College of William & Mary, and the downtown area

In 1881, Collis P. Huntington's Chesapeake and Ohio Railway (C&O) built its Peninsula Extension through the area, eventually establishing six stations in Williamsburg and the surrounding area. The Peninsula Extension was good news for the farmers and merchants of the Virginia Peninsula, and they generally welcomed the railroad, which aided passenger travel and shipping. Williamsburg allowed tracks to be placed down Duke of Gloucester Street and even directly through the ruins of the capitol building. (They were later relocated, and Collis Huntington's real-estate arm, Old Dominion Land Company, donated the site to the forerunner of the Association for the Preservation of Virginia Antiquities.)

The railroad's main purpose was shipping eastbound West Virginia bituminous coal to Newport News. Using the new coal piers, coal was loaded aboard large colliers in the harbor of Hampton Roads for shipment to New England and to export destinations worldwide.

Due in no small part to President Ewell's efforts, education continued at the College of William & Mary, although teaching was temporarily suspended for financial reasons from 1882 to 1888. Ewell's efforts to restore the school and its programs during and after Reconstruction became legendary in Williamsburg and at the college, and were ultimately successful, with funding both from the U.S. Congress and from the Commonwealth of Virginia. In 1888, the college secured $10,000 from the General Assembly of the Commonwealth and established a normal school to educate teachers; in 1906, the General Assembly modified the college charter, took ownership of the college buildings and grounds, and assumed primary responsibility for funding it. Ewell remained in Williamsburg as President Emeritus of the college until his death in 1894.

Beginning in the 1890s, C&O land agent Carl M. Bergh, a Norwegian-American who had earlier farmed in the midwestern states, realized that eastern Virginia's gentler climate and depressed post-Civil War land prices would be attractive to his fellow Scandinavians who were farming in other northern parts of the country. He began sending out notices and selling land. Soon there was a substantial concentration of relocated Americans of Norwegian, Swedish, and Danish descent in the area. The location earlier known as Vaiden's Siding on the railroad just west of Williamsburg in James City County was renamed Norge. These citizens and their descendants found the local conditions favorable, and many became leading merchants, tradespersons, and farmers in the community.

=== 20th century ===
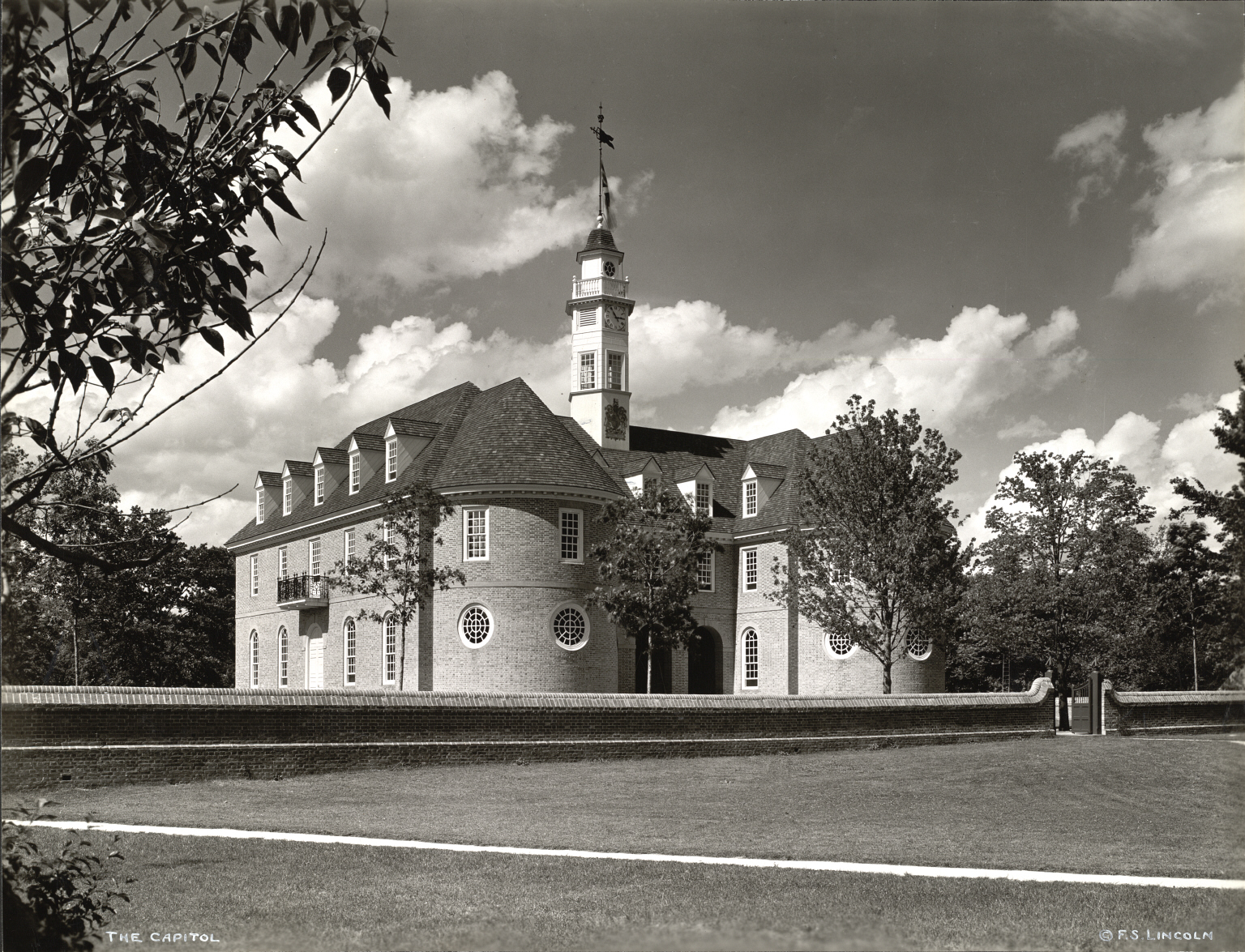
The Capitol Building depicted in a silver gelatin photograph, c. 1934

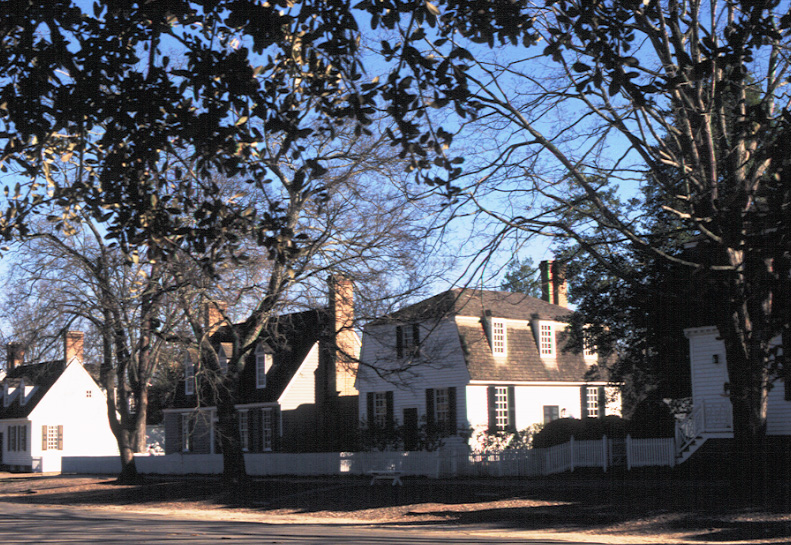
Colonial Williamsburg

The 9th G7 summit in 1983 in front of the Historic Capitol Building

In the early 20th century, Williamsburg remained a sleepy small town. Some newer structures were interspersed with colonial-era buildings, but the town was much less progressive than Virginia's other, busier communities of similar size. Some local lore indicates that the residents liked it that way, as described in longtime Virginia Peninsula journalist, author and historian Parke S. Rouse Jr.'s work. On June 26, 1912, the Richmond Times-Dispatch published an editorial that dubbed Williamsburg "Lotusburg," for "Tuesday was election day in Williamsburg but nobody remembered it. The clerk forgot to wake the electoral board, the electoral board could not arouse itself long enough to have the ballots printed, the candidates forgot they were running, the voters forgot they were alive."

But even if such complacency existed, one Episcopal priest dreamed of expanding and changing Williamsburg's future to give it a new major purpose, turning much of it into a massive living museum. In the early 20th century, the Reverend Dr. W. A. R. Goodwin of Williamsburg's Bruton Parish Church championed one of the nation's largest historic restorations. Initially, Goodwin just aimed to save his historic church building. This he had accomplished by 1907, in time for the 300th anniversary of the founding of the Episcopal Church in Virginia. But upon returning to Williamsburg in 1923 after serving a number of years in upstate New York, he realized that many of the other remaining colonial-era buildings were also in deteriorating condition.

Goodwin dreamed of a much larger restoration along the lines of what he had accomplished with his church. Of modest means, he sought support and financing from a number of sources before successfully attracting the interest and major financial support of Standard Oil heir and philanthropist John D. Rockefeller Jr. and his wife Abby Aldrich Rockefeller. Their combined efforts created Colonial Williamsburg, restoring much of downtown Williamsburg and developing a 301-acre (1.22 km^{2}) Historic Area celebrating the patriots and early history of the colonial-era.

As of 2022, Colonial Williamsburg is Virginia's largest tourist attraction by attendance and the cornerstone of the Historic Triangle, with Jamestown and Yorktown joined by the Colonial Parkway. In the 21st century, Williamsburg has continued to update and refine its attractions. There are more features designed to attract modern children and to offer better and additional interpretation of the black American experience in the town. A century after Goodwin's work began, Colonial Williamsburg remains a work in progress.

In addition to Colonial Williamsburg, the city's railroad station was restored to become an intermodal passenger facility. In nearby James City County, the c. 1908 C&O Railway combination passenger and freight station at Norge was preserved and, with a donation from CSX Transportation, relocated in 2006 to a site at the Williamsburg Regional Library's Croaker Branch. Other landmarks outside the historic area include Carter's Grove and Gunston Hall.

In 1932, a Catholic church was built to minister to students at the College of William & Mary. Old Saint Bede was made a national shrine, dedicated to Our Lady of Walsingham.

On October 22, 1976, the third of three debates between Republican President Gerald Ford and Democratic challenger Jimmy Carter in the 1976 presidential election was held at Phi Beta Kappa Memorial Hall at the College of William & Mary, during which both candidates, perhaps in tribute to the historic venue and the United States Bicentennial celebration, spoke of a "new spirit" in America.

The 9th G7 summit took place in Williamsburg in 1983. The participants discussed the growing debt-crisis, arms control and greater cooperation between the Soviet Union and the G7 (subsequently the G8). At the end of the meeting, Secretary of State George P. Shultz read to the press a statement confirming the deployment of American Pershing II-nuclear missiles in West Germany later in 1983.

=== 21st century ===
On May 3, 2007, Britain's Queen Elizabeth II visited Jamestown and Williamsburg. She had previously visited Williamsburg in 1957. Many world leaders, including President George W. Bush, visited Jamestown to mark its 400th anniversary. The celebration began in part in 2005 with events leading up to the anniversary, and was celebrated statewide throughout 2007, though the official festivities took place during the first week of May.

On February 5, 2009, President Barack Obama took his first trip aboard Air Force One to a House Democrats retreat in the city to attend and address their "Issues Conference".

== Geography ==
According to the United States Census Bureau, the city has an area of 9.1 square miles (23.6 km^{2}), of which 8.94 square miles (23.2 km^{2}) is land and 0.16 square miles (0.4 km^{2}) (1.8%) is water.

Williamsburg stands upon a ridge on the Virginia Peninsula between the James and York Rivers. Queen's Creek and College Creek partly encircle the city. James City County is to the west and south and York County to the north and east. As with all cities in Virginia, Williamsburg is legally independent of both counties.

The city is on the I-64 corridor, 45 miles (72 km) southeast of Richmond and about 37 miles (60 km) northwest of Norfolk. It is in the northwest corner of Hampton Roads, the nation's 37th-largest metropolitan area, with a population of 1,576,370. Within Hampton Roads, Norfolk is recognized as the central business district, while the Virginia Beach seaside resort district and Williamsburg are primarily tourism centers.

=== Climate ===
Williamsburg is in the humid subtropical climate zone, with cool to mild winters, and hot, humid summers. Due to the inland location, winters are slightly cooler and spring days slightly warmer than in Norfolk, though lows average 3.2 °F (1.8 °C) cooler here due to the substantial urban buildup to the southeast. Snowfall averages 4.3 inches (11 cm) per season, and the summer months tend to be slightly wetter. With a period of record dating only back to 1951, extreme temperatures range from −7 °F (−22 °C) on January 21, 1985, to 104 °F (40 °C) on August 22, 1983, and June 26, 1952.

Climate data for Williamsburg, Virginia (1991–2020 normals, extremes 1951–present)
Month	Jan	Feb	Mar	Apr	May	Jun	Jul	Aug	Sep	Oct	Nov	Dec	Year
Record high °F (°C)	81 (27)	83 (28)	90 (32)	96 (36)	98 (37)	104 (40)	103 (39)	104 (40)	103 (39)	96 (36)	85 (29)	82 (28)	104 (40)
Mean daily maximum °F (°C)	49.1 (9.5)	52.3 (11.3)	59.8 (15.4)	70.0 (21.1)	77.2 (25.1)	84.4 (29.1)	88.5 (31.4)	86.5 (30.3)	80.5 (26.9)	71.0 (21.7)	61.1 (16.2)	52.6 (11.4)	69.4 (20.8)
Daily mean °F (°C)	39.8 (4.3)	42.2 (5.7)	49.1 (9.5)	58.9 (14.9)	67.1 (19.5)	74.9 (23.8)	79.3 (26.3)	77.6 (25.3)	71.8 (22.1)	61.1 (16.2)	51.0 (10.6)	43.4 (6.3)	59.7 (15.4)
Mean daily minimum °F (°C)	30.6 (−0.8)	32.0 (0.0)	38.5 (3.6)	47.7 (8.7)	57.0 (13.9)	65.3 (18.5)	70.2 (21.2)	68.7 (20.4)	63.1 (17.3)	51.3 (10.7)	40.9 (4.9)	34.1 (1.2)	49.9 (9.9)
Record low °F (°C)	−7 (−22)	1 (−17)	10 (−12)	22 (−6)	31 (−1)	37 (3)	48 (9)	44 (7)	38 (3)	21 (−6)	15 (−9)	0 (−18)	−7 (−22)
Average precipitation inches (mm)	3.77 (96)	3.05 (77)	4.25 (108)	3.98 (101)	3.89 (99)	4.16 (106)	5.92 (150)	5.68 (144)	5.40 (137)	4.21 (107)	3.13 (80)	3.80 (97)	51.24 (1,301)
Average snowfall inches (cm)	1.7 (4.3)	1.6 (4.1)	0.2 (0.51)	0.1 (0.25)	0.0 (0.0)	0.0 (0.0)	0.0 (0.0)	0.0 (0.0)	0.0 (0.0)	0.0 (0.0)	0.0 (0.0)	0.7 (1.8)	4.3 (11)
Average precipitation days (≥ 0.01 in)	10.6	9.7	10.6	10.3	11.3	10.7	12.0	10.8	10.2	8.8	9.1	10.6	124.7
Average snowy days (≥ 0.1 in)	0.5	0.6	0.2	0.0	0.0	0.0	0.0	0.0	0.0	0.0	0.0	0.3	1.6
Source: NOAA

== Demographics ==
Historical population
Census	Pop.	Note	%±
1790	1,344		—
1820	1,402		—
1850	877		—
1860	1,113		26.9%
1870	1,392		25.1%
1880	1,480		6.3%
1890	1,831		23.7%
1900	2,044		11.6%
1910	2,714		32.8%
1920	2,462		−9.3%
1930	3,778		53.5%
1940	3,942		4.3%
1950	6,735		70.9%
1960	6,832		1.4%
1970	9,069		32.7%
1980	9,870		8.8%
1990	11,530		16.8%
2000	11,998		4.1%
2010	14,068		17.3%
2020	15,425		9.6%
2025 (est.)	15,861	▲	2.8%
U.S. Decennial Census; 1790-1960 1900-1990; 1990-2000 2010-2020

During the Revolutionary era, African Americans made up over 50% of Williamsburg's population.

=== Racial and ethnic composition ===
Williamsburg city, Virginia – Racial and ethnic composition Note: the US Census treats Hispanic/Latino as an ethnic category. This table excludes Latinos from the racial categories and assigns them to a separate category. Hispanics/Latinos may be of any race.
Race / Ethnicity (NH = Non-Hispanic)	Pop 1980	Pop 1990	Pop 2000	Pop 2010	Pop 2020	% 1980	% 1990	% 2000	% 2010	% 2020
White alone (NH)	8,546	9,272	9,352	9,952	7,370	86.59%	80.42%	77.95%	70.74%	47.78%
Black or African American alone (NH)	1,025	1,739	1,593	1,918	5,648	10.39%	15.08%	13.28%	13.63%	36.62%
Native American or Alaska Native alone (NH)	12	23	31	35	20	0.12%	0.20%	0.26%	0.25%	0.13%
Asian alone (NH)	135	330	546	802	497	1.37%	2.86%	4.55%	5.70%	3.22%
Native Hawaiian or Pacific Islander alone (NH)	x	x	6	4	25	x	x	0.05%	0.03%	0.16%
Other race alone (NH)	46	15	15	23	53	0.47%	0.13%	0.13%	0.16%	0.34%
Mixed race or Multiracial (NH)	x	x	153	393	597	x	x	1.28%	2.79%	3.87%
Hispanic or Latino (any race)	106	151	302	941	1,215	1.07%	1.31%	2.52%	6.69%	7.88%
Total	9,870	11,530	11,998	14,068	15,425	100.00%	100.00%	100.00%	100.00%	100.00%

=== 2020 census ===
As of the 2020 census, Williamsburg had a population of 15,425. The median age was 24.0 years. 9.8% of residents were under the age of 18 and 16.0% of residents were 65 years of age or older. For every 100 females there were 89.0 males, and for every 100 females age 18 and over there were 87.0 males age 18 and over.

99.9% of residents lived in urban areas, while 0.1% lived in rural areas.

There were 5,143 households in Williamsburg, of which 18.4% had children under the age of 18 living in them. Of all households, 35.1% were married-couple households, 23.6% were households with a male householder and no spouse or partner present, and 34.8% were households with a female householder and no spouse or partner present. About 38.0% of all households were made up of individuals and 12.5% had someone living alone who was 65 years of age or older.

There were 5,753 housing units, of which 10.6% were vacant. The homeowner vacancy rate was 2.1% and the rental vacancy rate was 7.8%.

The 2020 census indicated a dramatic demographic shift in the city, reporting that Williamsburg was 49.1% White and 36.9% Black.

Racial composition as of the 2020 census
Race	Number	Percent
White	7,572	49.1%
Black or African American	5,699	36.9%
American Indian and Alaska Native	41	0.3%
Asian	500	3.2%
Native Hawaiian and Other Pacific Islander	25	0.2%
Some other race	596	3.9%
Two or more races	992	6.4%
Hispanic or Latino (of any race)	1,215	7.9%

Census data shows almost all of the Black population growth occurring in Census blocks containing William & Mary dorms, but data from the State Council of Higher Education for Virginia shows no growth in the number of Black students in William & Mary dorms during the 2010s.

University of Virginia researchers believe that the high Black population figure was not due to an actual demographic shift but instead due to "the Bureau's decision to swap some census respondents' identities with other respondents for privacy protection", a phenomenon known as differential privacy.

=== 2010 census ===
Age distribution in Williamsburg

As of the 2010 census, there were 14,068 people, 3,619 households, and 1,787 families residing in the city. The population density was 1,404.1 people per square mile (542.1 people/km^{2}). There were 3,880 housing units at an average density of 454.1 per square mile (175.3/km^{2}). The racial makeup of the city was 74.0% White, 14.0% Black or African American, 0.3% Native American, 5.7% Asian, 0.0% Pacific Islander, 2.5% from other races, and 3.5% from two or more races. 6.7% of the population were Hispanics or Latinos of any race.

There were 3,619 households, out of which 16.5% had children under the age of 18 living with them, 37.2% were married couples living together, 9.6% had a female householder with no husband present, and 50.6% were non-families. 35.9% of all households were made up of individuals, and 11.4% had someone living alone who was 65 years of age or older. The average household size was 2.07 and the average family size was 2.66.

The age distribution was: 9.6% under the age of 18, 46.0% from 18 to 24, 17.7% from 25 to 44, 15.0% from 45 to 64, and 11.7% who were 65 years of age or older. The median age was 23 years. For every 100 females, there were 81.3 males. For every 100 females age 18 and over, there were 80.8 males.

The median income for a household in the city was $37,093, and the median income for a family was $52,358. Males had a median income of $28,625 versus $26,840 for females. The per capita income for the city was $18,483. 18.3% of the population and 9.3% of families were below the poverty line. Out of the total population, 29.7% of those under the age of 18 and 5.5% of those 65 and older were living below the poverty line.

A high proportion of Williamsburg residents derive a significant percentage of their annual income from investments, either in addition to or in lieu of income from work. This is because many retirees relocate to Williamsburg and typically draw income from investments such as 401(k) plans and the like.

== Economy ==
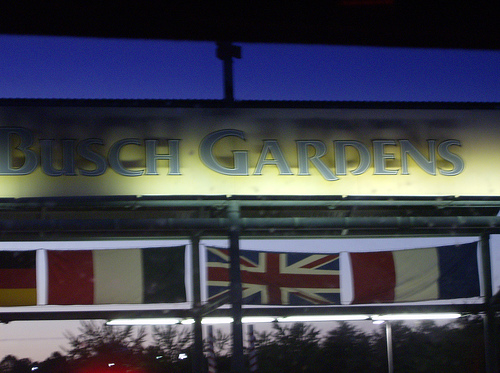
Entrance to Busch Gardens Williamsburg featuring the countries' flags

The tourist volume of Colonial Williamsburg has attracted many related businesses to the area. Notable among these was Anheuser-Busch, which established large operations in James City County and York County just outside the city. The company operates a large brewery there. It also used to operate two theme parks near the brewery, Busch Gardens Williamsburg, and Water Country USA, but both properties were sold to private investors after foreign brewer InBev took over Anheuser-Busch in 2010. Anheuser-Busch also previously operated a commerce park, McLaw's Circle, and Kingsmill on the James, a gated residential neighborhood that contains a resort of the same name.

Williamsburg has an outlet mall, Williamsburg Premium Outlets. A second outlet mall, Williamsburg Outlet Mall, closed in December 2013. Williamsburg Pottery Factory also has outlet stores.

== Arts and culture ==
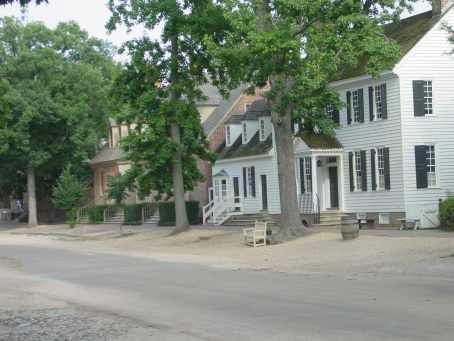
Duke of Gloucester Street in Colonial Williamsburg

Williamsburg is often associated with the larger American South. People who grew up in the Hampton Roads area have a unique Tidewater accent that differs from a stereotypical Southern accent. Vowels have a longer pronunciation than in a regular southern accent. For example, "house" is pronounced "hoose" in the Tidewater accent.

Tourist sites include Colonial Williamsburg, a living history museum depicting the lifestyles and culture of the 18th-century colonial period. Within this area is Virginia's first capitol building, the Governor's Palace, Bruton Parish Church (the oldest continually operating church in the United States), the Peyton Randolph House (home of Peyton Randolph, the first President of Continental Congress) and the College of William & Mary.

Other sites include the Abby Aldrich Rockefeller Folk Art Museum, The Williamsburg Winery, the Williamsburg Botanical Garden, the National Center for State Courts and the Virginia Musical Museum. Williamsburg has two theme parks, Busch Gardens Williamsburg and Water Country USA. Presidents Park was an educational attraction that displayed outdoor statue heads and biographies of 43 presidents. In 2010, Presidents Park closed due to financial issues.

== Government ==
United States presidential election results for Williamsburg, Virginia
Year	Republican		Democratic		Third party(ies)	
Year	No.	%	No.	%	No.	%
1880	108	46.15%	126	53.85%	0	0.00%
1884	177	60.41%	116	39.59%	0	0.00%
1892	120	49.38%	122	50.21%	1	0.41%
1896	90	43.48%	113	54.59%	4	1.93%
1900	88	34.38%	161	62.89%	7	2.73%
1904	37	26.06%	103	72.54%	2	1.41%
1908	48	28.24%	120	70.59%	2	1.18%
1912	11	7.91%	113	81.29%	15	10.79%
1916	21	17.80%	97	82.20%	0	0.00%
1920	62	27.19%	166	72.81%	0	0.00%
1924	31	13.60%	196	85.96%	1	0.44%
1928	98	24.02%	310	75.98%	0	0.00%
1932	99	19.60%	387	76.63%	19	3.76%
1936	96	19.63%	389	79.55%	4	0.82%
1940	168	31.05%	367	67.84%	6	1.11%
1944	211	31.45%	454	67.66%	6	0.89%
1948	334	39.34%	312	36.75%	203	23.91%
1952	797	62.12%	483	37.65%	3	0.23%
1956	775	62.60%	362	29.24%	101	8.16%
1960	721	59.10%	486	39.84%	13	1.07%
1964	906	43.29%	1,171	55.95%	16	0.76%
1968	1,156	46.73%	991	40.06%	327	13.22%
1972	1,786	57.46%	1,274	40.99%	48	1.54%
1976	1,654	51.77%	1,468	45.95%	73	2.28%
1980	1,344	45.51%	1,199	40.60%	410	13.88%
1984	1,913	56.23%	1,469	43.18%	20	0.59%
1988	1,648	50.91%	1,534	47.39%	55	1.70%
1992	1,349	36.27%	1,856	49.91%	514	13.82%
1996	1,560	43.43%	1,820	50.67%	212	5.90%
2000	1,777	47.70%	1,724	46.28%	224	6.01%
2004	2,064	47.78%	2,216	51.30%	40	0.93%
2008	2,353	34.67%	4,328	63.77%	106	1.56%
2012	2,682	34.62%	4,903	63.28%	163	2.10%
2016	1,925	25.24%	5,206	68.27%	495	6.49%
2020	1,963	28.52%	4,790	69.59%	130	1.89%
2024	2,119	26.84%	5,613	71.10%	162	2.05%

Williamsburg is part of Virginia's 1st congressional district, represented by Republican Rob Wittman, who was first elected in 2007. He will be replaced by Democrat Shannon Taylor in the 120th Congress, after her victory in 2026.

When Williamsburg received its charter in 1722, it had portions in both James City and York County. In 1870, the Virginia General Assembly changed the boundaries so that it was entirely within James City County.

A year later, a new state constitution created the political entity known as an independent city, which is not located in any county. Williamsburg subsequently incorporated as a city in 1884 and separated from James City County, but continues to share several constitutional officers with James City County. The city also operates a joint school division with James City County, under a voluntary agreement that leaders revisit at planned intervals.

As an independent city, Williamsburg has had a council-manager form of government since 1932. The city council elects the mayor, who presides over council meetings and serves as the city's Chief Elected Official. The city council consists of five members who serve staggered, four-year terms. It hires a city manager, comparable to a corporation's chief executive officer, who is usually a professionally trained public administrator and is charged with implementing the council's policies and directives and has broad administrative authority with strict rules prohibiting political interference in administrative matters.

As of 2020, Williamsburg's mayor is Douglas Pons, and the vice mayor is W. Pat Dent. Other city council members are Barbara Ramsey, Ted Maslin and Caleb Rogers. The city manager is Andrew O. Trivette.

The city now shares all constitutional officers, courts, and the Williamsburg-James City County Public Schools system (WJCC) with adjacent James City County, and is the county seat. Until 1998, the city had its own Sheriff's Office. It was consolidated with the James City County Sheriff's Office, becoming Williamsburg-James City County Sheriff's Office.

As a college town, Williamsburg's large student population has also resulted in a few conflicts with the city government. For example, in addressing concerns of property values and noise complaints near campus, the council has undertaken initiatives to reduce student off-campus residential presence in the city by instituting a maximum occupancy rule of three unrelated persons for single-family dwellings, as well as a plan to buy rental houses with taxpayer dollars and resell them with the stipulation that the new owners must occupy them. Until July 1, 2007, the voting registrar, David Andrews, had interpreted Virginia law to exclude a high percentage of students, arguing that students should be registered where their parents live. The new voter registrar, Win Sowder, said she is registering students as she would "any other resident of the city. If they're living in the dorms for eight months out of the year, and have an address located within the city limits on a Virginia driver's license, they're entitled to register to vote." In presidential elections, Williamsburg was a Republican-leaning city for most of the time from the 1950s to the 1980s. Between 1948 and 1988, it supported a Democratic presidential nominee only once, in Lyndon Johnson's 1964 landslide victory over Republican Barry Goldwater. This changed in the 1990s when Democrat Bill Clinton won Williamsburg in both of his presidential campaigns. Due in part to Green Party candidate Ralph Nader's strong showing as a left-wing protest candidate in the college town, Republican George W. Bush secured a very narrow plurality in 2000.

Democrat John Kerry won the city by a single-digit margin over Bush in 2004. In the elections since then, Williamsburg has swung heavily to the Democrats, and has become one of the most Democratic areas of Hampton Roads and Virginia. Democrat Barack Obama swept Williamsburg by 29-point margins in both the 2008 and 2012 elections. In the 2016 election, Democrat Hillary Clinton beat Republican Donald Trump in Williamsburg by 45 points. Trump won 25% of the vote, the worst showing for a Republican in the city in over a century. Joe Biden carried the city with nearly 70% of the vote in 2020. Kamala Harris won over 71% of the vote in 2024.

== Education ==
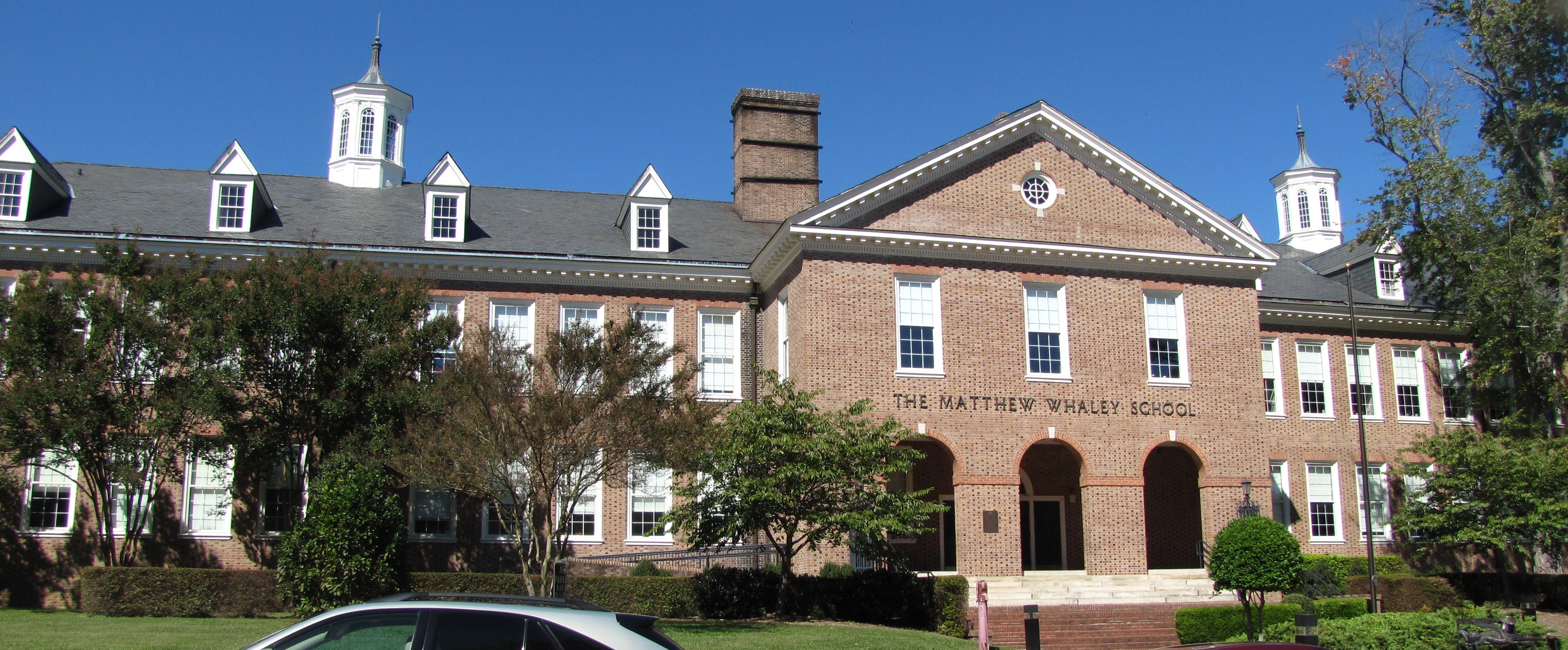
Matthew Whaley School, the sole public elementary school in Williamsburg

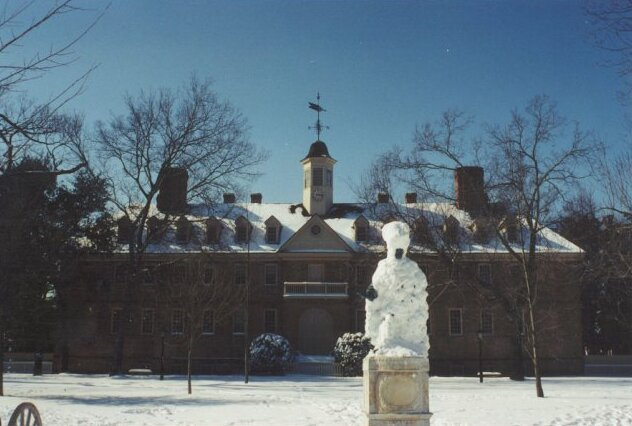
The Wren Building on the campus of The College of William & Mary

The Williamsburg-James City County Public Schools operates the following schools in Williamsburg: Matthew Whaley School, Berkeley Middle School, James Blair Middle School, Lafayette High School, and Warhill High School.

There are several private schools that also serve the Williamsburg and James City Country area, including Williamsburg Christian Academy, a Christian International Baccalaureate School, Walsingham Academy, a private Catholic school serving pre-kindergarten through 12th grade, Williamsburg Montessori School, and Providence Classical School.

The city has been the home to the College of William & Mary since its founding in 1693, making it America's second-oldest college (after Harvard University). Technically a university, William & Mary was also the first U.S. institution to have a Royal Charter, and the only one to have coat-of-arms from the College of Arms in London. The campus adjoins the Historic District, and the Wren Building at the head of Duke of Gloucester Street was one of the earliest restored by W. A. R. Goodwin and the family of John D. Rockefeller Jr. as they began creating Colonial Williamsburg. Over 70% of the college's students either work part-time or volunteer in the community. Students contribute over 300,000 hours of volunteer service to Williamsburg annually.

== Media ==
Williamsburg is primarily served by two newspapers, The Virginia Gazette and Williamsburg-Yorktown Daily.

The Gazette is a biweekly, published in Williamsburg, and was the first newspaper to be published south of the Potomac River, starting in 1736. Its publisher was William Parks, who had similar ventures in Maryland. After his death in 1750, Parks's shop foreman William Hunter restarted the paper in 1751.

The Daily Press, published in nearby Newport News, covers local, regional, and national news. The College of William & Mary has two student newspapers, the student-fee-supported campus newspaper The Flat Hat and the independent campus newspaper The Virginia Informer. William & Mary students produce many other publications and run their own radio station, WCWM. Hampton Roads Magazine is a bimonthly regional magazine for Williamsburg and the Hampton Roads area. Williamsburg is served by a variety of AM and FM radio stations, including WTYD, WBQK, and WMBG.

Williamsburg is served by the Norfolk–Portsmouth–Newport News designated market area (DMA), the nation's 42nd-largest, with 712,790 homes (0.64% of the total U.S.).

== Infrastructure ==
=== Transportation ===
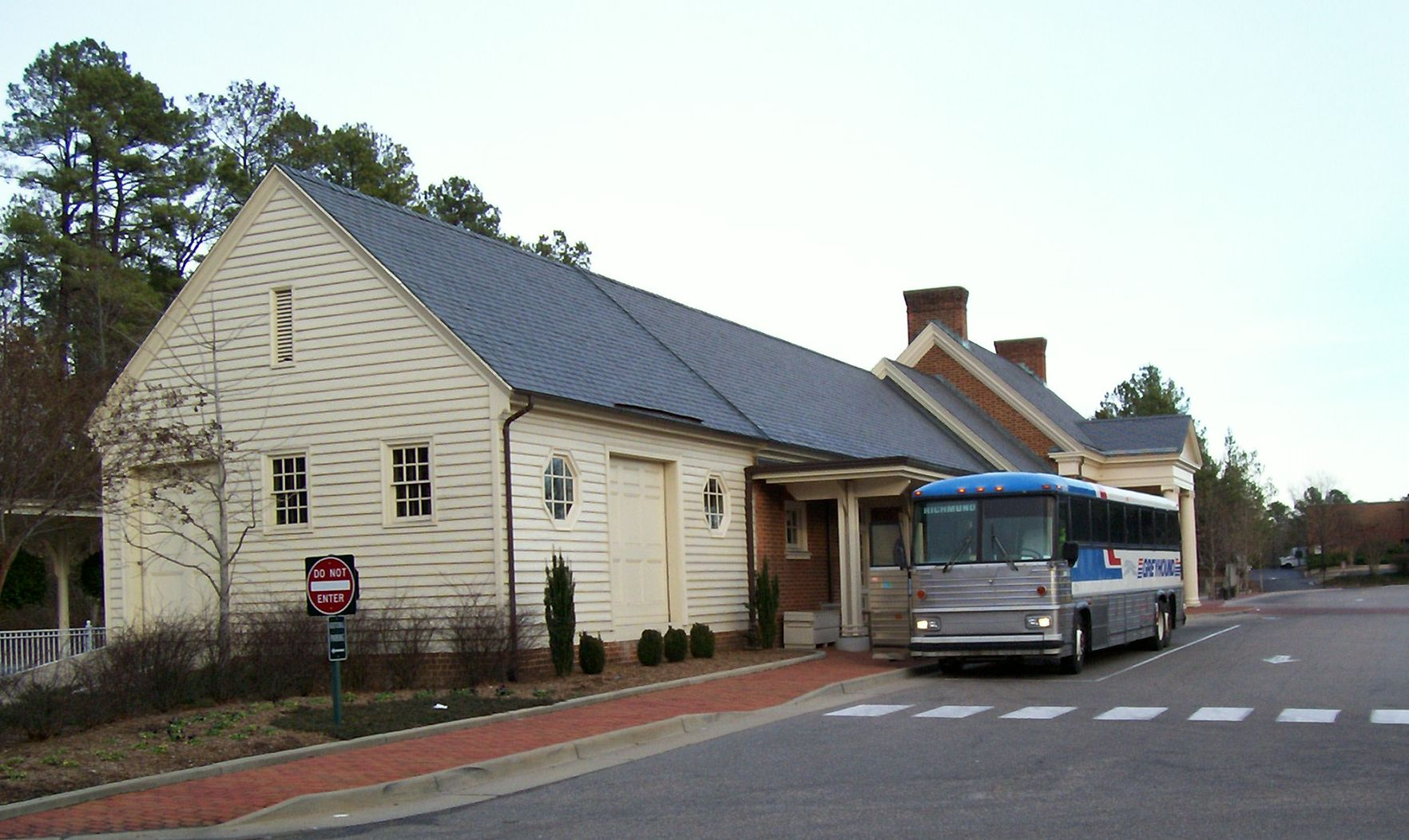
Greyhound's bus loading at Williamsburg Transportation Center

Williamsburg is located adjacent to Interstate 64 and U.S. Route 60, which connect the city with Richmond to the northwest and Norfolk to the southeast. State Route 199, officially named the Humelsine Parkway after a former Colonial Williamsburg president, surrounds the city in a semicircle. State Route 5 links the city with the James River Plantations along the north shore of the James River, Interstate 295 and Richmond. State Route 31 provides a route to Jamestown and the toll-free Jamestown Ferry. The Colonial Parkway provides a bucolic low-speed link to Jamestown and Yorktown, passing under Colonial Williamsburg in a tunnel. With the exception of buses, commercial vehicles are not allowed on the Parkway.

The community's public bus system, Williamsburg Area Transit Authority (WATA), has its central hub at the transportation center. A network of disabled-accessible transit bus routes serve the city, James City County, and most portions of York County adjacent to the Williamsburg area, with hourly service seven days a week, and half-hourly service on select routes during peak weekday hours. The routes operated by WATA include a loop around the William & Mary campus while classes are in session. The system also provides paratransit services and operates replica trolley buses at the Yorktown Riverfront attraction. WATA connects with the much larger Hampton Roads Transit (HRT) bus system at Lee Hall in northwestern Newport News and at the Williamsburg Transportation Center.

Walking is a major mode of transportation in Williamsburg, with approximately one-fifth of people walking to work between 2006 and 2010. Walk Score, a website which algorithmically determines how friendly communities are to walkers, describes the city as "very walkable". With few exceptions, motorized traffic is not allowed on Duke of Gloucester Street, which passes through Colonial Williamsburg and the shopping district of Merchant's Square.

The city is also increasingly bicycle-friendly, having built 48 miles of bicycle facilities in the area since 1992. The Virginia Capital Trail additionally provides paved off-road path to Richmond for bicyclists and pedestrians via the Colonial Parkway.

The primary airport for the Virginia Peninsula is the Newport News/Williamsburg International Airport in Newport News, a twenty-minute drive from Williamsburg. Norfolk International Airport and Richmond International Airport also serve passengers from the city. Amtrak serves Williamsburg with three trains a day stopping at the Amtrak Station. The line runs west along the Virginia Peninsula to Richmond and points beyond. A high-speed rail connection at Richmond to both the Northeast Corridor and the Southeast High Speed Rail Corridor are also under study.

Intercity bus services are provided by Greyhound and the Virginia Breeze. The latter added service to Williamsburg on April 20, 2026, stopping at the Williamsburg Transportation Center. The added service, known as the Tidewater Current, connects to Virginia Beach, Norfolk, Newport News, Richmond and Richmond International Airport, Charlottesville, and Staunton.

=== Utilities ===
Waller Mill Reservoir is the main water source for Williamsburg. A 350-acre lake holding 1.5 billion gallons of water, it has been in operation since 1945. The City owns a large percentage of the surrounding watershed. During drought, this source may be supplemented by groundwater from a well at Waller Mill and from raw (untreated) water from Newport News Waterworks under a long-term agreement.

The City provides wastewater services for residents and transports wastewater to the regional Hampton Roads Sanitation District treatment plants.

== Notable people ==
- John Amson (1698–1765) – English physician, alderman, and mayor of Williamsburg
- Brent Ashabranner (1921–2016) – Peace Corps administrator and author
- Matt Behncke (b. 1990) – soccer player
- David Berman (1967–2019) – singer-songwriter, poet, and founder of Silver Jews
- John Blair Jr. (1732–1800) – Founding Father and Supreme Court justice
- Lemuel J. Bowden (1815–1864) – senator for Virginia
- Al Clark (b. 1948) – baseball umpire for American League and Major League Baseball
- Richard Coke (1829–1897) – governor and senator for Texas
- Octavius Coke (1840–1895) – Secretary of State of North Carolina
- Jimmy Fortune (b. 1955) – singer for The Statler Brothers
- Bruce Hornsby (b. 1954) – singer and pianist
- Keith Hornsby (b. 1992) – basketball player
- Edward Darlington Jones (1885–1954), United States Coast Guard Rear Admiral
- John Nicholas (1764–1819) – representative for Virginia and member of the New York Senate
- Robert C. Nicholas (1801–1854) – member of the New York Senate
- Robert Carter Nicholas Sr. (1728/29–1780) – Supreme Court of Virginia justice
- Wilson Cary Nicholas (1761–1820) – governor, senator, and representative of Virginia
- Edmund Randolph (1753–1813) – Founding Father, Attorney General, and Secretary of State
- Carolynn Reid-Wallace (b. 1942) – president of Fisk University
- Harry P. Storke (1905–1985) – US Army lieutenant general
- Lawrence Taylor (b. 1959) – National Football League (NFL) player
- Georgia O'Keeffe (1887–1986) – painter and draftswoman
- Canaan Smith (b. 1982) – singer-songwriter
- John Tayloe II (1721–1779) – builder of the Mount Airy Plantation and member of the Virginia Governor's Council

== See also ==
- Colonial Williamsburg
- Hampton Roads
- National Register of Historic Places listings in Williamsburg, Virginia
- Williamsburg Winery
- Wren Building
- Virginia Peninsula
- Tayloe House (Williamsburg, Virginia)
- Williamsburg Charter
