= Williamsburg Outlet Mall =

Coordinates: 37°20′20″N 76°45′22″W

Williamsburg Outlet Mall, originally Outlets Ltd., was a 250,000-square-foot (23,000 m^{2}) outlet shopping complex located in Williamsburg, Virginia. The shopping center had 40 stores. It opened in 1983.

After years of declining traffic, the mall closed in late 2013. Then most stores moved to Williamsburg Premium Outlets. A plan was made to replace it with a marketplace. Demolition started in 2014. The developer, a consortium of Vistacor, LLC and Armada Hoffler Properties, Inc., built a 131,000 square foot marketplace anchored by Harris Teeter and Walgreens. The project opened in 2016 and it cost $25 million.
