= Williamsburg Winery =

Winery located in Williamsburg, Virginia

Coordinates: 37.232069°N 76.718423°W

- Location: Williamsburg, Virginia
- Founded: c. 1985
- Varietal: Viognier, Vidal blanc, Cabernet Franc
- Distribution: Virginia, Maryland, DC, North Carolina, New York, UK and Belgium
- Tasting: Open daily to the Public with tastings every half hour
- Website: http://www.WilliamsburgWinery.com

The Williamsburg Winery is a winery located in Williamsburg, Virginia. It is the state's largest winery, accounting for one quarter of all wine produced in Virginia.

== History ==
The Williamsburg Winery took its present form for the first time in 1985, when Patrick and Margaret Duffeler bought a 320-acre (1.3 km^{2}) parcel of land which they called "Wessex Hundred". The property is located near "Jockey's Neck", near Archer's Hope, an area of early colonial significance, and was used as early as 1619 for planting grapes. The Duffelers began planting vines immediately, and the first harvest was taken in 1987. The first wine was released in 1988, and was called "Governor's White". This wine remains the winery's most popular. The Williamsburg Winery produces approximately 65,000 cases of wine annually.

== Vineyards ==
The Williamsburg winery is located on a 320-acre plot of land known as the Wessex Hundred. Of the 320 acres of land owned by the winery, 275 acres are dedicated to the Williamsburg Conservancy and are intended to remain permanently undeveloped. In keeping with the conservation theme, Patrick Duffeler and the Virginia Forestry Service planted 50,000 lob lolly pine trees along the James River to replace wood originally used when building the winery. As of 2010, the vineyard contains nearly 50 acres of cultivated land. An additional 2 acres of land have been developed into a sustainable garden which is used to provide produce to the Winery's on-site dining establishments.

== Grapes ==
The list of grapes harvested includes:

- Petit Verdot
- Traminette
- Merlot
- Vidal blanc
- Viognier
- Cabernet Franc
- Albarino
- Chardonnay
- Tannat
