= Trinity Forum =

American faith-based non-profit Christian organization

- Formation: 1991
- Type: Non-Profit
- Headquarters: 1015 18th St, NW Ste 201
- Location: Washington, D.C.
- President: Cherie Harder
- Website: www.TTF.org

The Trinity Forum (TTF) is an American faith-based non-profit Christian organization founded in 1991 by author and social critic Os Guinness and American businessman and philanthropist Alonzo L. McDonald.

The current president of the Trinity Forum is Cherie Harder. The Trinity Forum is a member of the Evangelical Council for Financial Accountability.
