= List of publications at the College of William & Mary =

This is a list of past and present publications at the College of William & Mary. Many of them, such as The Flat Hat, are funded through the College's student activities fees. Some, however, such as The Virginia Informer, are privately funded.

The oldest extant student news sheet from the College of William & Mary is The Owl, an unofficial publication with a strong Southern political slant from 1854. The only known copy is held by the Special Collections Research Center (SCRC) in Earl Gregg Swem Library. Student publications in a variety of formats are actively collected by the SCRC.

Overseeing all school-funded publications is the Publications Council.

== Newspapers and informational magazines ==
Name	Began	Ended	Notes	Reference	Link
The Advocate	1969	2009			
Alembic	1968	1969	An underground newspaper.		—
The Brave Indian	1947	1947	Information unavailable		—
College Observer	1970	1971	A supplement published by the Virginia Gazette specifically covering College news. Many of the writers and production people were students. The paper appeared weekly during the school year from September 1970 through December 1971.		—
Cumtux	1948	1948	A short-lived newspaper.		—
The DoG Street Journal	2003	still active	An online newspaper and monthly news magazine at William & Mary. Magazines are issued once a month and online stories appear irregularly during the academic year.		
The Green and Gold Dispatch	2013	still active			
The Flat Hat	1911	Still active	The oldest campus newspaper at William & Mary. In October 2007, it won the Pacemaker award for excellence in the category of non-daily newspaper at a four-year university, and in 2010 was listed by College Media Matters as one of the 30 best collegiate newspapers in the United States. The Flat Hat now prints twice weekly, but up until the spring of 2007 it used to only print once weekly. It is funded partially through the Publications Council, a body composed of college administrators and the editors of other campus publications. The Flat Hat maintains editorial and procedural autonomy from the College.		
Gladfly	2015	Still active	The Gadfly is an independent leftist publication at the College of William & Mary.		—
Hatter	1970	1970	Also called Strike! Two issues were printed in the spring semester.		—
The High Hat	1930	1961	The student newspaper of the Norfolk Division of The College of William & Mary (which has since become Old Dominion University).		—
The Remnant	1989	2005	A weekly journal of student opinion.		—
Rip-off	1974	1974	Possibly only one issue of this newspaper. Their slogan was, "All the news that fits, we print."		—
Spirit of the Living Watching	2012	still active	An art and art history publication interested in both scholarly and creative responses to art as well as opportunities available to students on campus.		—
The Straw Hat	1914	1933	A summer school newspaper originally published in Dublin, Virginia. Later issues began to get printed on the College campus.		—
The Virginia Informer	2005	2012	The College's second largest student newspaper and printed monthly. It was one of the only newspaper at the College that was independently funded. The Informer was officially non-partisan but known to challenge the campus establishment and have conservative and libertarian editorials.		
W&M Standard	2001	2006	A conservative independent publication of The Standard.		—
The William and Mary Excalibur	1970	1970	Information unavailable		—
The William and Mary Observer	1986	1987	A journal of student opinion and investigative reporting. Only three issues were ever produced.		—
William and Mary Perspective	1987	1989	Information unavailable		—
The Williamsburg Daily Planet	1975	1975	A one-issue newspaper.		—

== Literary and art ==
Name	Began	Ended	Notes	Reference	Link
Vinyl Tap	2016	Still active	Premiere music and art publication at The College of William and Mary. Revived in 2016.		
The Gallery	1979	Still active	Formerly The Gallery of Writing; a poetry and literature publication.		
The Gargoyle	1973	1973	A one-issue journal of literature and the fine arts.		—
Jump!	1983	-	A news–feature magazine.		
The Logos	2007	Still active	A literary magazine.		—
Manqué	2004	2004	Slogan was "the presence of absence." It had been previously published in an online edition only.		—
Rocket	2010	2023	Rocket Magazine is the premiere art and fashion publication at The College of William and Mary. Founded by Justin Miller in 2011, the purpose of Rocket is to provide an outlet for student artistic expression primarily through art and design, fashion, photography, and feature.		
William and Mary Review	1962	Still active	Formed by union of the Royalist (1937–1962) and Seminar (1956–1962).		—
William & Mary Comix	2007	2009	A publication with small print volumes containing artwork and comics created by students at the College.		
Winged Nation	1993	Still active	Winged Nation is a literary arts magazine publishing only student work which "seeks to showcase students' unique view of the world through art, literature, and design."		

== Humor and satire ==
Name	Began	Ended	Notes	Reference	Link
Ha!	1994	1994	Information unavailable		—
The Owl	1854	1854	One of the earliest recorded examples of satirical literature at the College. The premier issue is the only remaining copy in Swem Archives. It debuted during the height of the antebellum period with the country torn over the issue of states rights and slavery. The Owl addresses many issues that would be considered controversial today, such as race and gender. Other issues addressed that are still present were professors, administration, and Williamsburg citizens. There is no evidence of funding found for The Owl. A theory on this is that The Owl was merely a joke amongst a group of students and they used their own money to pay to have it printed. Also there is no evidence to prove that multiple copies were produced and distributed.		—
The Pillory	1991	2013	A satire magazine and only publishes one issue per semester. The magazine does not have any competitors per se, as it is not a news reporting magazine. It is well-known on the College of William & Mary's campus, however, that The Pillory and The Virginia Informer generally dislike one another.		—
Sleuth	2000	2000	Two issue satirical magazine for the months of October and November. It was in a newsletter format – one long sheet with several humorous stories. Sleuth contained only one small advertisement per issue, located in the bottom right-hand corner. They provided coupons for the campus coffee house The Daily Grind and Williamsburg pub The Green Leafe, two popular student hangouts.		—
The Taverner	1987	1988	A bound pamphlet, was composed of humor articles and stories within each issue. It never tried to mock real newspapers, thus making it a "soft news" publication.		—
The Botetourt Squat	2011	Still Active	A satirical newspaper that mocks and provides humorous insight into campus culture. Named for the Botetourt Complex, infamous Freshmen dorms on New Campus. The newspaper does not currently have any competitors, though it occasionally jokingly derides The Flat Hat on principle.		—
Ramble On	2019	Still Active	A comedy-centered arts and culture magazine that provides humorous reviews of films, television, music, literature, etc. as well as opinion pieces. It is made by the same people that provide William & Mary Television content.		

== Special interest ==
Name	Began	Ended	Notes	Reference	Link
Calling Out	2006	2006	Publication of the Asian Student Council.		—
Colonial Echo	1899	Still active	The yearbook of the College of William & Mary, created entirely by students. The yearbook has been published every year since its first issue. Issues are published during homecoming weekend of the following academic year and distributed to students without additional charge.		
From the Margin	2005	2006	A discourse on minority experience.		—
Iskra	1967	1968	An alternative title was Spark. Presumably named after Iskra.		—
Lips: Expressions of Female Sexuality	2007	Still active	A 'zine that was created by four students as a Women's Studies project in the spring of 2007. The purpose of Lips is to provide a space for open and honest expressions of sexuality from the female perspective. Entries include poetry, prose, essays, short stories, artwork, and magazine clippings. Lips is released once a semester.		—
Namet and Taket	1945	1945	Weekly volume designations during July and August 1945.		—
The Progressive	2004	2006	A liberal, leftist, and/or progressive magazine, alternatively known as the William & Mary Progressive.		
Uhuru	1976	1976	One issue (?). Other information unavailable.		—
Underground	2018	still active	Underground focuses on sharing the experiences of the marginalized with William & Mary. Its content expresses the issues of the students, faculty, and staff at the College, including but not limited to members of the Latinx, Black, Asian and Pacific Islander, Native American, Middle Eastern, LGBTQ+, Disabled, and Neurodiverse communities.		
William and Mary Alumni Magazine	?	Still active	The official magazine for all alumni of the College. It is mailed quarterly – once during each new season. It updates the alumni on happenings at William & Mary as well as future events and plans. In the back of the magazine it lists notable achievements by certain alumni per each graduating year, as well as any alumni deaths that have occurred since the previous issue.		

== Discipline-specific ==
Name	Began	Ended	Notes	Reference	Link
Journal of Online Law	1995	2001	Created by the William & Mary Law School, it was an electronic publication of scholarly essays about law and online communications.		—
The Monitor	1993	Still active	The journal of international studies at the College of William & Mary. The purpose of The Monitor is to publish undergraduate papers from a broad range of academic disciplines including, but not limited to: religion, history, sociology, anthropology, government, linguistics, international studies, international relations, and modern languages.		
William and Mary Environmental Law and Policy Review	1975	Still active	Began as the William and Mary Journal of Environmental Law in 1975 to report on local and regional topics of environmental law. Today, the central function of the review is to provide a forum for professors, scholars, practitioners and students to publish articles on current topics of environmental law and examine in a more focused manner the policy implications behind the law.		
William and Mary Law Review	1957	Still active	Published entirely by William and Mary law students, it is an annual volume of legal writing containing both professional and student work.		
The James Blair Historical Review		still active	Student-run peer-reviewed history journal dedicated to undergraduate research.		
William & Mary Economic Review	2024	Still active	Student-run peer-reviewed economic journal dedicated to undergraduate research.		
Gazeta	2005	Still active	Student-led Russian Department journal that is committed to publicizing work capturing Eastern European culture, relevant current events, original poetry, recipes, and other miscellaneous topics.		

== Miscellaneous ==
Name	Began	Ended	Notes	Reference	Link
Eighteenth-Century Life	?	?	Information unavailable.		—
Ideation	2005	Still active	A semi-annual magazine "to showcase the research and scholarship contributions to society being made by faculty and students of the College." The magazine is mailed out to all alumni of William & Mary to further promote conducting research at the school.		
The Throne	2002	Still active	A monthly newsletter created by the staff of Swem Library that is posted inside the library's bathroom stalls. The idea for The Throne was borrowed from "Stall Talk" of the University of Virginia libraries.		—
William & Mary News	?	Still active	It's published by the Office of University Relations as a service to the greater College community. It updates the College community on the administration's, faculty's, students' and staff's achievements.		
William and Mary Quarterly	1892	Still active	This history journal was founded at the College of William & Mary in 1892. Since 1944 it has been published by the Omohundro Institute of Early American History and Culture established by the College and the Colonial Williamsburg Foundation.		
