= College Creek =

Stream in Virginia, United States

Coordinates: 37°13′23″N 76°41′38″W

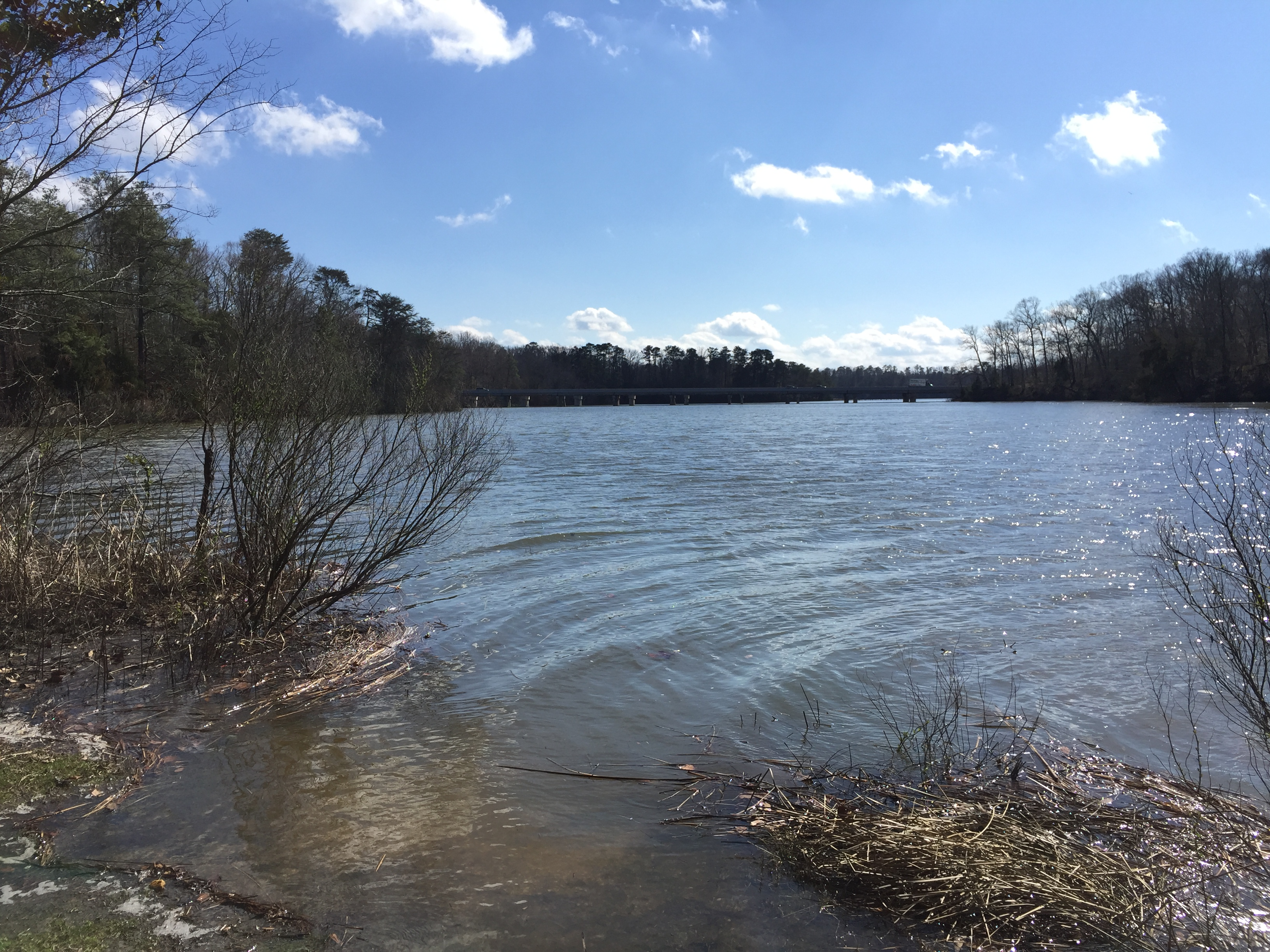
College Creek, as seen from the College Landing Archeological Site. A bridge over the Humelsine Parkway is barely visible in the trees.

College Creek (formerly named Archer's Hope Creek) is located in James City County in the Virginia Peninsula area of the Hampton Roads region of southeastern Virginia in the United States. From a point of origin near the independent city of Williamsburg, it is a tributary of the James River.

== Description ==
The College Creek watershed of James City County includes the residential subdivisions of Kingsmill, Kingspoint, James Terrace, and the Vineyards. The watershed also contains Kingsmill Pond, Busch Corporate Center and the Anheuser-Busch Brewery.

== History ==
=== Seventeenth Century ===
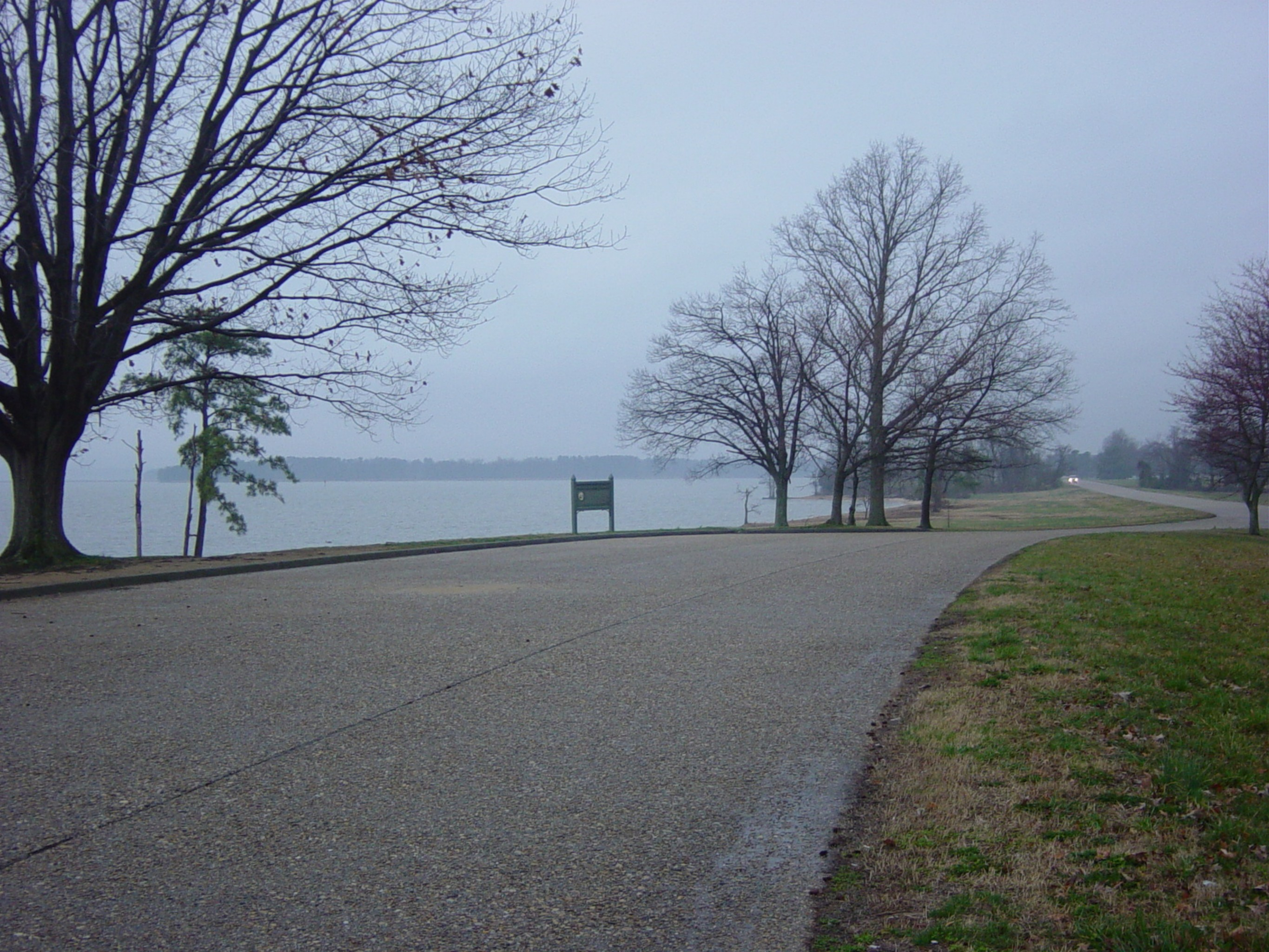
Archers Hope (College Creek) with historical marker

As Jamestown in the Colony of Virginia was first settled by English colonists beginning in 1607, a nearby tributary of the James River was named Archer's Hope Creek. It took its name from a point of land near the mouth named Archer's Hope after Gabriel Archer. Captain Archer was particularly impressed with this location and urged that it be the point of settlement. The soil seemed good, timber and wildlife were abundant, and it appeared adaptable for defensive measures if these should become necessary. It was not possible, however, to bring the ships close to the shore, and consequently Archer's Hope was rejected. From this site the ships moved directly to Jamestown, where they arrived May 13. The present-day National Park Service's Colonial Parkway has a scenic turnout at Archer's Hope. Archer's Hope Creek drained the southern half of the nearby section of the Virginia Peninsula, with a watershed extending to a high point ridge near the center.

The idea of a palisade or fortification across the peninsula was discussed as early as 1611. But, during the era of the marriage of colonist John Rolfe and Pocahontas, daughter of the Powhatan chief, who were wed in 1614, there was a period of peaceful relations with the Natives, and nothing was immediately done in furtherance of the suggestion. The idea of building a palisade was renewed around 1623, following the Indian massacre of 1622. At that time, of the settlers in Martin's Hundred at Wolstenholme Towne, situated on the James about 6 miles (9.7 km) below Jamestown, seventy-three were slain, and the survivors were so alarmed and weakened that the settlement was temporarily abandoned. Governor Francis Wyatt and his Council wrote to the Earl of Southampton that they had under consideration a plan of "winning the forest" by running a pale between the James and York.

Dr. John Potts blazed the way by obtaining on July 12, 1632, a patent for 1,200 acres (4.9 km^{2}) at the head of Archer's Hope Creek, midway between the James River at Archer's Hope and the former Native American village of Chiskiack near the York River. On September 4, 1632, the General Assembly directed that the encouragement of land offered two years before to inhabitants at Chiskiack, should also be granted to all persons settling between Queen's Creek and Archer's Hope Creek.

In February, 1633, it was enacted that a fortieth part of the men in "the compasse of the forest" east of Archer's Hope and Queen's Creek to Chesapeake Bay (essentially all of the lower peninsula) should be present "before the first day of March next" at Dr. John Potts' plantation, "newlie built," to erect houses and secure the land in that quarter. Work on the palisade commenced by March 1, 1633.

With this labor, palisades, six miles (9.7 km) in length, were run from creek to creek, as the palisade continued to reach Queen's Creek, which drained the northern half of the nearby section of the Peninsula, with a watershed leading to the York River. The two creeks and the palisade in between created a barrier from river to river. At the high ridge at the midpoint, a settlement to be called Middle Plantation was made.

By 1634, the palisade (or stockade) was completed, providing some security from attacks by the Native Americans for colonists farming and fishing lower on the Peninsula from that point. Anchored at its center by Middle Plantation, the palisade is partially described in the following extract from a letter written in 1634, from Jamestown, by Captain Thomas Yonge:

"a strong palisade ... upon a streight between both rivers and ... a sufficient force of men to defence of the same, whereby all the lower part of Virginia have a range for their cattle, near fortie miles in length and in most places twelve miles (19 km) broade. The pallisades is very neare six miles (10 km) long, bounded in by two large Creekes. ... in this manner to take also in all the grounde between those two Rivers, and so utterly excluded the Indians from thence; which work is conceived to be of extraordinary benefit to the country ..."

After 1644, the Native Americans of the Powhatan Confederacy had been overcome and were no longer a threat, and the palisade fell into disrepair, with almost all traces eventually disappearing. However, Middle Plantation began to grow as a settlement, largely due to early efforts of the Ludwell brothers and Colonel John Page and his sons, who built fine brick homes and helped with the establishment of a fine brick Bruton Parish Church. The 1690s saw a quick rise to prominence as Reverend Dr. James Blair, Commissary of the Bishop of London in the colony, returned from a successful trip to London and a royal charter for the new College of William & Mary. Blair and the trustees of the College of William & Mary bought a parcel of 330 acres (1.3 km^{2}) from Thomas Ballard, the proprietor of Rich Neck Plantation, for the new school, on the western outskirts of Middle Plantation, just a short distance from the almost new brick Bruton Parish Church, a focal point of the extant community.

The new school opened in temporary buildings in 1694. Properly called the "College Building," the first version of the Wren Building was built at Middle Plantation beginning on August 8, 1695, and occupied by 1700 on a picturesque site. (The present-day College still stands upon those grounds, adjacent to and just west of the restored historic area known in modern times as Colonial Williamsburg).

After the statehouse at Jamestown burned in 1698, the legislature moved temporarily to Middle Plantation, as it had in the past. Upon suggestion of students of the college, the capital was permanently relocated there, and Middle Plantation was renamed Williamsburg in 1699. Nearby, Archer's Hope Creek was also renamed. It became College Creek.

=== Nineteenth Century ===
In the mid-19th century, during the American Civil War, College Creek again served as part of another cross-peninsula defensive barrier, although the center section across land was located further east, and was of a different nature. College Creek became the southern anchor of the Williamsburg Line. This was a series of 14 redoubts east of town, with earthen Fort Magruder (also known as Redoubt # 6) at the crucial junction of the two major roads leading to Williamsburg from the east. The design and construction had been oversee by the College of William & Mary's President Benjamin S. Ewell, who owned a farm in James City County, and had been commissioned as an officer in the Confederate Army after the college closed for the duration of the War in June, 1861.

The Williamsburg area saw combat in the spring of 1862 during the Peninsula Campaign, an effort to take Richmond from the east from a base at Fort Monroe. Throughout late 1861 and early 1862, the small contingent of Confederate defenders was known as the Army of the Peninsula, and led by popular General John B. Magruder. He successfully used ruse tactics to bluff the invaders as to the size and strength of his forces, and intimidated them into a slow movement up the Peninsula, gaining valuable time defenses to be constructed for the Confederate capital at Richmond.

In early May, 1862, after holding the Union troops off for over a month, the defenders withdrew quietly from the Warwick Line (stretching across the Peninsula between Yorktown and Mulberry Island). As General George McClellan's Union forces crept up the Peninsula to pursue the retreating Confederate forces, a rear guard force led by General James Longstreet and supported by General J.E.B. Stuart's cavalry blocked their westward progression at the Williamsburg Line.

At the Battle of Williamsburg on May 5, 1862, and the next day, May 6, the city fell to the Union. However, the retreating defenders behind the Williamsburg Line had been successful in delaying the Union forces long enough for the retreating Confederates to reach the outer defenses of Richmond safely. A siege of Richmond resulted, culminating in the Seven Days Battles, and McClellan's campaign failed. As a result, the War dragged on almost 3 more years at great cost to lives and finances for both sides before its conclusion in April 1865. Much damage was done to the community during the Union occupation, which lasted until September 1865.

=== Twentieth century to present ===
In the early 1957, College Creek was bridged near its mouth by the new Colonial Parkway which was rushed to completion for the celebration of the 350th anniversary of the establishment of Jamestown, Virginia. The Williamsburg Airport was established in James City County near the western shore and the border with Williamsburg.

In 1985, "Wessex Hundred" was founded for the Williamsburg Winery near the creek.

In more recent times, four-laned limited access State Route 199, also known as the Humelsine Parkway, runs along the county-city border as it crosses College Creek on two large bridges, the more recent completed in 2006.

== See also ==
- List of rivers of Virginia
