= Os Guinness =

English author and social critic

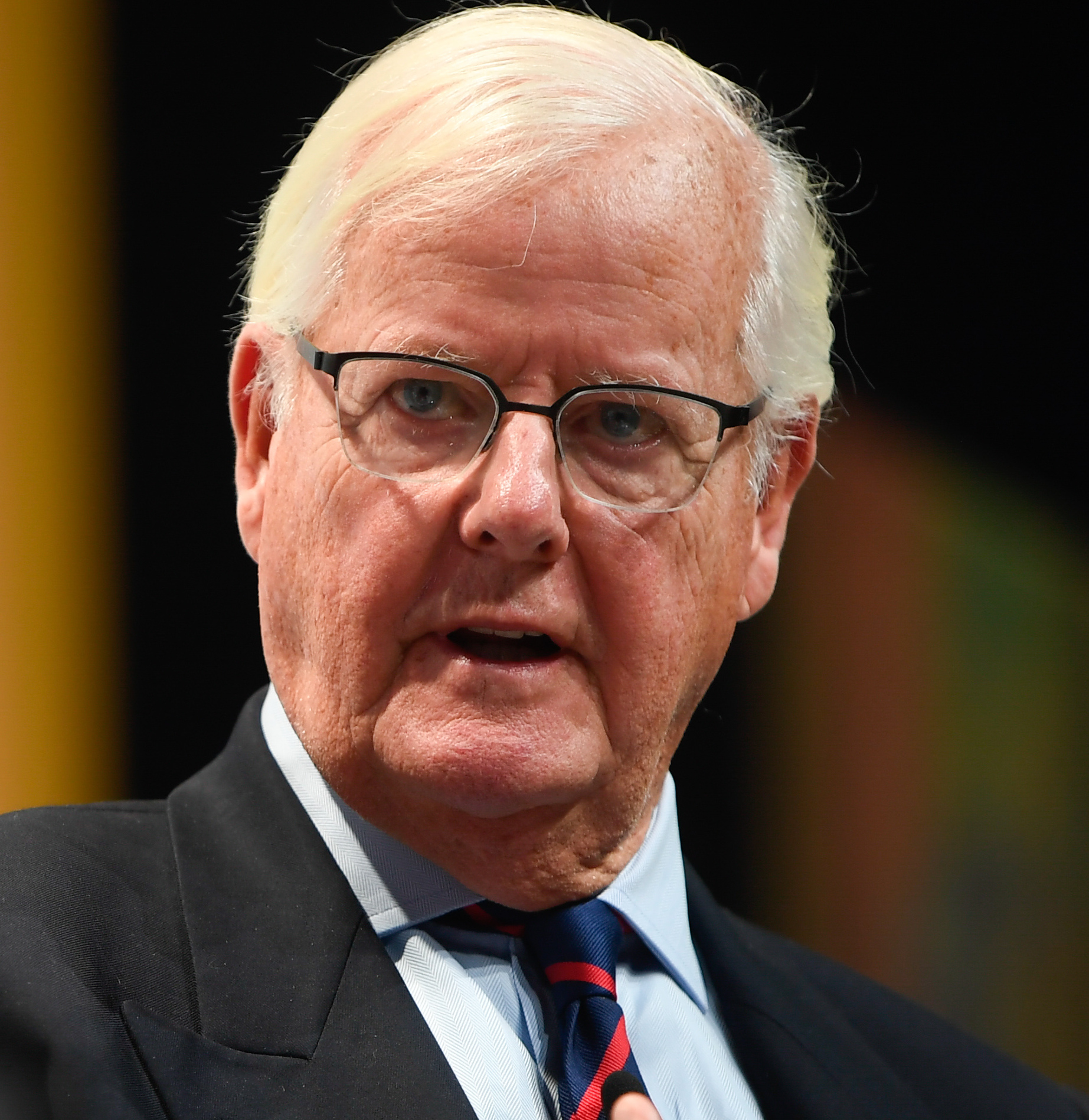
- Guinness in 2011
- Born: September 30, 1941 (age 85); Republic of China
- Education: Oriel College, Oxford (D.Phil.); University of London
- Occupations: Author and social critic
- Writing career
- Language: English
- Website: osguinness.com

Ian Oswald "Os" Guinness (born September 30, 1941) is an English author now based in Fairfax County, Virginia; he has lived in the United States since 1984.

== Early life and education ==
Ian Oswald Guinness was born in China on 30 September 1941, during World War II, as his parents served there as medical missionaries. Guinness is the great-great-great-grandson of Arthur Guinness, a Dublin brewer, and so is of Irish descent. His parents named him after Scottish Baptist evangelist and teacher Oswald Chambers.

Guinness returned to England in 1951 for secondary school and eventual college. He completed an undergraduate degree at the University of London (Bachelor of Divinity with honours, 1966) and a social sciences/theology D.Phil. from Oriel College at Oxford University in 1982, where he studied under Peter L. Berger.

== Career ==
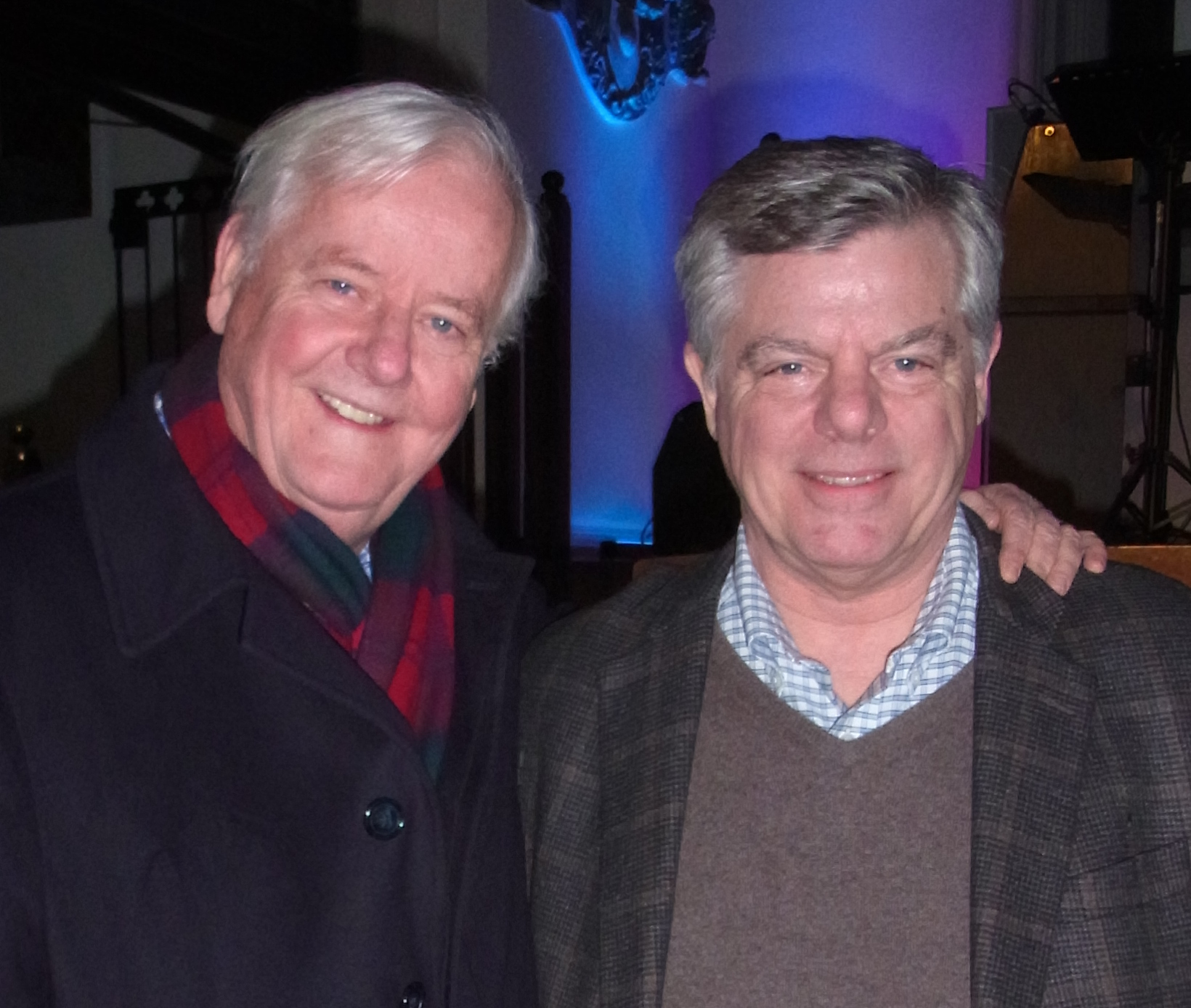
Os Guinness, (left) with apologist Bill Edgar, at Cambridge Inter-Collegiate Christian Union event, St. Andrew the Great, Cambridge, England.

In the late 1960s, Guinness was a leader at the L'Abri community in Switzerland, and, after Oxford, a freelance reporter for the BBC. He wrote his first book, The Dust of Death, in 1973; John Frame called it "a wonderfully erudite and persuasive critique of the western culture of the late 1960s from a thoughtful, balanced Christian perspective."

From 1986 to 1989, Guinness served as executive director of the Williamsburg Charter Foundation, and was the leading drafter of the Williamsburg Charter, a bicentennial clarification and reaffirmation of the religious liberty clauses of the first amendment. He was also a co-author of the public school curriculum, "Living With Our Deepest Differences", and continued through at least 2009 on its Drafting Committee.

Guinness, along with Alonzo McDonald, co-founded The Trinity Forum (in 1991). As of May 2025, he was listed by the organisation as an emeritus Fellow.

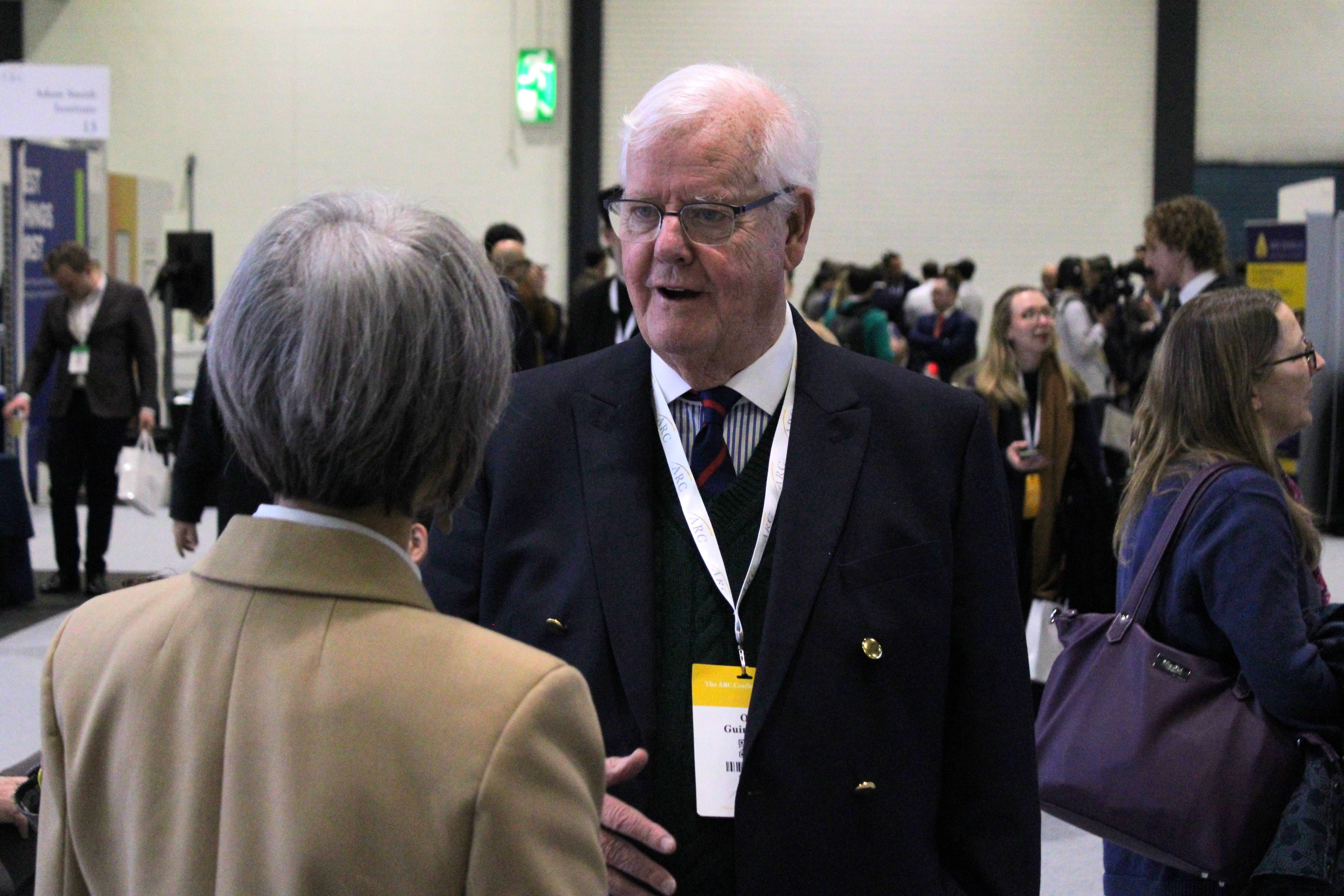
Guinness at the Alliance for Responsible Citizenship, London, 2025

Guinness was a primary drafter of The Global Charter of Conscience, published at the European Union Parliament in Brussels in June 2012. He has also been associated with the EastWest Institute in New York (as a Senior Fellow), with the Woodrow Wilson Center (as a guest scholar), with the Brookings Institution (as a guest scholar and visiting fellow), and as of 2025 was listed as speaker associated with the Oxford Centre for Christian Apologetics.

== Published works ==
As of September 2018, Guinness had written or edited more than 30 books;

Following is a subset of those books, appearing between 1973 and 2024, in chronological order.

=== Authored books ===
- —— (1973), The Dust of Death: A Critique of the Establishment and the Counter Culture and the Proposal for a Third Way, Downers Grove, IL: InterVarsity Press.
- —— (1976), In Two Minds: The Dilemma of Doubt & How to Resolve It, Downers Grove, IL: InterVarsity Press.
- —— (1983), The Gravedigger File, Downers Grove, IL: InterVarsity Press
- —— (1987), Doubt, Downers Grove, IL: InterVarsity Press
- —— (1992), The American Hour: A Time of Reckoning and the Once and Future Role of Faith, New York: Macmillan/Free Press.
- —— (1993), Dining With the Devil: The Megachurch Movement Flirts With Modernity, Ada, MI: Baker.
- —— (1994), The Dust of Death: The Sixties Counterculture and How It Changed America Forever, Wheaton, IL: Crossway.
- —— (1994), Fit Bodies Fat Minds: Why Evangelicals Don't Think and What to Do About It, Ada, MI: Baker.
- —— (1996), God in the Dark: The Assurance of Faith Beyond a Shadow of Doubt, Wheaton, IL: Crossway.
- —— (1998), The Call: Finding and Fulfilling the Central Purpose of Your Life, Nashville, TN: HarperCollins/Thomas Nelson.
- —— (1999), Character Counts: Leadership Qualities in Washington, Wilberforce, Lincoln, and Solzhenitsyn, Ada, MI: Baker.
- —— (2000), Time for Truth: Living Free in a World of Lies, Hype and Spin, Ada, MI: Baker.
- —— (2000), Steering Through Chaos: Vice and Virtue in an Age of Moral Confusion, Carol Stream, IL: Navpress.
- —— (2001), The Great Experiment: Faith and Freedom in America, Carol Stream, IL: Navpress.
- —— (2003), Long Journey Home: A Guide to Your Search for the Meaning of Life, Colorado Springs, CO: PRH/WaterBrook & Multnomah.
- —— (2003), Prophetic Untimeliness: A Challenge to the Idol of Relevance, Ada, MI: Baker.
- —— (2005), Unspeakable: Facing Up to the Challenge of Evil, San Francisco, CA: HarperCollins/HarperOne.
- —— (2008), The Case for Civility: And Why Our Future Depends on It, San Francisco, CA: HarperCollins/HarperOne.
- —— (2010), The Last Christian on Earth: Uncover the Enemy's Plot to Undermine the Church, Ada, MI: Baker/Regal.
- —— (2012), A Free People's Suicide: Sustainable Freedom and the American Future, Downers Grove, IL: InterVarsity Press, archived from the original on 22 December 2016.
- —— (2013), The Global Public Square: Religious Freedom and the Making of a World Safe for Diversity, Downers Grove, IL: InterVarsity Press, archived from the original on 10 February 2017.
- —— (2014), Renaissance: The Power of the Gospel However Dark the Times, Downers Grove, IL: InterVarsity Press, archived from the original on 22 December 2016.
- —— (2015), Fool's Talk: Recovering the Art of Christian Persuasion, Downers Grove, IL: InterVarsity Press.
- —— (2016), Impossible People, Downers Grove, IL: InterVarsity Press.
- —— (2018), Last Call for Liberty: How America's Genius for Freedom Has Become Its Greatest Threat, Downers Grove, IL: InterVarsity Press.
- —— (2019), Carpe Diem Redeemed: Seizing the Day, Discerning the Times, Downers Grove, IL: InterVarsity Press.
- —— (2021), The Magna Carta of Humanity: Sinai's Revolutionary Faith and the Future of Freedom, Downers Grove, IL: InterVarsity Press.
- —— (2022), Zero Hour America, American Audio.
- —— (2024), Our Civilizational Moment: The Waning of the West and the War of the Worlds, Kildare.

=== Edited works ===
- ——, ed. (1990), Articles of Faith, Articles of Peace, Washington, DC: The Brookings Institution.
- ——, ed. (1992), No God but God, Chicago: Moody Press.
- ——; Cowan, Louise, eds. (1998), Invitation to the Classics, Ada, MI: Baker.
- ——, ed. (1999), Unriddling our Times, Ada, MI: Baker.
- ——, ed. (2000), When No One Sees: Character in an Age of Image, Carol Stream, IL: NavPress
- ——, ed. (2001), Doing Well and Doing Good, Carol Stream, IL: NavPress.
- ——, ed. (2001), Entrepreneurs of Life, Carol Stream, IL: NavPress.
- ——, ed. (2001), The Journey, Carol Stream, IL: NavPress.

== Personal life ==
As of 2018, it had been reported that Guinness moved his residence to the Washington, D.C. (in 1984). He and his wife Jenny have one son, and as of this date, they live in McLean, Virginia.

An Anglican, he attended the Episcopal Church, but left, finding it too theologically liberal, in 2006. He currently attends The Falls Church, in the Anglican Church in North America. He was one of the speakers at the Anglican Church in North America Assembly in June 2014.
