= Alonzo L. McDonald =

American businessman and philanthropist (1928–2019)

Alonzo L. McDonald (August 5, 1928 - November 21, 2019) was an American businessman and philanthropist.

== Biography ==
=== Early life ===
He was born in Atlanta, Georgia. He graduated from Emory University in 1948. He served in the United States Marine Corps from 1950 to 1952. He received an M.B.A. from the Harvard Business School in 1956.

=== Career ===
He was a reporter for The Atlanta Journal from 1948 to 1950. He worked for the Westinghouse Electric Corporation from 1956 to 1960.

He worked for McKinsey & Company, serving as partner in New York City and London, and chief executive officer, until he was managing director when he retired in 1977. That year, he was appointed deputy special trade representative and ambassador in charge of the U.S. Delegation to the General Agreement on Tariffs and Trade in Geneva. In 1979, he was appointed assistant to the president of the United States and White House staff director under President Jimmy Carter.

He served as president and vice chairman of the Bendix Corporation from 1981 to 1983. In 1981, he also became a faculty member of the Harvard Business School and served as senior counselor to the dean until 1987.

In 1983, he founded the Avenir Group, a private investment bank.

He was a member of the Council on Foreign Relations, the U.S. Council of the International Chamber of Commerce, the Economic Club of New York, the Center for Inter-American Relations, the Harvard Business School Club of Greater New York and the French-American Foundation.

=== Philanthropy ===
In 1991, together with Os Guinness, he co-founded the Trinity Forum, a Christian non-profit organization, where he served as Senior Fellow and Trustee Emeritus. He donated to The Fellowship.

He was the founder and Chairman of the McDonald Agape Foundation. He donated money to scholars at Harvard University, Yale University, the University of Chicago, Duke University, Emory University, the University of Oxford and the University of Cambridge. Some of his donations went to David N. Hempton at Harvard, Jean Bethke Elshtain at Chicago, or Sarah Coakley at Cambridge. He also funded a sabbatical for Stanley Hauerwas, during which he wrote Hannah's Child: A Theologian's Memoir (2010).

=== Personal life ===
He was married to Suzanne McDonald, and they had four children. They resided in Birmingham, Michigan. He converted to Roman Catholicism at the age of seventy-nine. He has 12 grandchildren.

His son Alex McDonald is an author of books regarding the Israeli Palestine conflicts.
