= The Flat Hat =

Newspaper in Williamsburg, Virginia

- Stabilitas et Fides
- Type: Biweekly (during academic year)
- School: William & Mary
- Editor-in-chief: Mona Garimella
- Managing editor: Maddie Mohamadi
- Founded: October 3, 1911
- Circulation: 1,600
- Website: https://flathatnews.com

The Flat Hat is the official student newspaper of William & Mary in Williamsburg, Virginia. Founded in 1911, it publishes every other Tuesday during the College's academic year. The newspaper's name is derived from the F.H.C. Society, the first collegiate secret society in the territory of the present United States, which was established at William & Mary in 1750 and nicknamed the Flat Hat Club. From its inception, The Flat Hat was published weekly until 2007, when it transitioned to a twice-weekly format. In 2015, it reverted to weekly publication, and in response to the COVID-19 pandemic, it shifted to an every-two-weeks schedule in fall 2020. The Flat Hat staff operates out of its office in William & Mary's Sadler Center.

The newspaper is currently printed as a broadsheet. During the early 1990s, The Flat Hat featured a colored front page and a separate colored variety section. Today, the front and back pages are generally printed in color, while the inside pages are printed in black and white.

== History ==
The name "Flat Hat" traces back to the F.H.C. Society, a secret fraternity established at the College on November 11, 1750, and commonly known as the Flat Hat Club. Notable members included St. George Tucker, Thomas Jefferson, and George Wythe. As a collegiate fraternity, the Flat Hat Club predates Phi Beta Kappa, which was founded at William & Mary in 1776 and is now the leading academic honor society for undergraduates in the arts and sciences. A 1928 issue of The Flat Hat indicates that twentieth-century members of the Flat Hat Club were directly responsible for the creation of the newspaper.

The F.H.C.'s badge featured a Rococo rendering of the Society's coat of arms on the reverse, and "FHC" in a large monogram on the obverse, with the date "Nov. XI. MDCCL" and motto "Stabilitas et Fides" below. The motto, "Stabilitas et Fides" (Stability and Faith), has been the motto of The Flat Hat since founding.

=== Censorship ===
Since 1945, The Flat Hat has generally maintained relative editorial control and autonomy. The paper has no faculty adviser. The Flat Hat is a member of William & Mary's Media Council, a body made up of the editors of most publications on campus, as well as a member of the college administration. The Media Council has direct financial control over The Flat Hat, which is supervised and run through William & Mary's Student Assembly.

==== Marilyn Kaemmerle ====
In February 1945, The Flat Hat published an editorial by then-editor Marilyn Kaemmerle titled "Lincoln's Job Half-Done," commemorating Abraham Lincoln's birthday. In the editorial, Kaemmerle advocated for racial integration at William & Mary and argued that "the Negroes should be recognized as equals in our minds and hearts." Kaemmerle further explained that education would be the crucial step toward offering "equal opportunities...to all people in all sections of the country".

Following the publication of the editorial, the Board of Visitors instructed then-President John Pomfret to remove Kaemmerle from her position as editor-in-chief. Pomfret complied with the Board's directive and Kaemmerle was removed from The Flat Hat. Desegregation at William & Mary began approximately ten years later. In 1986, the Board of Visitors formally apologized to Kaemmerle for its actions in 1945.

==== The Blue Room Incident ====
In 1962, The Flat Hat published an editorial critical of then-president Davis Young Paschall's decision to prohibit a communist speaker from appearing on campus. Subsequently, Paschall summoned then-editor H. Mason Sizemore and other staff members to a meeting in the Blue Room of the Wren Building. Details of the meeting remain a point of discussion, but accounts suggest Paschall expressed his strong disapproval of the editorial. Staff members refused to apologize, and were allowed to continue publishing.

=== Website ===
The Flat Hat launched their website in the fall of 2006, which is hosted by WordPress. The website is updated daily with printed articles, online blogs, videos, podcasts, photojournalism stories, and the embedded pdf of its most recent Issuu.

=== Flat Hat Magazine ===
The Flat Hat Magazine was launched in November 2019 as a supplement to the weekly newspaper. The magazine provides a platform for longer-form journalism and creative design content. Publication occurs once every semester, with the exception of spring 2020 when disruptions related to the COVID-19 pandemic affected production.

== Staff ==
The exact number of staff who work on The Flat Hat varies each year but generally ranges between forty-five and fifty permanent staff members (students who are listed in the staff box of each issue of the newspaper). The paper is produced entirely by a volunteer all-undergraduate staff. Students with or without experience in journalism are often encouraged to join. In 2010, the newspaper began an intern program focusing on providing journalistic experiences for underclassmen at William & Mary.

Like most other collegiate student newspapers, the staff includes not only reporters and columnists but an accounting department, a copyediting section, an Ombudsman and an executive and editorial staff.

== Major stories ==
In October 2006, The Flat Hat was the first news outlet, student or professional, to report on the controversy surrounding the removal of a cross from the Wren Chapel. Starting with a news brief, the paper continued to provide in-depth coverage as the issue unfolded, including the revocation of a twelve-million-dollar donation, the placement of the cross in a display case, and, ultimately, the resignation of College President Gene Nichol, which was partly attributed to the Wren Chapel controversy. The Flat Hat's reporting provided a comprehensive account of the events and the various perspectives involved.

In January 2010, The Flat Hat was the first news source to report that ESPN continued to use a William & Mary athletic emblem that had been banned by the NCAA in 2006. ESPN ultimately discontinued the use of the emblem.

In May 2010, The Flat Hat was the first journalistic source in Williamsburg, professional or other, to announce the election of Scott Foster to the city council governing Williamsburg. Foster was the first William & Mary student ever to be elected to the council, and he had been endorsed by the editorial board of The Flat Hat.

== Special issues ==
=== The Fat Head ===
On April 1, in honor of April Fool's Day, the newspaper has sometimes printed The Fat Head to accompany the usual semi-weekly issue. The Fat Head is a humor issue, usually with falsified articles and satirical commentary.

== Notable alumni ==
- James Comey '82 – Lawyer and seventh director of the FBI
- Ben Domenech – Co-founder of The Federalist website
- Mike D'Orso '75 – Author and journalist
- Jill Ellis '88 – Soccer manager
- David Lasky '90 – Alternative cartoonist
- Patton Oswalt '91 – Stand-up comedian and actor
- Amanda Petrusich '00 – Music journalist

== See also ==
- List of publications at The College of William & Mary
- List of college and university student newspapers in the United States
