= Williamsburg Premium Outlets =

Shopping center in Virginia, US

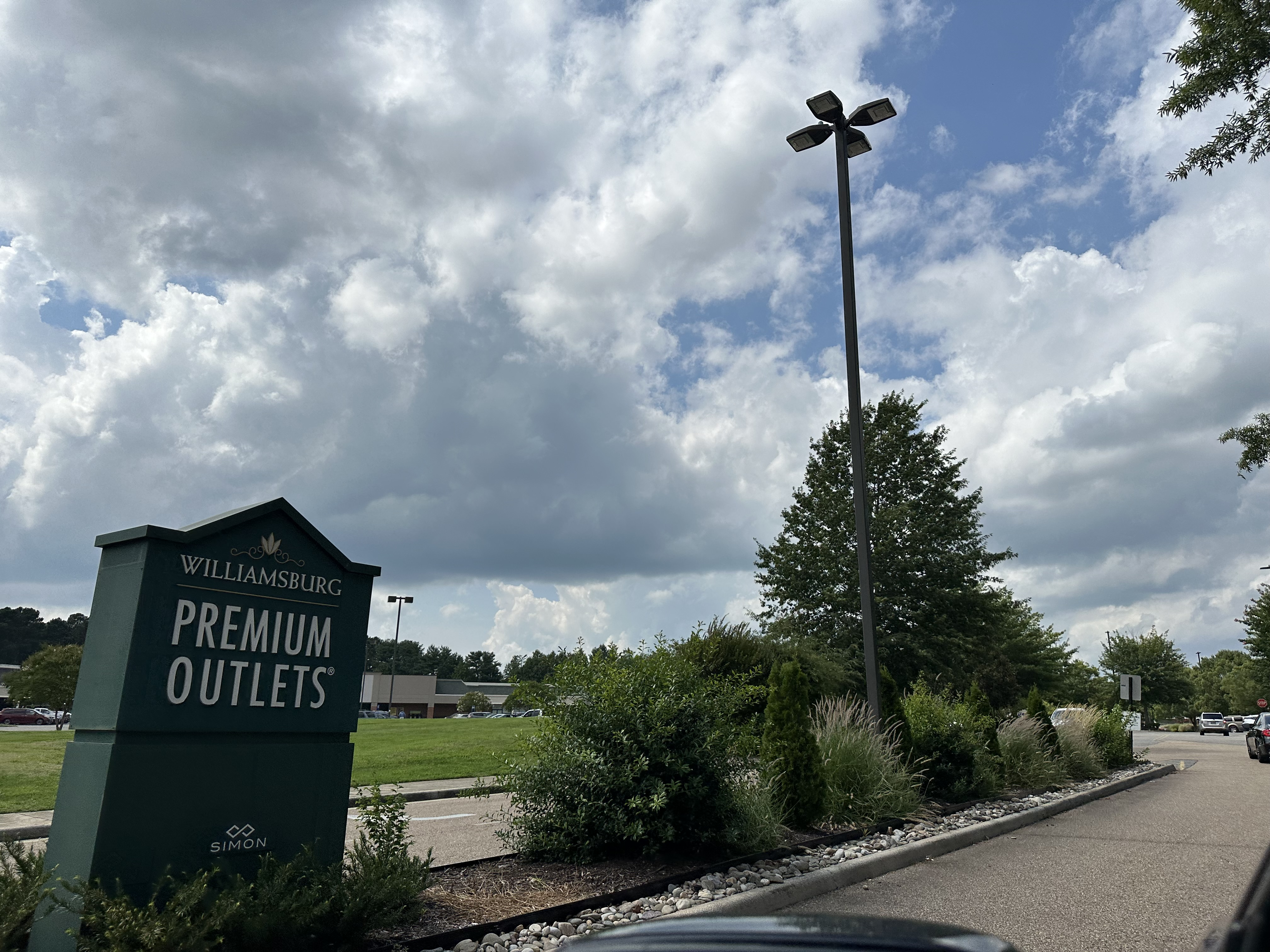
- Location: James City County, Virginia, United States
- Coordinates: 37.3194°N 76.7368°W
- Address: 5715-62A Richmond Road
- Opened: 1988; renovated 2008
- Developer: McArthurGlen Group
- Manager: Simon Premium Outlets
- Owner: Simon Property Group
- Num. of stores: 135
- Floors: 1
- Public transit: Williamsburg Area Transit Authority Route 2 (Blue/Richmond Rd)
- Website: www.premiumoutlets.com/outlet/williamsburg

Williamsburg Premium Outlets, formerly Prime Outlets and Berkeley Commons, is an outlet shopping complex located in James City County, Virginia, United States, near Williamsburg. It was built in 1988 by McArthur/Glen Group of Washington, D.C. The shopping center has 135 stores, and it is owned and operated by Premium Outlets, a division of Simon Property Group. The mall was renovated in 2008.

On November 23, 2024, a fire started under the back overflow parking lot, which caused part of the lot to collapse. The fire burned for more than five days before being extinguished by the James City County Fire Department and Newport News Fire Department. The fire began in plastic crates under the parking lot used as part of a stormwater system. In August 2025, James City County released a video documentary on the event, noting that the fire's cause remains a mystery.
