= Williamsburg Charter =

The Williamsburg Charter is a document that was drafted in 1986 to reaffirm the Religious Liberty clauses of the US Bill of Rights.

The lead drafter was Os Guinness. At the time he was the Executive Director of the Williamsburg Charter Foundation.

The Charter was signed by almost 100 nationally prominent figures on June 22, 1988. This was in commemoration of the 200th anniversary of Virginia's call for a Bill of Rights. Among the signatories were Presidents Gerald Ford and Jimmy Carter; the late Chief Justice of the US Supreme Court William Rehnquist; the late activist Coretta Scott King (wife of slain civil rights leader Martin Luther King Jr.) and Focus on the Family founder James Dobson.

The document affirms the need for a lively and reasoned debate on the role of religion in the public life of the United States.

Its primary focus is on the Establishment Clause and Free Exercise Clause, contained within the first amendment of the United States Constitution. The goal of the writers is to "affirm both their cardinal assumptions and the reasons for their crucial national importance".

The writers believe that the problems surrounding the religion clauses can only be solved by first understanding the nature of the clauses. Among the points raised in the charter is that non-religious hostility towards religion is just as dangerous to a democracy as religious hostility towards non-religion or to other religions.
