= Student fee =

Educational charge in addition to tuition fee

A student fee or student activity fee is a fee charged to students at a school, college, university or other place of learning that is in addition to any matriculation and/or tuition fees. It may be charged to support student organizations and student activities (for which it can be called an activity fee) or for intercollegiate programs such as intramural sports or visiting academics; or, at a public university or college, as a means to remedy shortfalls in state funding (in which case it can often be called a technology fee). Further fees may then be charged for features and facilities such as insurance, health and parking provision.

== United States ==
=== Constitutionality of activity fees ===
In the United States, the constitutionality of mandatory student activity fees has been adjudicated several times by the Supreme Court. Most recently, the Court has ruled that public universities may subsidize political groups by means of a mandatory student activity fees so long as the manner in which such funds are dispersed are political neutral.

[T]he First Amendment permits a public university to charge its students an activity fee used to fund a program to facilitate extracurricular student speech, provided that the program is viewpoint neutral.”

— Supreme Court Justice Anthony Kennedy, Board of Regents of the University of Wisconsin System v. Southworth et al.

Despite the commentary of the US Supreme Court, most student activity fee funds are today used by-and-large for non-political purposes.

[Research has] found that, by and large, funds distributed by student governments go to non-political organizations. Where fees are used for political groups, the distribution seems to reflect the preferences of the student body; thus, they meet the Supreme Court’s “viewpoint neutral” standard.

— Jenna Ashley Robinson, Student Activity Fees: Who Gets What and Why?

=== Student fee cases ===
- Rosenberger v. University of Virginia, 515 U. S. 819 (1995)
- Board of Regents of the University of Wisconsin System v. Southworth 529 U.S. 217 (2000)

== Examples ==
=== University of New Hampshire ===
The Student Activity Fee of the University of New Hampshire is relatively unique amongst other comparable institutions of secondary education in that the fee is administered by its autonomous student government, free from faculty or staff advisors. During fiscal year 2019, all undergraduate students attending UNH paid $89 towards their fee.

== See also ==
- Higher education in the United States
- College tuition in the United States
