= Althea Hunt =

American dramatist and educator

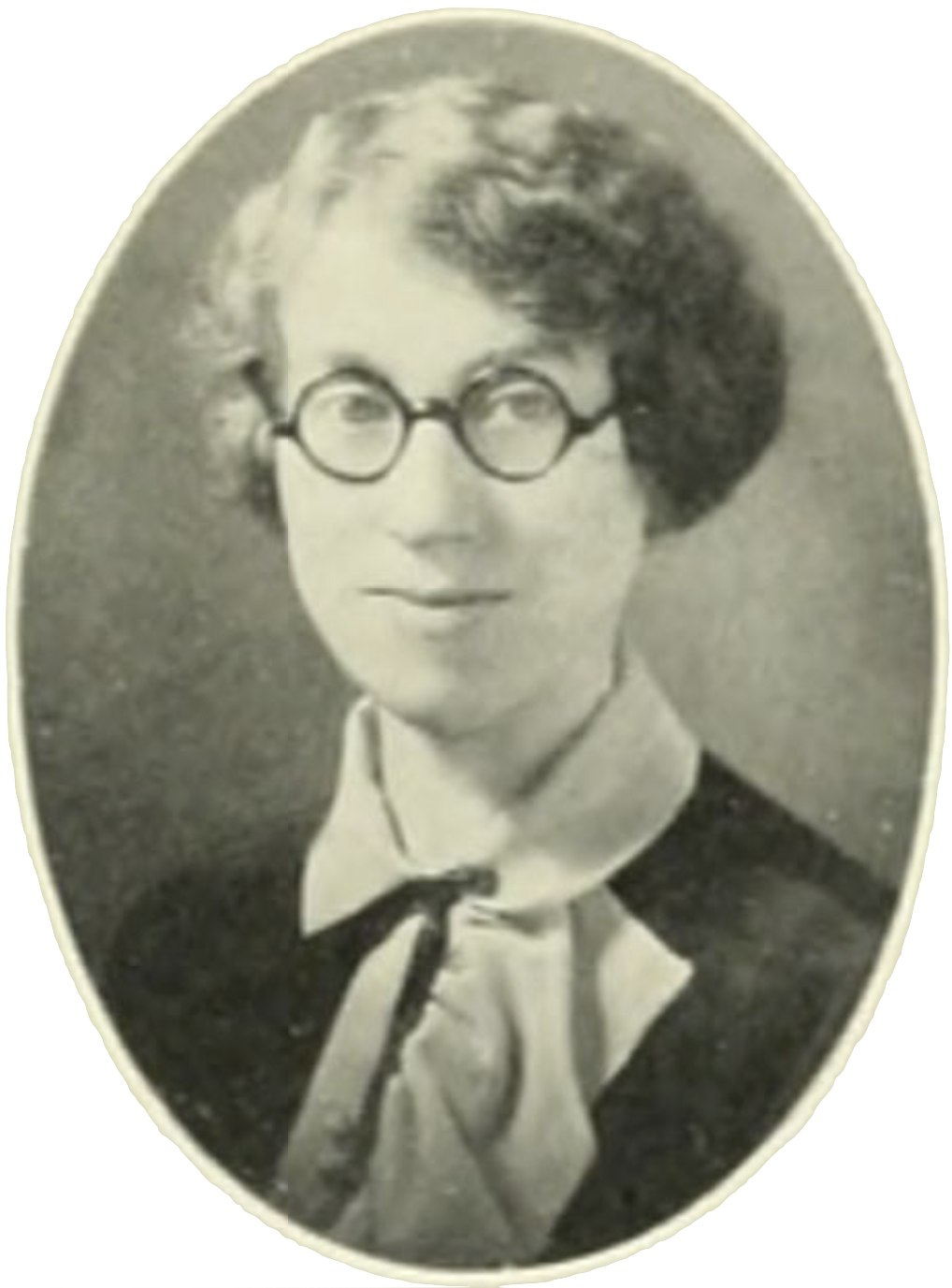
- Hunt in 1927
- Born: December 7, 1890; Conneaut, Ohio, US
- Died: April 1, 1971 (aged 80); Williamsburg, Virginia, US
- Resting place: Kingsville, Ohio
- Education: Allegheny College (A.B., Litt.D.); Radcliffe College (M.A.)
- Occupations: Teacher, theater director, professor
- Employer(s): John Marshall High School; College of William & Mary

Althea Hunt (December 7, 1890 – April 1, 1971) was an American theater director and educator who was on the faculty at the College of William & Mary for 35 years, where she established the William & Mary Theatre. Born in Ohio, Hunt worked as an English teacher at John Marshall High School in Richmond, Virginia, before joining the college's faculty in 1926. There, she continued teaching English and established the college's theater program. She was the director of the college's theater program until 1957, and she retired from the faculty in 1961. She also served as director for the inaugural season of The Common Glory, an outdoor drama staged in Williamsburg, Virginia.

While at William & Mary, Hunt conducted and published research on theater. After retiring from teaching, she edited a book on the history of the William & Mary Theatre. William & Mary renamed a dormitory for her and also named a green room in Phi Beta Kappa Memorial Hall after her and her successor as director, Howard Scammon.

== Early life and career ==
Hunt was born on December 7, 1890, in Conneaut, Ohio, as the daughter of Henry H. Hunt and Agnes E. Hunt (née Howard). She was the descendant of English settlers of New England. She had a brother, Harrison R. Hunt, though none of her family lived near her at the time of her death. When Halley's Comet was visible in 1910, she was still living in Conneaut.

Hunt attended Allegheny College in Meadville, Pennsylvania, where she received an A.B. degree. While at Allegheny, she participated in dramatic performances produced by two student groups. She began teaching at the high school of Meadville. She then taught at John Marshall High School in Richmond, Virginia, where she remained for several years. In 1916, she was listed among the white teachers in the English department of the high school, part of the Richmond Public Schools system administered by superintendent J. A. C. Chandler. Alongside every other teacher at John Marshall High School, Hunt was among the petitioners who supported the erection of a new library for the school in 1922. While teaching at the high school, her interest in theater increased and she began to use plays as an element in her course instruction.

After teaching for several years, Hunt took a year off from teaching and received her M.A. degree from Radcliffe College in Cambridge, Massachusetts. While at Radcliffe, Hunt studied under George Pierce Baker, a professor of drama. In 1925, Hunt was again recorded as teaching at John Marshall High School.

== Work at William & Mary ==
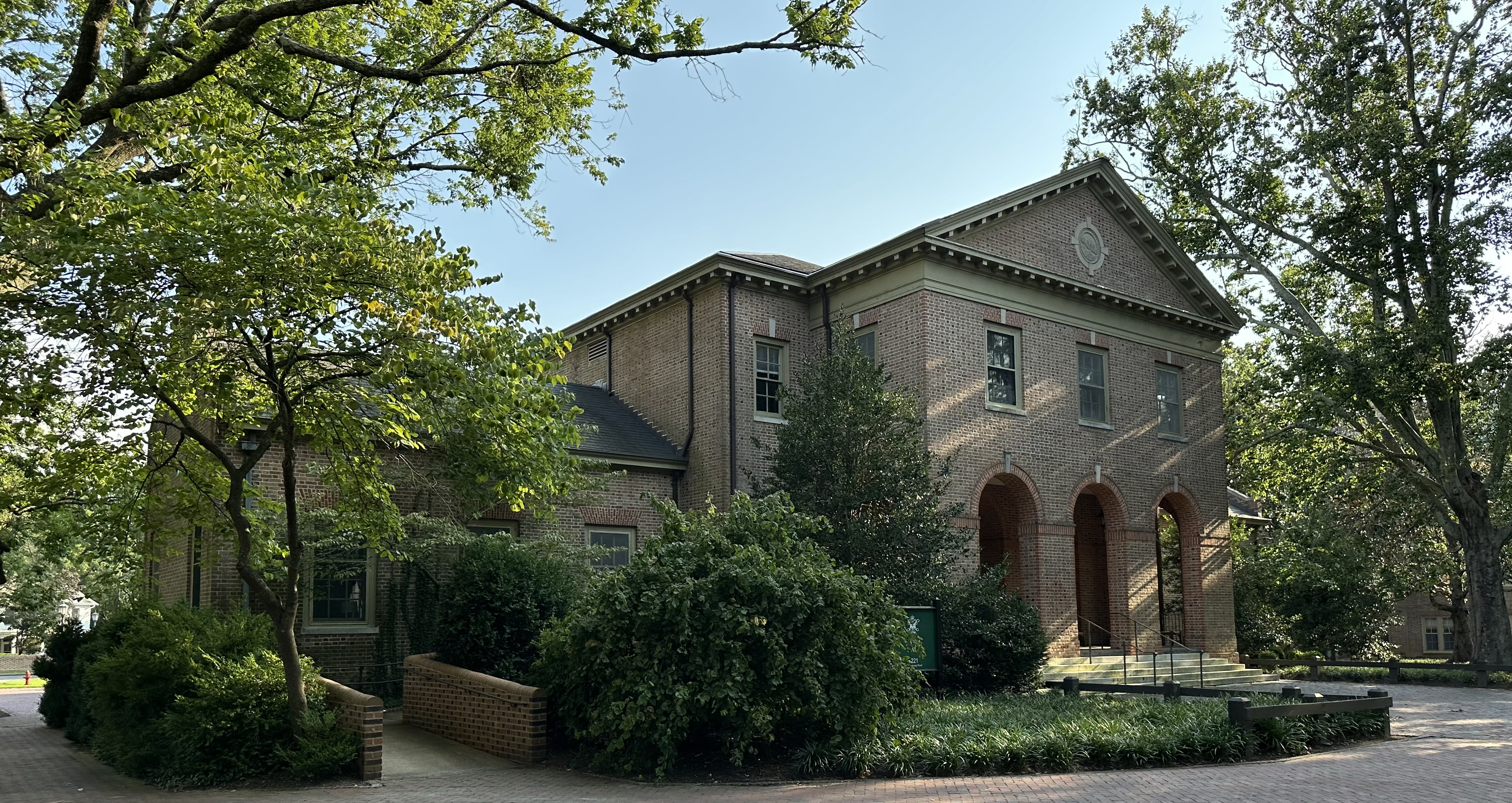
Ewell Hall, formerly Phi Beta Kappa Memorial Hall, was where Hunt began hosting productions of the William & Mary Theatre.

In 1926, Hunt was invited by Chandler, by then the president of the College of William & Mary, to come to the college in Williamsburg and teach. She was assigned to launch a new play production course, as student interest in theater at the college had seen the creation of a chapter of the drama fraternity Theta Alpha Phi in 1925. She arrived in Williamsburg in September, and was accompanied by her mother in moving into an apartment on Richmond Road, where they lived with Kathleen Alsop. That same month, she became part of the faculty.

Hunt began work in the college's English department, launching her theater courses in 1926. Her course on play production was the first of its kind at any liberal arts college in Virginia. Her class's first productions were three one-act plays performed without audiences inside the Wren Chapel in November 1926. From the outset of her teaching, students liked Hunt for her punctuality and demanding nature, and Chandler felt he had made the right decision in inviting her to the college. The course was initially interpreted as easy by the students, but Hunt's issuance of poor grades when the class's first report cards were released led to both her and the course's popularity suffering among the students. However, the negative sentiments soon softened into respect and students came to hold affection for her and her demands.

Phi Beta Kappa Memorial Hall (now Ewell Hall) was opened on the campus in 1926. The building featured a large auditorium meant to host events featuring public speaking, such as convocations and graduations. However, Hunt began to utilize the space for theater. Hunt founded the William & Mary Theatre for the presentation of theatrical productions, for which she served as the theater director. The first public performance by her play production class was Lewis Beach's The Goose Hangs High. The first performance drew a large audience, who warmly received it despite the auditorium's inadequacies.

Subsequent productions under Hunt's direction were presented by the college's Dramatic Club and Theta Alpha Phi from 1926 to 1929. In 1930, the William & Mary Players took over the productions, which they presented until 1937. In 1935, the academic theater program was moved from the English department to the newly formed Department of Fine Arts. Hunt served as the director during the 1947 inaugural season of Paul Green's The Common Glory, an outdoor play performed at the amphitheater on the shore of the college's Lake Matoaka. In 1949, she directed the college's production of the 18th-century American playwright Robert Munford III's The Candidates. It was the satire's first performance, appearing after the play was published in the William and Mary Quarterly the previous year.

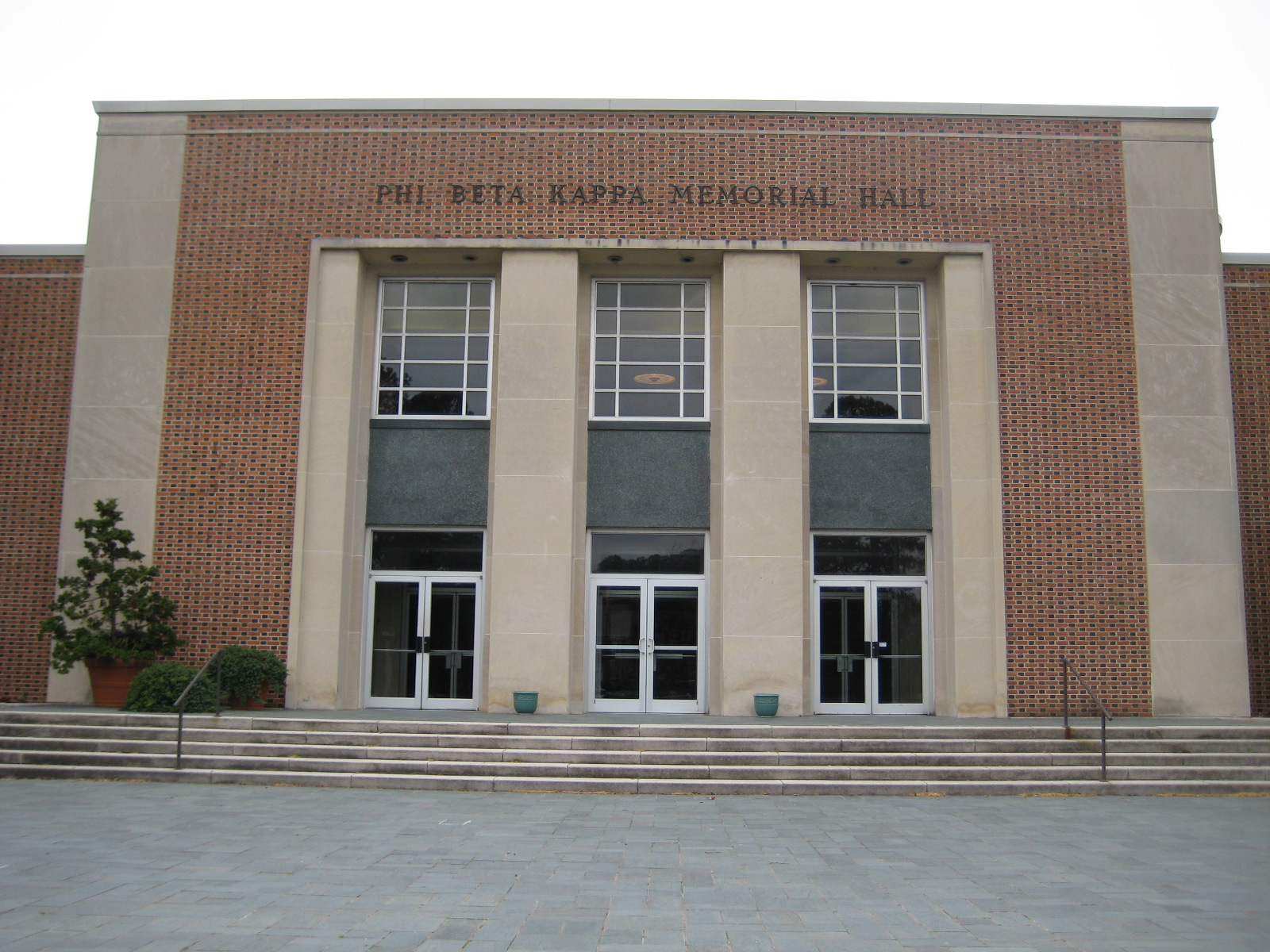
After the original Phi Beta Kappa Memorial Hall was damaged in 1953, Hunt lobbied in support of the construction of a new Phi Beta Kappa Memorial Hall that opened in 1957 (pictured in 2008).

On September 17, 1951, the William & Mary faculty voted unanimously to support a document criticizing the administration of the college's athletic program. The document described the athletic program as a malignant presence at the college in the wake of the 1951 William & Mary scandal. Hunt signed the original document, which was published in the student newspaper The Flat Hat on September 20.

Hunt opposed encouraging students to pursue careers in theater and criticized professors who did so. She served as the Institute of the Theatre's director in the summers of 1948, 1949, and 1950. She was a member of the American National Theater and Academy, Phi Beta Kappa, Mortar Board, Alpha Chi Omega, and Theta Alpha Phi. She was named as an honorary Doctor of Letters by Allegheny College in 1956.

Phi Beta Kappa Memorial Hall was damaged in a fire in 1953. Hunt moved the William & Mary Theatre's productions to high school auditoriums and basketball courts, including Blow Hall, while lobbying for the construction of a new theater space. A new Phi Beta Kappa Memorial Hall was opened in 1957, largely due to her efforts. She ended her tenure as the college's theater director in 1957, with Howard Scammon serving as her successor. That same year, Hunt served on the College Committee to Assist in the Virginia 350th Festival Year, commemorating the establishment of Virginia at Jamestown in 1607. The college produced an original play that year: Christian Moe's Hark Upon the Gale, on the history of the college.

In 1961, with four other William & Mary professors, Hunt donated a 17th-century copy of John Gerard's Herball to the college library. Hunt retired from the college in February that year, and she was recognized by the college's Board of Visitors as Professor Emeritus of Fine Arts.

== Later life and death ==
Hunt never married. In 1964, she identified as a political independent. As of the same year, she was a member of the First Unitarian Church of Richmond and lived in Williamsburg at 213 Harrison Avenue. In 1968, Hunt received a 275th Anniversary Medallion from William & Mary's president Davis Y. Paschall at a meeting of the college's alumni. Paschall referred to Hunt as "the First Lady of the Theatre". She edited a book on the history of the William & Mary Theatre, The William and Mary Theatre: A Chronicle, which was published in 1968.

Hunt died on April 1, 1971, in her Williamsburg home. At the time of her death, she was a member of the Unitarian Fellowship of Williamsburg and living at the same Harrison Avenue address. A memorial service for her was held in the Wren Chapel on the William & Mary campus on April 4, with her remains interred in Kingsville, Ohio.

== Legacy ==
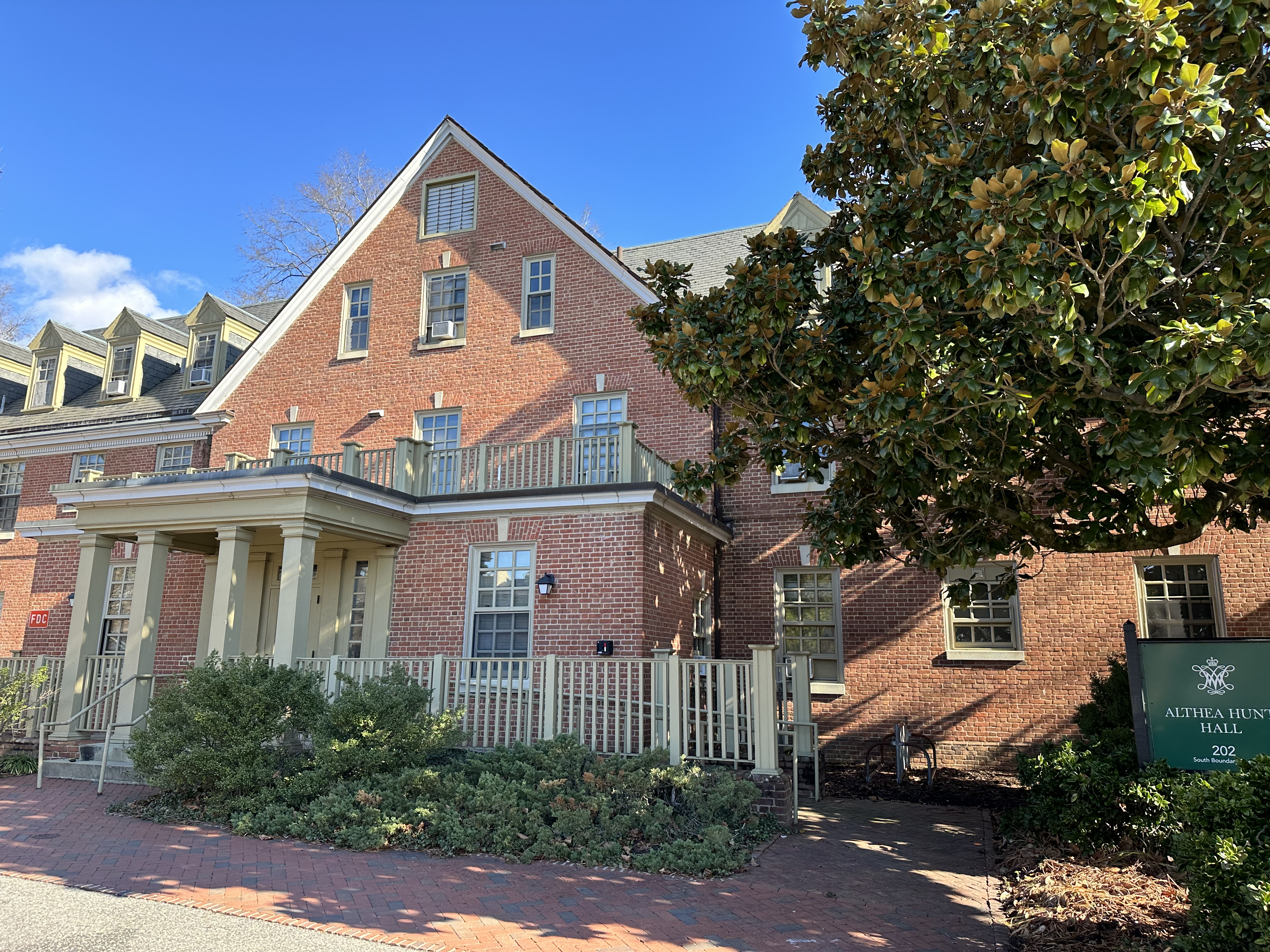
The Althea Hunt Hall on William & Mary's campus was renamed in her honor in 1974.

A memorial book fund was established in her name to support the College of William & Mary upon her death. Another fund supporting the college's endowment was created in the names of Hunt and Scammon. In 1973, the David King Infirmary (built 1930) on the college's campus was converted into a dormitory. It was renamed in honor of Hunt in 1974 as Hunt Hall. In 2019, new signs were installed in front of that building and others on the campus named for women to more clearly indicate that they were named in honor of women, with the new sign in front of the dorm reading "Althea Hunt Hall".

The second Phi Beta Kappa Memorial Hall was substantially altered in the 21st century. In 2025, shortly after its reopening, college alumnus John Reese sponsored the naming of a green room in the building for Hunt and Scammon. Reese credited his career in theater to the two.
