= Ewell Hall =

Academic building in Virginia, US

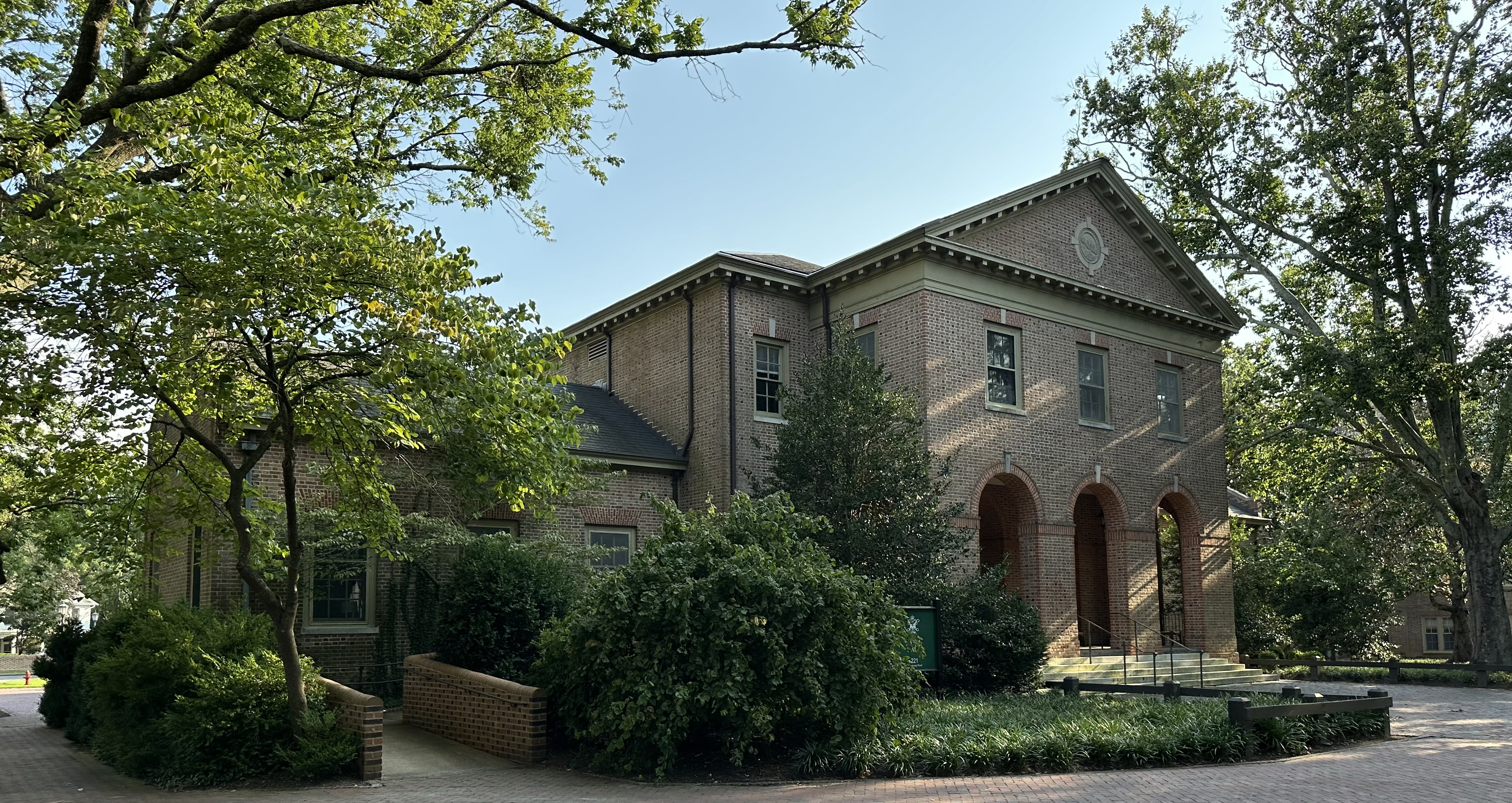
- Ewell Hall, 2024

General information
- Location: 221 Jamestown Road
- Coordinates: 37°16′13″N 76°42′36″W
- Year built: 1925–1926
- Groundbreaking: June 3, 1925
- Opened: November 27, 1926
- Renovated: 1954, 1957–1958, 1988
- Owner: College of William & Mary

Design and construction
- Architects: John Kevan Peebles, Finlay Forbes Ferguson (1925)
- Architecture firm: C. L. Lewis & Company (1957–1958)

Ewell Hall is an academic building on the campus of the College of William & Mary in Williamsburg, Virginia, United States. The building was constructed in 1925–1926 on what is now Old Campus, across from Tucker Hall on the Sunken Garden. It was originally named Phi Beta Kappa Memorial Hall for Phi Beta Kappa, an honor society founded at the College of William & Mary and the oldest such society in the United States. John D. Rockefeller Jr. attended the hall's 1926 dedication; during this visit, W. A. R. Goodwin convinced Rockefeller to participate in a restoration program that became Colonial Williamsburg.

After a severe fire destroyed the auditorium portion of the building in 1953, a new Phi Beta Kappa Memorial Hall was opened in 1956. The building was renamed Ewell Hall for Benjamin Stoddert Ewell, a 19th-century president of the college, in 1957 and has hosted the music department the College of Arts & Sciences administrative offices.

== History ==
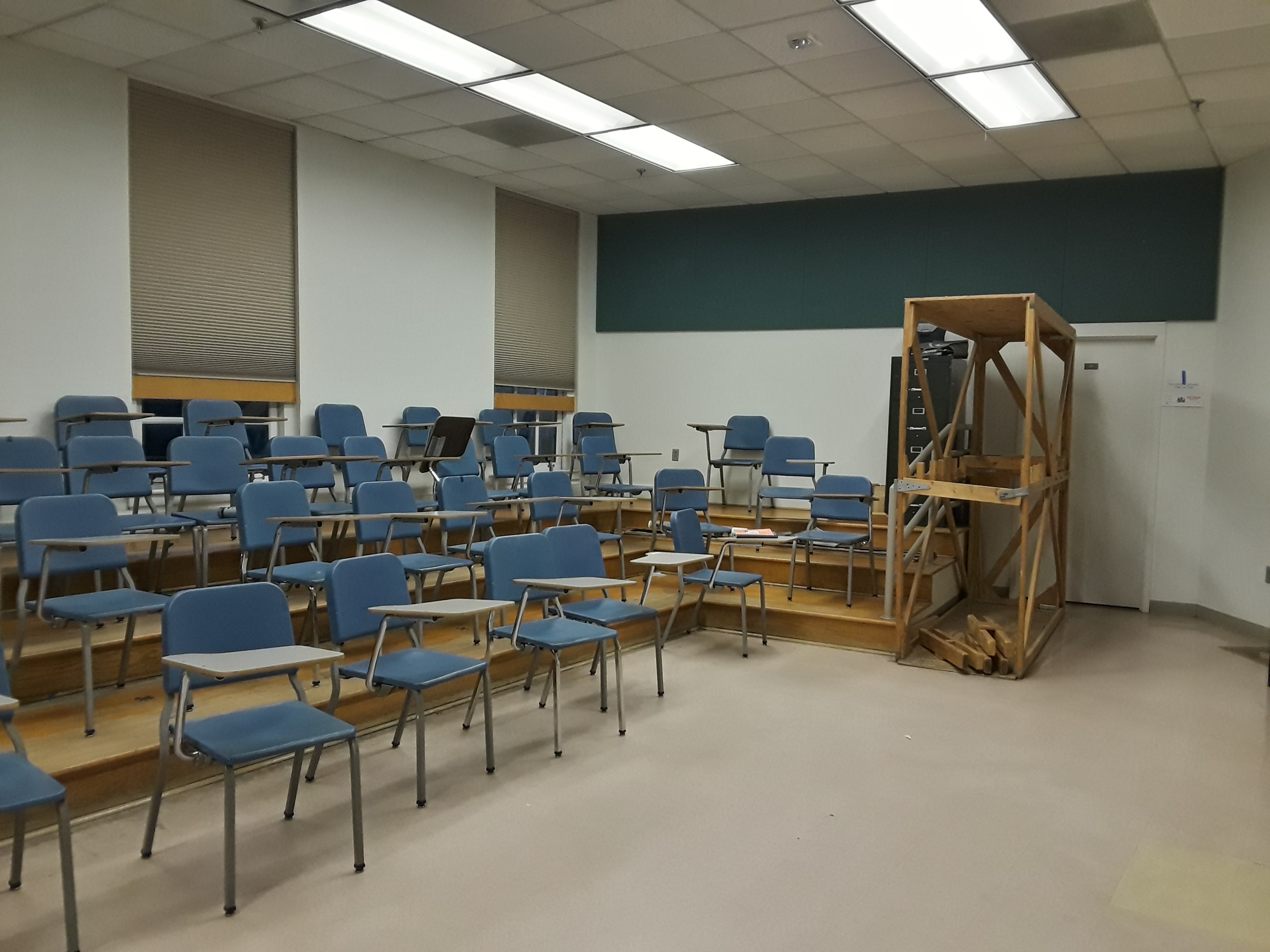
Ewell 151, the former choir room, seen after hours in October 2023

J. A. C. Chandler, the President of William & Mary, proposed the construction of Phi Beta Kappa Memorial Hall in 1919 and the college's Board of Visitors approved the plan in 1923. Phi Beta Kappa is the United States' oldest honor society and was founded at William & Mary in 1776. The building was part of new construction on the college's campus spurred by William & Mary becoming coeducational in 1918.

W. A. R. Goodwin, a professor at the college and the Episcopalian rector of the nearby Bruton Parish Church, had envisioned a restoration program in Williamsburg to promote a homogenous interpretation of American history since at least 1905. In February 1924, Goodwin met philanthropist John D. Rockefeller Jr. (who had been a member of PBK at Brown University) at a banquet for Phi Beta Kappa in New York City. Goodwin asked Rockefeller to sponsor the construction of Phi Beta Kappa Memorial Hall but Rockefeller turned Goodwin down.

The cornerstone of Phi Beta Kappa Memorial Hall was laid on June 3, 1925, during a ceremony which featured a Masonic rite. Rockefeller attended the building's dedication on November 27, 1926, after which Goodwin took Rockefeller on a driving and walking tour of the town. Partially convinced by Goodwin's plan, Rockefeller agreed to fund sketches by the architects of Perry, Shaw & Hepburn of possible restoration work. Rockefeller would wire Goodwin the money to purchase the Ludwell–Paradise House, the first Rockefeller-funded property purchase for the Colonial Williamsburg project, in December 1926. Archaeologists with the Colonial Williamsburg Foundation discovered foundations for an unfinished Wren Building expansion in 1950. Thomas Jefferson had proposed the expansion in 1772.

The building featured a large auditorium, which intended as a host events featuring public speaking, like convocations and graduations. However, the then-new faculty member and founder of the William & Mary Theatre Althea Hunt began to utilize the space for theater. The first public production by her Play Production class was Lewis Beach's The Goose Hangs High. This first performance drew a large audience, who warmly received it despite the auditorium's inadequacies.

The building's auditorium burned on December 29, 1953. In 1952, the national offices of Phi Beta Kappa had moved into the building; they moved to Washington, D.C., afterwards. The 1953 fire was described by David L. Holmes as the college's worst fire of the 20th century. After the fire, a new Phi Beta Kappa Memorial Hall was opened in 1957. Rockefeller provided $250,000 (equivalent to $2,997,212 in 2025) for the reconstruction of the original Phi Beta Kappa Memorial Hall in 1954. Following the restoration, it was renamed as Ewell Hall in 1957 to honor of former college president Benjamin Stoddert Ewell. It is the third building to be named for Ewell on the campus: the College Hotel was renamed for Ewell in 1894 after his death and, following that building's demolition in 1927, the name was transferred to a science building on the campus's north until it too was torn down in 1932.

In 2021, in the wake of the George Floyd protests, the college renamed a number of buildings that had been named for racists. Despite the opinion of the working group that had recommended the renamings, Ewell's name was retained on Ewell Hall. Ewell, who is buried on the college's campus, had served in the Confederate States Army during the American Civil War. College president Katherine Rowe defended the decision, saying "Ewell’s story is one we should honor and share because of his actions, over many years, to resist Secession and undo the depredations of slavery, before and after the war".

The William & Mary Choir utilized Ewell Hall until the opening of the renovated Phi Beta Kappa Memorial Hall and the new Music Building of the Arts Quarter in 2023. Ewell Hall has hosted the music department and the College of Arts & Sciences administrative offices.

== Design ==
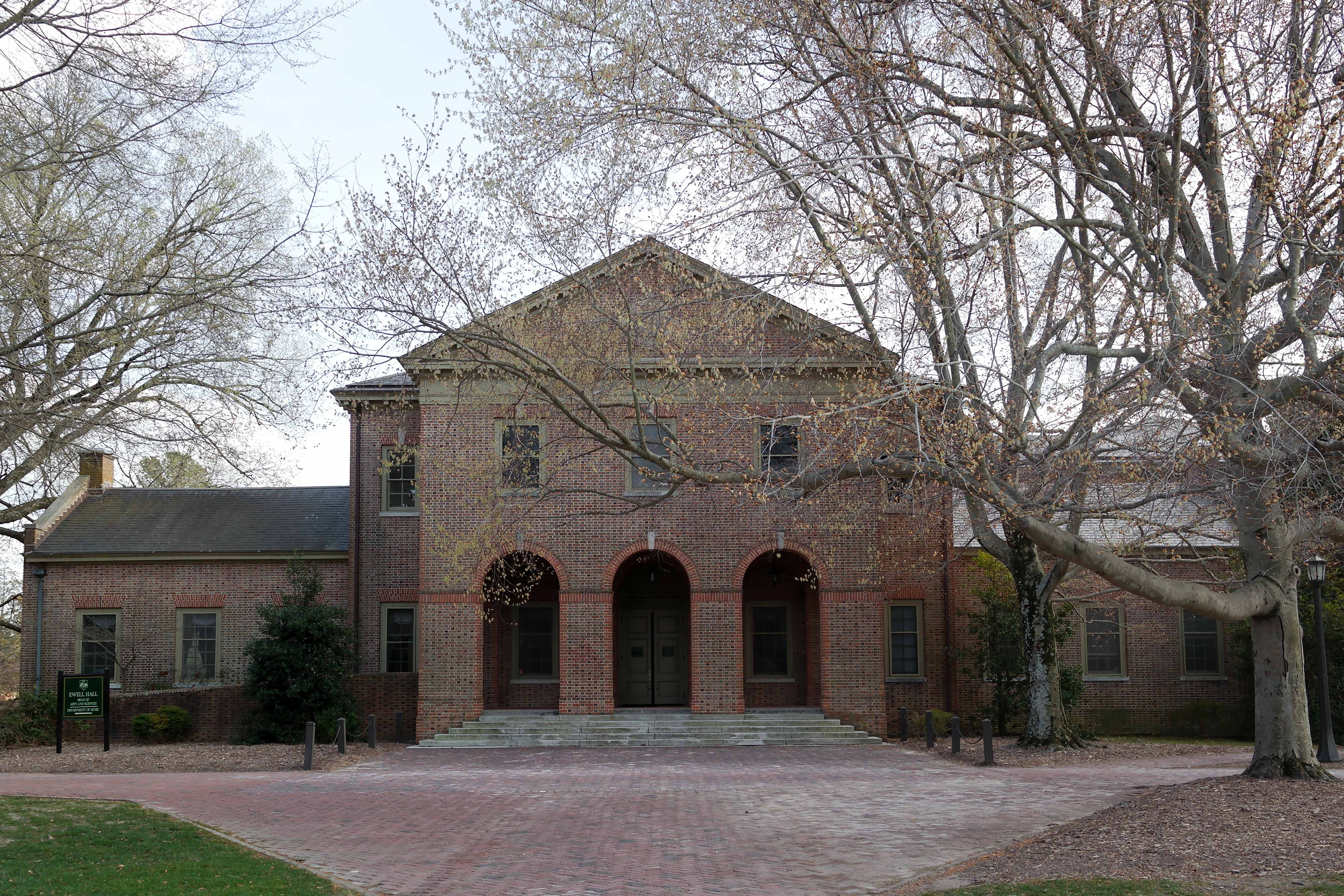
Arcaded front of Ewell Hall, pictured in 2015

Ewell Hall sits in an area now known as Old Campus across the later-built Sunken Garden from Tucker Hall. The buildings in this portion of the college's campus were largely designed by architect Charles M. Robinson on landscaping designed by Charles Gillette; the hall is one of only three buildings in this portion of the campus not designed by Robinson. Instead, it was designed by John Kevan Peebles and Finlay Forbes Ferguson. The original building included a reconstruction of the Apollo Room of the Raleigh Tavern, the original meeting space of the Phi Beta Kappa Society, measuring 24 feet by 32 feet.

Prior to the construction of the now-Ewell Hall and its auditorium, the Wren Building's chapel was where the college's theater productions were staged. The 1926 auditorium was 64 feet by 90 feet. Dressing rooms and a large storage room were located under the auditorium. In 1932, a sound film theater opened in the auditorium. A radio station studio was added in 1938 and space was converted to women's dorms in 1941. Rockefeller provided funding for the reconstruction of the building following the 1953 fire. In 1955, the Music Department began occupying the building's north wing. The C. L. Lewis & Company was contracted for $220,750 (equivalent to $2,530,517 in 2025) to build a new auditorium for Ewell Hall in 1957; this was completed in 1958. A 154-seat recital hall and other spaces were added to Ewell Hall in 1988.
