= Bonneville Expedition =

The Bonneville Expedition may refer to:

- Bonneville Expedition of 1832, an expedition of Oregon Country
- Bonneville Expedition of 1857, American military operation during the Apache Wars
