= Joseph Kraft =

American journalist

Joseph Kraft (September 4, 1924 – January 10, 1986) was an American journalist.

== Career ==
Kraft began his career in journalism at the age of 14, when he worked as a stringer covering high school sports for the New York World-Telegram. Kraft worked for the Los Angeles Times and Los Angeles Syndicate after July 1980, where he covered foreign affairs and national security. After working at The Washington Post and The New York Times in the 1950s, he became a speechwriter for 1960 Presidential candidate John F. Kennedy. His work landed him on the master list of Nixon political opponents. He served as one of three panelists for the third and final debate, held at Phi Beta Kappa Memorial Hall at the College of William & Mary, in the 1976 presidential election. Kraft was viewed as one of America's foremost analysts of domestic and international affairs. His syndicated column ran in over 200 papers.

== Education ==
Kraft was a graduate of Columbia University. He also attended the Institute for Advanced Study at Princeton and the Sorbonne.

== Personal life ==
Kraft died on January 10, 1986, by heart failure at the age of 61. His brother, Gilman Kraft, was a publisher who was the owner of Playbill.

== Publications ==
Kraft was the author of four books:

- The Struggle for Algeria (1961)
- The Grand Design (1962)
- Profiles in Power (1966)
- The Chinese Difference (1973)

He also wrote an extraordinary journalistic account of the explosion of Mexico's debt crisis in 1982:

- The Mexican Rescue (1984)

== Sources ==
- McFadden, Robert D. (January 11, 1986). "Joseph Kraft, Capital Columnist Whose Work Ran in 200 Papers". The New York Times.
- Rosenblatt, Roger (January 27, 1986). "The Death of a Columnist". Time.
- Staff report (February 3, 1986). "Joseph Kraft, 1924–1986". (obituary). The New Republic.
