= Tucker Hall =

Academic hall in Virginia, US

St. George Tucker Hall
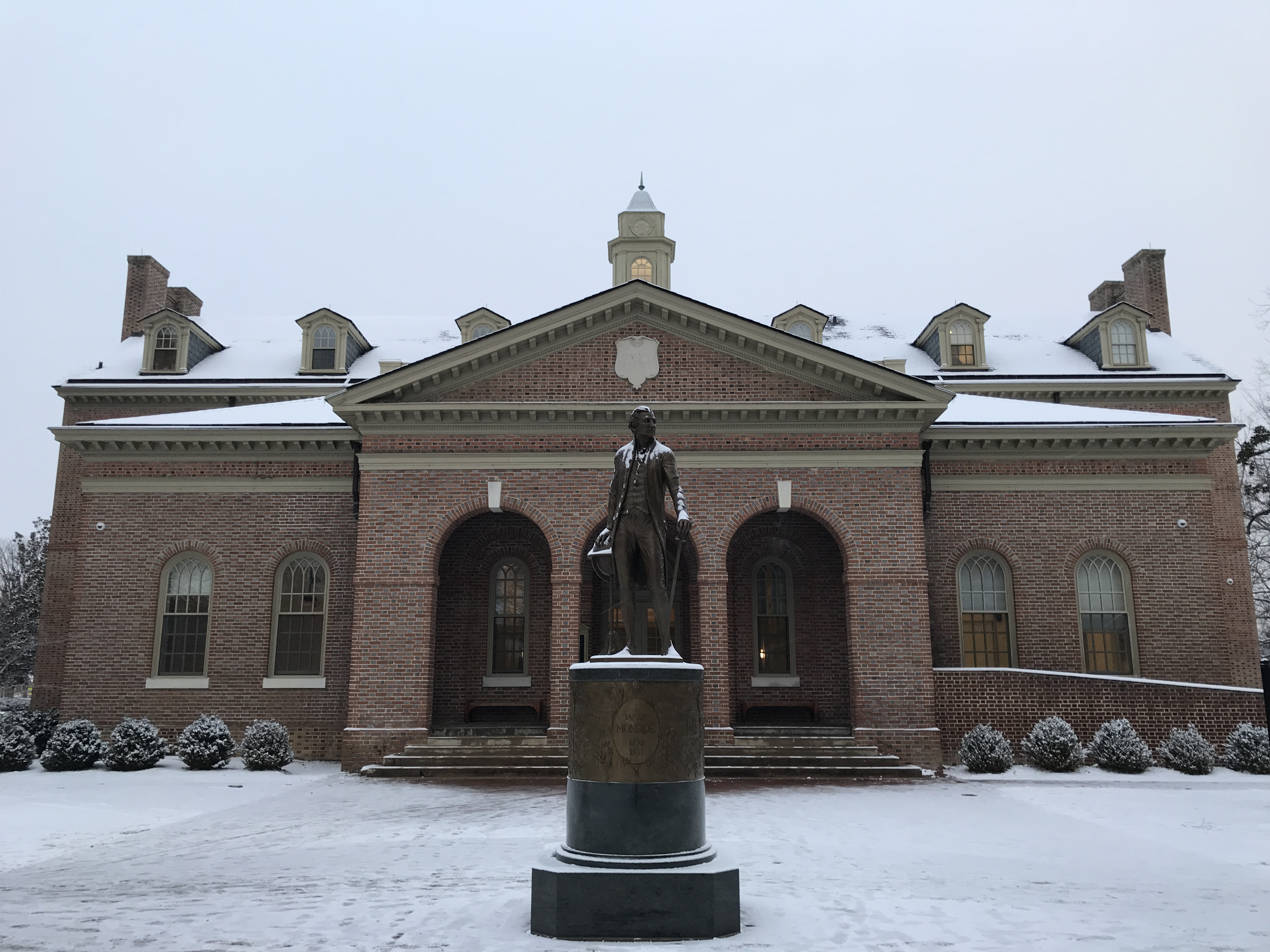
- Tucker Hall and Monroe statue, 2018
- Interactive map of the St. George Tucker Hall area

General information
- Architectural style: Colonial Revival
- Coordinates: 37°16′17″N 76°42′36″W
- Year built: 1908–1909
- Inaugurated: May 14, 1909
- Renovated: 1928, 2013
- Cost: $14,297 (construction, 1908)
- Owner: College of William & Mary

Design and construction
- Architects: Cady & See (1908–1909), Charles M. Robinson (1928)

St. George Tucker Hall is an academic building on the campus of the College of William & Mary in Williamsburg, Virginia. Built in 1908–1909 from a design by Cady & See, it was William & Mary's first freestanding library and sits on what is now known as Old Campus. It is an early example of Colonial Revival architecture in Williamsburg that predated the Colonial Williamsburg restoration and reconstruction efforts. A 1928 expansion of Tucker Hall was designed by Charles M. Robinson, with a further renovation performed in 2009. The building is now named for St. George Tucker, who taught at the college. A statue of James Monroe, a U.S. president and alumnus of the college, was installed in front the hall in 2015.

== Design and history ==
Lyon Gardiner Tyler, the president of the College of William & Mary, raised $20,000 (equivalent to $716,667 in 2025), which made William & Mary eligible for a matching donation from the Carnegie Foundation to construct a library. This fundraising was part of Tyler's broader campaign to further develop and expand William & Mary's campus to accommodate the college's increasing number of groups. It would be the college's first free-standing library; previously, the library had been housed in the Wren Building.

Colonial Revival architecture arrived at the college with the construction of the now-demolished first Taliaferro Hall in a style akin to the nearby Brafferton in 1894; the new library would follow this styling. Designed by architects of Cady & See and emulating the architecture of 18th-century Virginia courthouses, the cornerstone of the library building was laid on April 13, 1908, during a ceremony attended by Governor Claude A. Swanson. The accepted construction bid was for $14,297 (equivalent to $512,309 in 2025). The building was dedicated on May 14, 1909. This initial construction lacked a cupola. The brick building's initial interior layout of the building was in a T-shape inside an 80 ft by 30 ft frame.

An expansion was designed by Charles M. Robinson, who also designed the adjacent Sunken Garden and many of the other buildings that were installed on what is now Old Campus, and completed in 1928. Ewell Hall was opened in 1926 on the site now opposite Tucker Hall along the Sunken Garden. By the time of a fire at a neighboring hall in 1930, a cupola was visible atop the library building. This redesign laid the building out in an H-shape.

Renamed for St. George Tucker in 1980, the hall now serves as the home for the college's English Department. It was renovated in 2013. The involvement of St. George Tucker and his son Nathaniel Beverley Tucker–who, like his father, was a professor at the college–in slavery in Virginia led to archaeologist Ywone D. Edwards-Ingram proposing the hall as a possible location for an exhibit on both men's legacies. A bronze statue by Gordon Kay of U.S. president and college alumnus James Monroe was installed in front of Tucker Hall in 2015. The statue's granite base features bronze reliefs. The statue was vandalized in 2018 with graffiti saying "slave owner".
