= Gilman Kraft =

American publisher

Gilman Kraft (April 22, 1926 – June 27, 1999) was an American publisher and former owner of Playbill.

== Biography ==
Kraft was born in Union City, New Jersey on April 22, 1926. During World War II, he served as a Japanese linguist. After graduating from Columbia College in 1947, he founded the Reader's Subscription book club in 1951, and hired Lionel Trilling, Jacques Barzun, and W. H. Auden as editors.

In 1957, Kraft took over the then-flagging Broadway program service Playbill and operated it for ten years. He was also publisher of Show magazine in 1965 and 1966. He then moved to Los Angeles to found Performing Arts in 1966, while also investing in commercial and residential real estate. The magazine he founded provides printed programs for the Los Angeles County Music Center, the Orange County Performing Arts Center, San Francisco Opera and Ballet, the Pasadena Playhouse and more than 40 other venues in California.

== Personal life ==
Kraft was married to Ruth Kraft. He died on June 27, 1999, in Beverly Hills, California at age 73. His brother is the syndicated columnist Joseph Kraft, whose work landed him on the master list of Nixon's political opponents.
