= Benjamin Stoddert Ewell =

American engineer and educator

16th President of the College of William & Mary
- In office 1854–1888
- Preceded by: John Johns
- Succeeded by: Lyon Gardiner Tyler

Personal details
- Born: June 10, 1810 Washington, D.C., US
- Died: June 19, 1894 (aged 84) Williamsburg, Virginia, US
- Resting place: College of William and Mary Cemetery, Williamsburg
- Relations: Richard S. Ewell (brother)
- Education: United States Military Academy

Military service
- Allegiance: United States of America; Confederate States of America
- Branch/service: United States Army; Confederate States Army
- Years of service: 1832–36 (USA); 1861–65 (CSA)
- Rank: 2nd Lieutenant (USA); Colonel (CSA)
- Commands: 32nd Virginia Infantry
- Battles/wars: American Civil War

Benjamin Stoddert Ewell (June 10, 1810 – June 19, 1894) was a United States and Confederate army officer, civil engineer, and educator from James City County, Virginia. He graduated from the U.S. Military Academy at West Point, New York in 1832 and served as an officer and educator.

Although he personally did not favor secession of Virginia from the Union, at the outset of the American Civil War (1861–1865), he helped form local militia in the Peninsula region of Hampton Roads. His work designing and constructing the Williamsburg Line of defensive works of the city and Fort Magruder at its center was a factor in delaying Federal troops attempting to chase retreating Confederates during the Peninsula Campaign, a failed attempt to capture the capital city of Richmond in 1862. His younger brother was Confederate General Richard S. Ewell, a senior commander under Stonewall Jackson and Robert E. Lee.

Benjamin Ewell is best remembered for his long tenure as the sixteenth president of the College of William and Mary in Williamsburg before, during and after the American Civil War. Benjamin Ewell's tireless efforts to restore the historic school and its programs during and after Reconstruction became legendary in Williamsburg and at the college and were ultimately successful, with funding from both the U.S. Congress and the Commonwealth of Virginia.

== Youth, education, early career ==
Benjamin Stoddert Ewell was born in the Georgetown section of Washington, D.C. He was the son of Dr. Thomas Ewell and his wife Elizabeth Stoddert Ewell, and was a grandson of Benjamin Stoddert, first U.S. Secretary of the Navy.

He graduated from the United States Military Academy at West Point, New York, in 1832, and assigned to the Fourth Artillery of the U.S. Army. However, Ewell stayed on as an assistant professor of mathematics at West Point from 1832 to 1835, and assistant professor of natural and experimental philosophy there in 1835 and 1836.

In 1836, he left West Point and became an assistant engineer of the Baltimore and Susquehanna Railroad, connecting Baltimore, Maryland with Sunbury, Pennsylvania, from 1836 until 1839.

Moving to Virginia in 1839, at Hampden–Sydney College, he became professor of mathematics, serving from 1839 to 1842 and of mathematics and natural philosophy from 1842 to 1846. He then moved to Lexington, Virginia, where he was professor of mathematics and military science at Washington College (which later became Washington and Lee University) from 1846 to 1848.

In 1848, he accepted a position as professor of mathematics and acting president of the College of William and Mary in Williamsburg, Virginia. He purchased a farm in nearby James City County west of the old colonial capital city along the Richmond-Williamsburg Stage Road (now U.S. Route 60) and built a large plantation house there which became known as Ewell Hall. He was later named permanent president, and served in that capacity between 1854 and 1888, even between 1861 and 1865 when the college was in abeyance.

== American Civil War ==
In 1861, he became captain of the college militia. Enlistments in the Confederate States Army depleted the student body, and on May 10, 1861, the faculty voted to close the college for the duration of the conflict. The College Building was used as a Confederate barracks and later as a hospital, first by Confederate, and later Union forces.

Ewell had employed thirteen slaves in 1860, but considered secession both unconstitutional and imprudent. However, during the American Civil War, he joined the regular forces. The 32nd Virginia Infantry was accepted into Confederate service on July 1, 1861, after it had been formed for local defense at Hampton by Ewell from several local militia units from Elizabeth City County, Warwick County, York County, and James City County. He was commissioned as a colonel in the Confederate Army. In 1861 and 1862, under General John B. Magruder and the Army of the Peninsula, Ewell had the primary responsibility for developing and constructing the Williamsburg Line, a line of defensive fortifications across the Virginia Peninsula east of Williamsburg anchored by College Creek a tributary of the James River on the south and Queen's Creek, a tributary of the York River on the north. A series of 14 redoubts were built along the line, with the earthen Fort Magruder at the junction of the two main loads leading from the lower Peninsula to the east, the Williamsburg-Yorktown Road, and the Lee's Mill Road. Slaves and freemen in the area were impressed to help build the earthworks under Ewell's order.

Following the Battle of Williamsburg on May 5, 1862, during the Peninsula Campaign, with 3,800 Confederate and Union casualties, Williamsburg and the College of William and Mary were occupied by the Union Army. The Brafferton building of the college was used for a time as quarters for the commanding officer of the Union garrison occupying the town. On September 9, 1862, drunken soldiers of the 5th Pennsylvania Cavalry set fire to the college building, purportedly in an attempt to prevent Confederate snipers from using it for cover. Much damage was done to the community during the Union occupation, which lasted until September 1865.

After the Battle of Williamsburg, Ewell left the 32nd Virginia Infantry to join the staff of General Joseph E. Johnston. He was later adjutant to his younger brother, General Richard S. Ewell, who was a senior commander under Stonewall Jackson and Robert E. Lee.

== Post-war: Restoration of the College of William and Mary ==
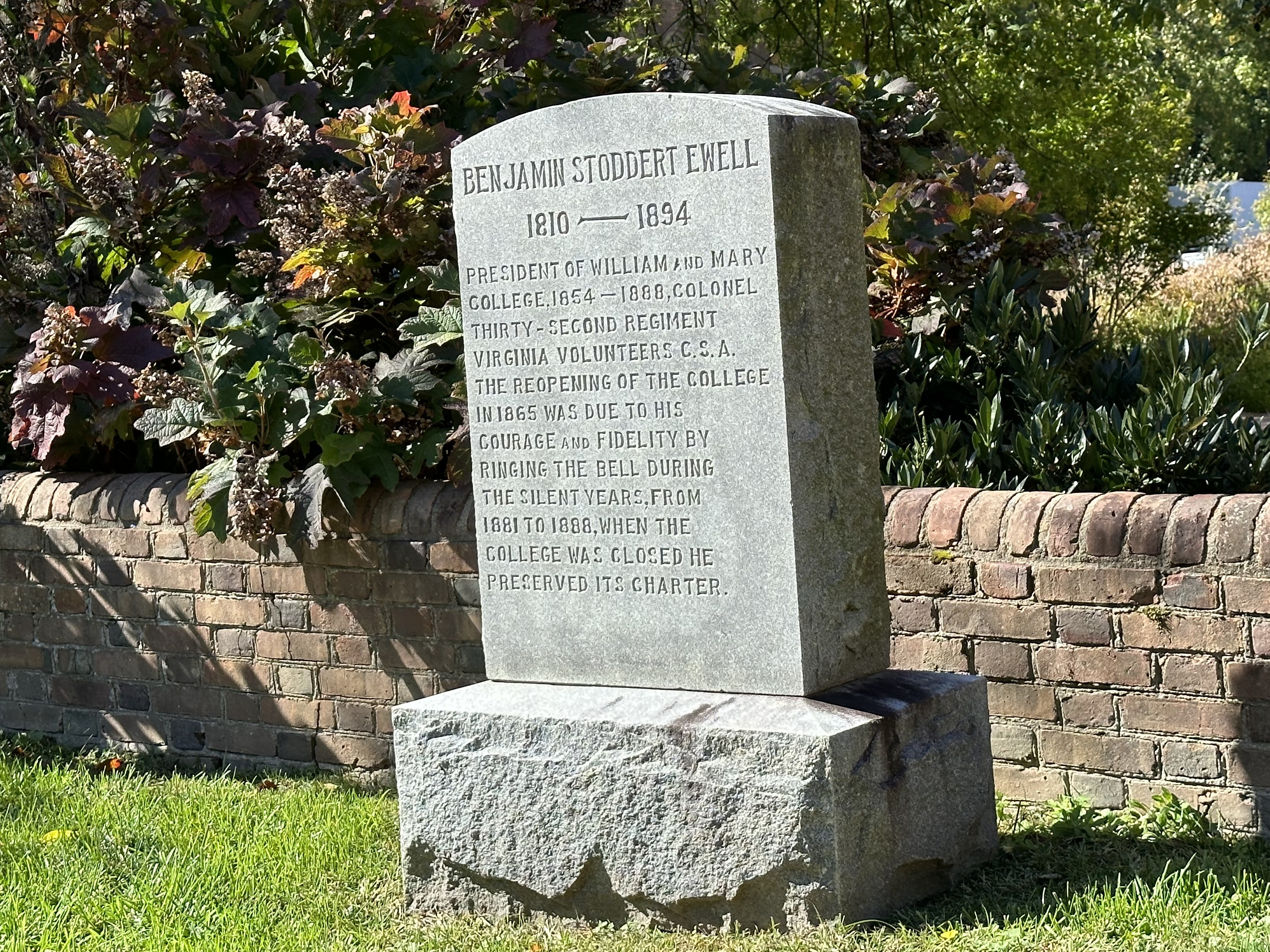
Ewell's grave on the college campus

After the war, the college and its building lay in ruins, and the Virginia economy was destitute. Ewell went to Washington, D.C., and unsuccessfully sought reparations from the U.S. Congress, speaking there several times in an attempt to secure appropriations for the college for damages incurred during the War. Some payment was finally made by the U.S. Government, but not until 1893.

Ewell supported black suffrage as early as November 1865, worked to help schools for black students, and endorsed both the 14th Amendment and President Ulysses S. Grant, earning criticism from other Virginians.

In 1869, Ewell finally reopened the school with his own personal funds and became president of the College of William and Mary again. He mortgaged his family farm, purchased nearby in 1858, which was lost to foreclosure and an auction sale. Despite Ewell's efforts, the college was forced to close again for financial reasons in 1881, and did not reopen until 1888.

It became well-known at the college and in the Williamsburg community that, every single morning during that seven-year period, Benjamin Stoddert Ewell would arise and ring the bell calling students to class. As such, William and Mary continued its mission to educate the young men of Virginia.

In 1888, William & Mary resumed operations under a substitute charter when the Virginia General Assembly passed a bill appropriating $10,000 to support the college as a state teacher-training institution. Once he had ensured that the college he had cherished and protected would survive, the 71-year-old Ewell relinquished the presidency and retired. Lyon Gardiner Tyler (son of US president and alumnus John Tyler) became the 17th president of the college following President Ewell's retirement.

Benjamin Ewell remained in Williamsburg as president emeritus of the college until his death on June 19, 1894. He was interred in the College of William and Mary Cemetery in Williamsburg. Both his personal papers and papers relating to his service as president of the College of William and Mary can be found at the Special Collections Research Center at the College of William and Mary.

== Legacy ==
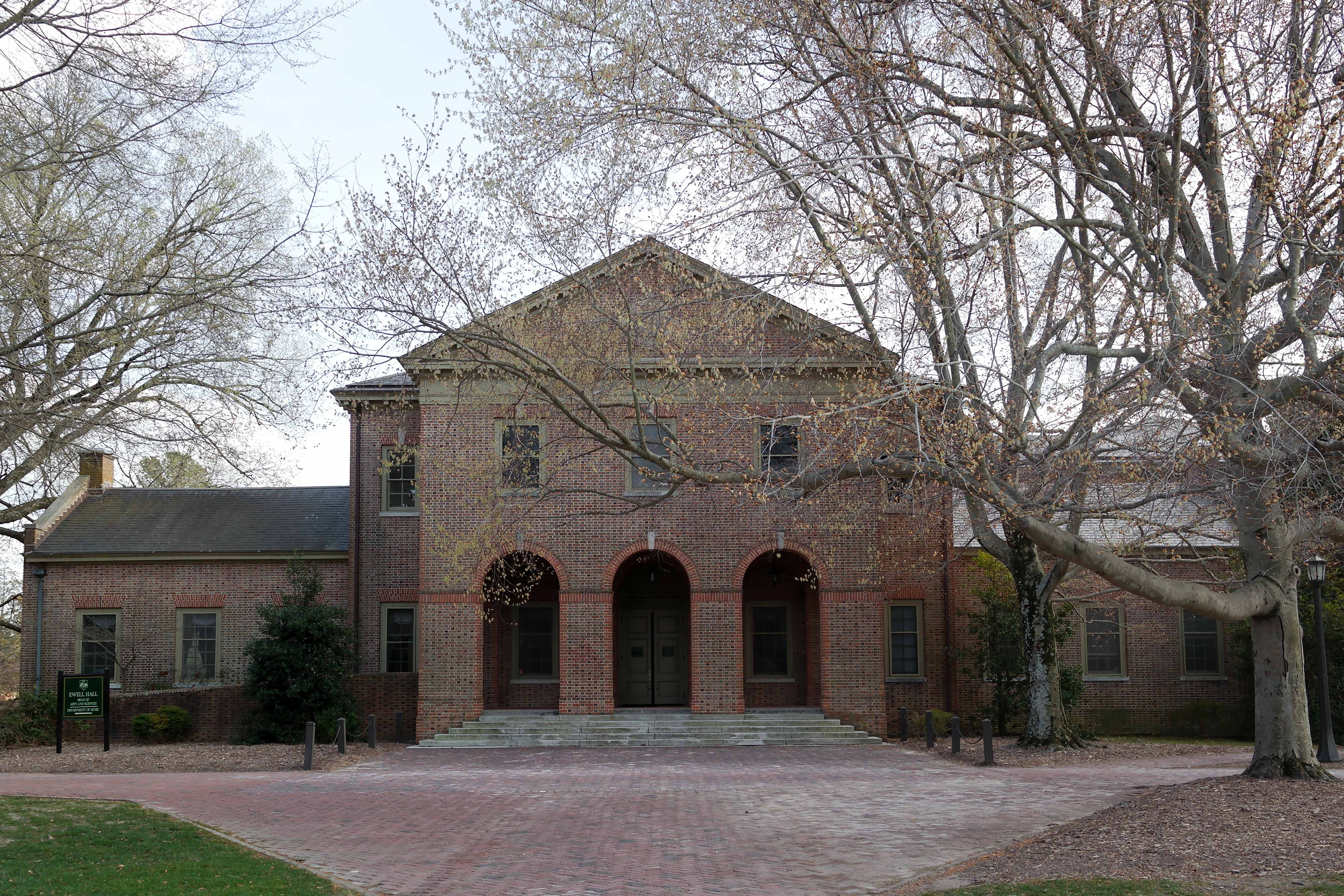
Ewell Hall on the campus of the College of William & Mary

- The unincorporated community of Ewell in James City County and Ewell Station located along the Peninsula Extension of the Chesapeake and Ohio Railway (C&O) which was built through the area in 1881 by Collis P. Huntington, were named for him.
- Ewell Hall, the historic plantation house he built at the former Ewell Farm eventually became the restored centerpiece of a cemetery, Williamsburg Memorial Park, between Williamsburg and Lightfoot in James City County.
- Ewell Hall on the Old Campus of the College of William and Mary is named for him.
- In 1987, the Student Association of the College of William and Mary established an award in his honor.
