= Bonneville Expedition (1857) =

Part of the Apache Wars

- Part of the Apache Wars
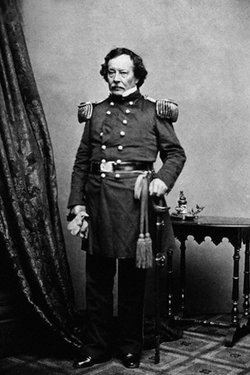
- General Benjamin Bonneveille, circa 1861.
Date	May – July 1857
Location	New Mexico and Arizona
Result	United States victory

Belligerents
United States	Apache

Commanders and leaders
(United States) Benjamin Bonneville	Black Knife †

Strength
~800	Unknown

Casualties and losses
2 killed 7 wounded	~50 killed or wounded 54 captured

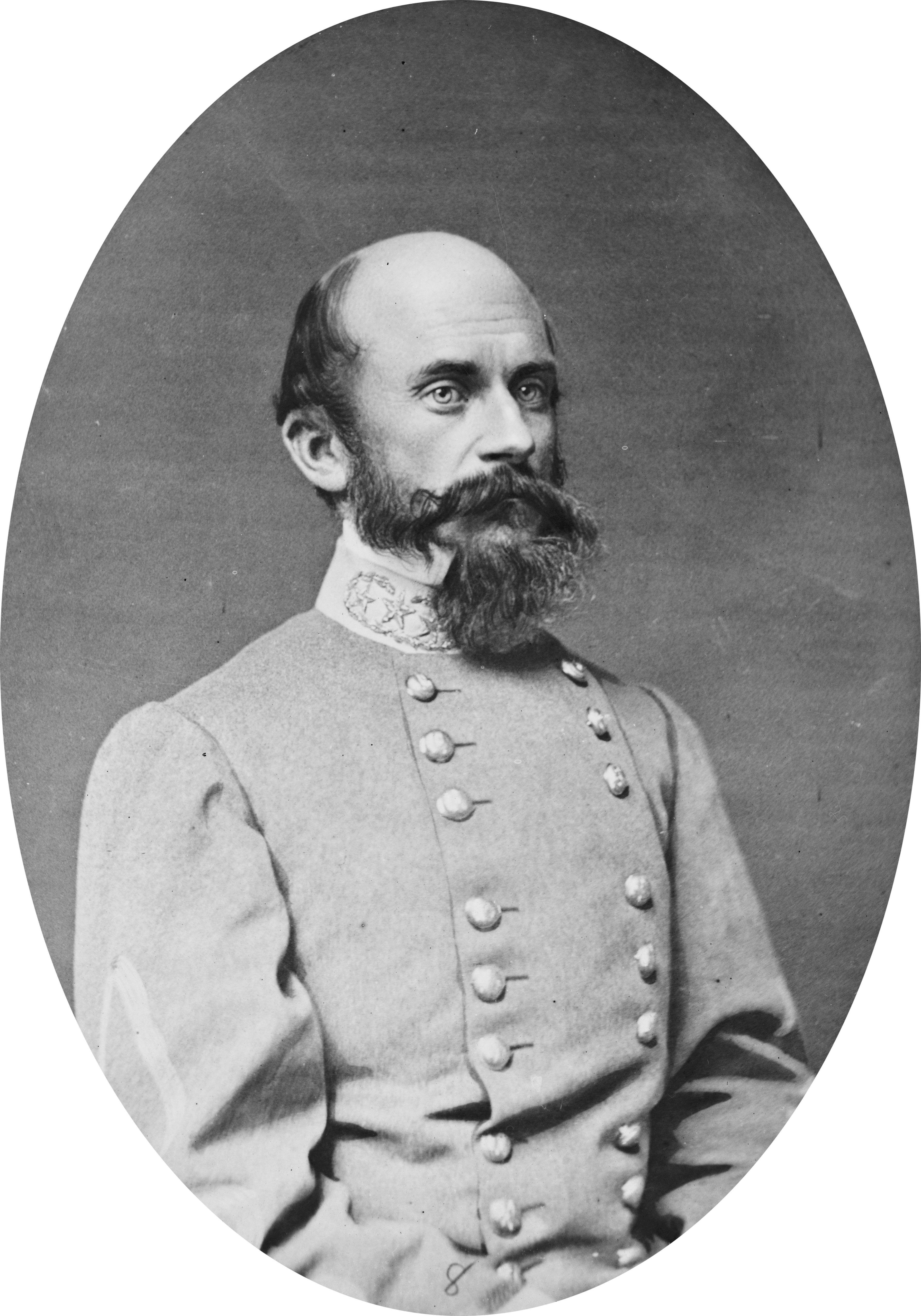
Richard Ewell during the American Civil War

The Bonneville Expedition was a military operation launched by the United States Army in 1857 at the beginning of the Chiricahua Apache Wars. Colonel Benjamin Bonneville, Lieutenant Colonel Dixon S. Miles, and Colonel William W. Loring commanded parties which headed west from Fort Fillmore, New Mexico Territory. The expedition quickly engaged Apaches in two small but significant battles, the first in the Black Range and the second along the Gila River near present-day Safford, Arizona.

== Expedition ==
In late May 1857, responding to the threat from constant Apache raids, Colonel Bonneville organized a two-pronged expedition into Apacheria. Hundreds of troops assembled at Fort Fillmore and Albuquerque. Colonel Loring commanded the northern column, which left from Albuquerque for the Mogollon Mountains, while Miles commanded the southern column, which would advance west along the Gila. Bonneville accompanied the southern column, but Miles was in command. Altogether about 800 infantry, cavalry and Pueblo Scouts were involved, 600 of whom were part of Mile's column.

Loring's command was the first to make contact with the enemy. Chief Black Knife and his band were in the area with 2,000 head of stolen sheep. On May 24, Loring's force caught up with the Apaches in the Black Range near the Mogollons after pursuing them for days. At a little rocky valley the Apaches were attacked and defeated at their camp. Seven warriors were killed and left on the field while the rest fled into the mountains. Chief Black Knife was one of the killed; nine others were captured and all of the livestock was recaptured. There were no American casualties in the engagement.

The southern column had to wait longer for an engagement. They moved slower than Colonel Loring's men partly because Bonneville split his force in two and marched it in tight configuration on both sides of the river. This tactic made many of Bonneville's officers believe they would have no chance of catching up with any Apaches. Captain Richard S. Ewell commanded the right wing of about 300 men, which was the only part of the column to fight a battle. On June 27, more than a month after the start of the expedition, Ewell and his men came across a rancheria east of Mount Graham, on the Gila River. Ewell wasted no time in waiting for the left wing so he and his men hastily advanced into the Apache camp and killed or wounded about 40 warriors in a short engagement before Bonneville or Miles could arrive. Forty-five women and children were also captured. Two American officers were killed, and seven enlisted men were wounded. One of the killed Apaches was believed to have been responsible for the death of Indian agent Henry I. Dodge.
