= Robert Munford III =

American poet (1737–1783)

Robert Munford III (1737-1783) was an American playwright, civic leader and soldier, having served under Colonel George Washington in the French and Indian War and later serving in the Revolutionary War.

== Biography ==
Munford was the son of Robert Munford II and his wife Anna Beverley Munford. Munford hailed from Mecklenburg County, Virginia where he was an influential land owner and served on the first county government which formed there in 1765. He is best known, however, for his literary works as he is regarded to be the author of the first comedic plays written in America, The Candidates (ca. 1770) and The Patriots (ca. 1777). He also wrote a handful of poems, and left at his death an incomplete translation of the Metamorphoses of Ovid. No record survives of any public performance of either play, although it is possible that they may have been shown privately.

Munford is currently buried near the site of his homestead, most of which currently rests below John H. Kerr Reservoir near Boydton, Virginia. His gravestone can be viewed along the Robert Munford Hiking Trail, which is owned and managed by the U.S. Army Corps of Engineers.

One of Munford's poems was published in 1779, but much of his work remained unseen by the public before his death. In 1798 his son published a volume containing both plays, a handful of poems, and the first book of Metamorphoses.
