= Phi Beta Kappa Memorial Hall =

College building in Virginia, US

Coordinates: 37.268377°N 76.715287°W

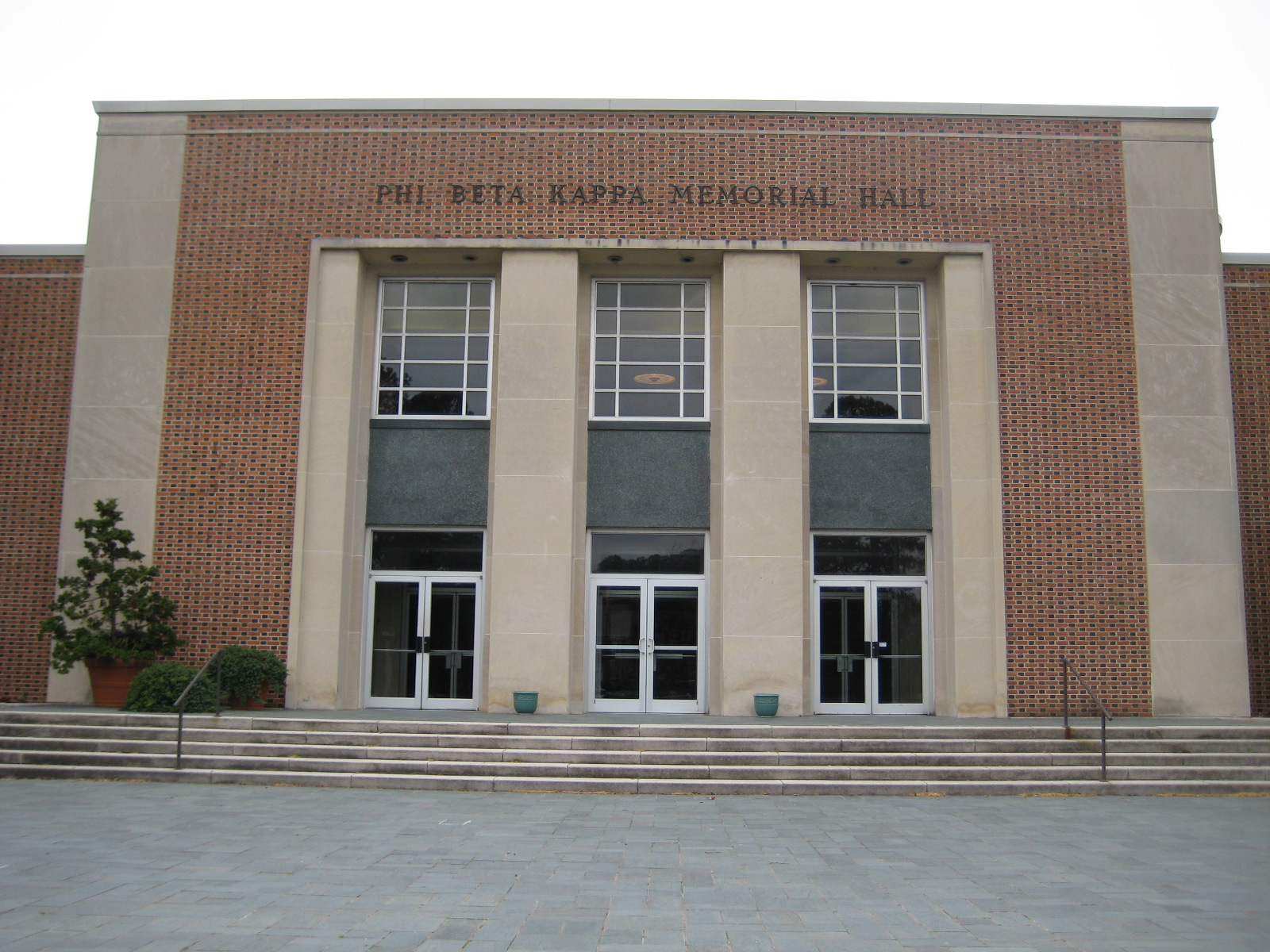
Former Phi Beta Kappa Memorial Hall entrance at The College of William & Mary.

Phi Beta Kappa Memorial Hall is a multi-use building on the campus of the College of William & Mary in Williamsburg, Virginia, United States. It contains the largest auditorium on the campus, containing two floors of seating. The building is home to art shows, musical acts, theatre, assemblies and guest speakers.

== History ==
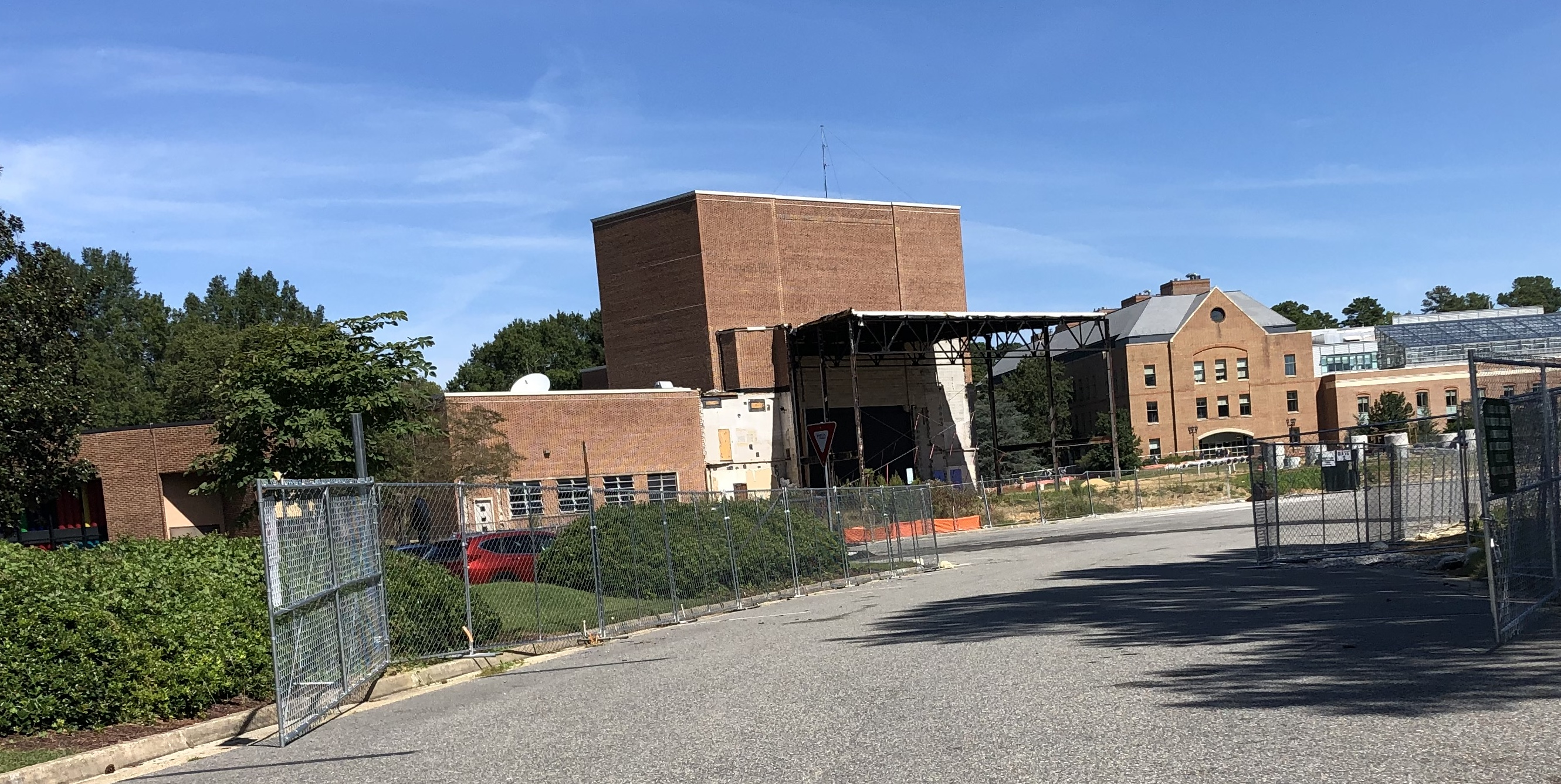
Phi Beta Kappa Memorial Hall after demolitions were halted due to budgetary issues, September 2019

In 1957, Phi Beta Kappa Memorial Hall opened its doors and became the first building on the College’s "new campus." PBK Hall was originally in a different building on campus but had burned down in a fire in 1953. The name comes from Phi Beta Kappa society, which was the first academic honor society created in the United States. It was founded at the College in 1776.

=== 1976 presidential debate ===
Phi Beta Kappa Memorial Hall was the site of the third and final presidential debate between candidates Jimmy Carter (D) and Gerald Ford (R) in the 1976 Presidential election. The debate occurred on October 22 and was moderated by Barbara Walters. Panelists included journalist Joseph Kraft, Los Angeles Times reporter Jack Nelson, and Washington Post reporter Robert Maynard.

=== Demolition and renovation ===
In 2019, the aging building began demolitions, with much of the brick and concrete construction being removed by the end of the summer. However, budgetary constraints forced the halt of the demolitions, leaving portions of the steel super-structure still visible. The continuation of the demolition and the construction of the new fine and performing arts center was delayed until early summer 2020 while awaiting state funding. The original completion date was scheduled for 2021. In August 2023, Theatre, Dance, and Music department classes moved into the newly-opened buildings, opening its main stage theatre with an inaugural performance of Nine by the Leah Glenn Dance Theatre the subsequent month. The official dedication of the building took place on October 19, 2023. The ceremony was presided over by Glenn Close, during which the main stage theater was named in her honor.
