= Thomas Jefferson =

Founding Father, U.S. president from 1801 to 1809

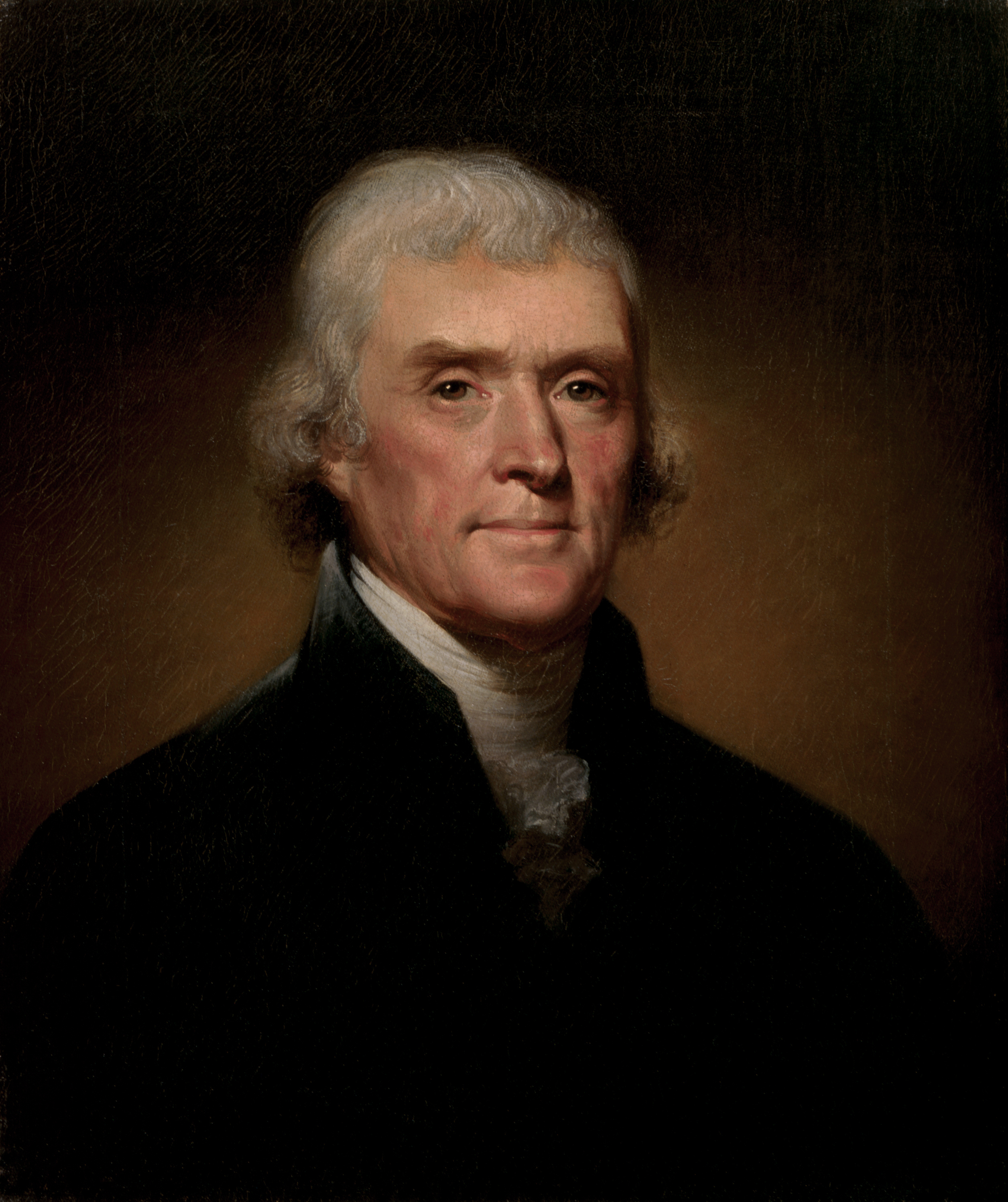
- Portrait, 1800

3rd President of the United States
- In office March 4, 1801 – March 4, 1809
- Vice President: Aaron Burr (1801–1805); George Clinton (1805–1809)
- Preceded by: John Adams
- Succeeded by: James Madison

2nd Vice President of the United States
- In office March 4, 1797 – March 4, 1801
- President: John Adams
- Preceded by: John Adams
- Succeeded by: Aaron Burr

1st United States Secretary of State
- In office March 22, 1790 – December 31, 1793
- President: George Washington
- Preceded by: John Jay (acting)
- Succeeded by: Edmund Randolph

2nd Governor of Virginia
- In office June 1, 1779 – June 3, 1781
- Preceded by: Patrick Henry
- Succeeded by: William Fleming
Other positions
2nd United States Minister to France
In office May 17, 1785 – September 26, 1789
Appointed by	Confederation Congress
Preceded by	Benjamin Franklin
Succeeded by	William Short
Minister Plenipotentiary for Negotiating Treaties of Amity and Commerce
In office May 7, 1784 – May 11, 1786
Appointed by	Confederation Congress
Preceded by	Office established
Succeeded by	Office abolished
Delegate from Virginia to the Confederation Congress
In office June 6, 1782 – May 7, 1784
Preceded by	James Madison
Succeeded by	Richard Henry Lee
Delegate from Virginia to the Second Continental Congress
In office June 20, 1775 – September 26, 1776
Preceded by	George Washington
Succeeded by	John Harvie
Member of the Virginia House of Delegates from Albemarle County
In office October 7, 1776 – May 30, 1779
Preceded by	Charles Lewis
Succeeded by	George Gilmer
In office December 10–22, 1781
Preceded by	Isaac Davis
Succeeded by	James Marks
Member of the Virginia House of Burgesses from Albemarle County
In office May 11, 1769 – June 1, 1775
Preceded by	Edward Carter
Succeeded by	Office abolished

Personal details
- Born: April 13, 1743 Shadwell Plantation, Virginia, British America
- Died: July 4, 1826 (aged 83) Monticello, Virginia, U.S.
- Resting place: Monticello, Virginia, U.S.
- Party: Democratic-Republican
- Spouse: Martha Wayles (m. 1772; died 1782)
- Children: 6 with Martha Wayles, including: Martha Jefferson Randolph; Mary Jefferson Eppes; Up to 6 with Sally Hemings, (Note: A number of historians and geneticists argue that while DNA testing of Hemings' descendants reveals a genetic connection with a male ancestor in the Jefferson family, it does not conclusively prove that it was Jefferson himself who sired these children, leading to the Jefferson-Hemings controversy.) including: Madison Hemings; Eston Hemings
- Parents: Peter Jefferson; Jane Randolph
- Education: College of William & Mary
- Occupation: Politician; Lawyer; Book Collector

Military service
- Allegiance: United States
- Branch/service: Virginia militia
- Years of service: 1775–1776
- Rank: Colonel
- Unit: Albemarle County Militia
- Battles/wars: American Revolutionary War

Philosophical work
- Era: Age of Enlightenment
- Region: Western philosophy; American philosophy
- School: Classical liberalism; Deism
- Institutions: American Philosophical Society
- Main interests: Classical History; Theology; Philosophy; Philology; Mathematics; Engineering; Architecture; Book Collecting; Classical Music
- Notable works: Declaration of Independence (1776); Notes on Virginia (1785); Jefferson's Manual (1801); Jefferson Bible (1820)
- Notable ideas: See list: All men are created equal; Empire of Liberty; Entangling alliances; Jeffersonian democracy; Life, Liberty and the pursuit of Happiness; Natural aristocracy; Separation of church and state; Strict constructionism; Ward republic; Views on education; Views on Native Americans; Views on slavery; Views on religion

Thomas Jefferson (April 13 [O.S. April 2], 1743 – July 4, 1826) was a Founding Father and the third president of the United States, serving from 1801 to 1809. A prolific writer and philosopher, Jefferson was the primary author of the Declaration of Independence. His political philosophy formed the basis for Jeffersonian democracy, which dominated early American politics alongside federalism. Jefferson remains celebrated as an icon of American political values, but is also controversial for being a lifelong slave owner.

Born into a slave-owning family in Shadwell, Virginia, Jefferson emerged as an ideological leader of the American Revolution through his fierce advocacy for civil liberties, including the freedoms of speech, religion, and thought. He was elected to represent Virginia in the Second Continental Congress in 1775 and selected a member of the Committee of Five. Jefferson drafted the Declaration of Independence largely alone, and the document was unanimously passed by the Congress in 1776. Jefferson was appointed U.S. Minister to France in 1785 by the Confederation Congress, maintaining the American–French alliance against the British. He was appointed the first U.S. Secretary of State by President George Washington in 1790, helping administer Washington's policy of neutrality in European conflicts. Jefferson and his political ally James Madison founded the Democratic-Republican Party in 1792, centered on republicanism, individual rights, agrarianism, and limited government. Running against Federalist Party candidate John Adams in 1796, Jefferson finished with the second-highest number of votes and became Adams's vice president. He ran again in 1800, winning against Adams, and in 1804 overwhelmingly defeating the Federalists' Charles Cotesworth Pinckney of South Carolina.

Jefferson's presidency assertively defended the nation's shipping and trade interests against Barbary pirates and aggressive British trade policies, promoted a western expansionist policy with the Louisiana Purchase, which doubled the nation's geographic size, and reduced military forces and expenditures following successful negotiations with France. In his second presidential term, he was beset by difficulties at home, including the trial of his former vice president Aaron Burr. In 1807, Jefferson implemented the Embargo Act to defend the nation's industries from British threats to U.S. shipping, limit foreign trade, and stimulate the birth of American manufacturing.

Jefferson is ranked among the upper tier of U.S. presidents both by scholars and in public opinion. Presidential scholars and historians have praised Jefferson's advocacy of religious freedom and tolerance, his peaceful acquisition of the Louisiana Territory from France, and his leadership in supporting the Lewis and Clark Expedition. They acknowledge his lifelong ownership of large numbers of slaves, but offer varying interpretations of his views on and relationship with slavery.

== Early life and education ==
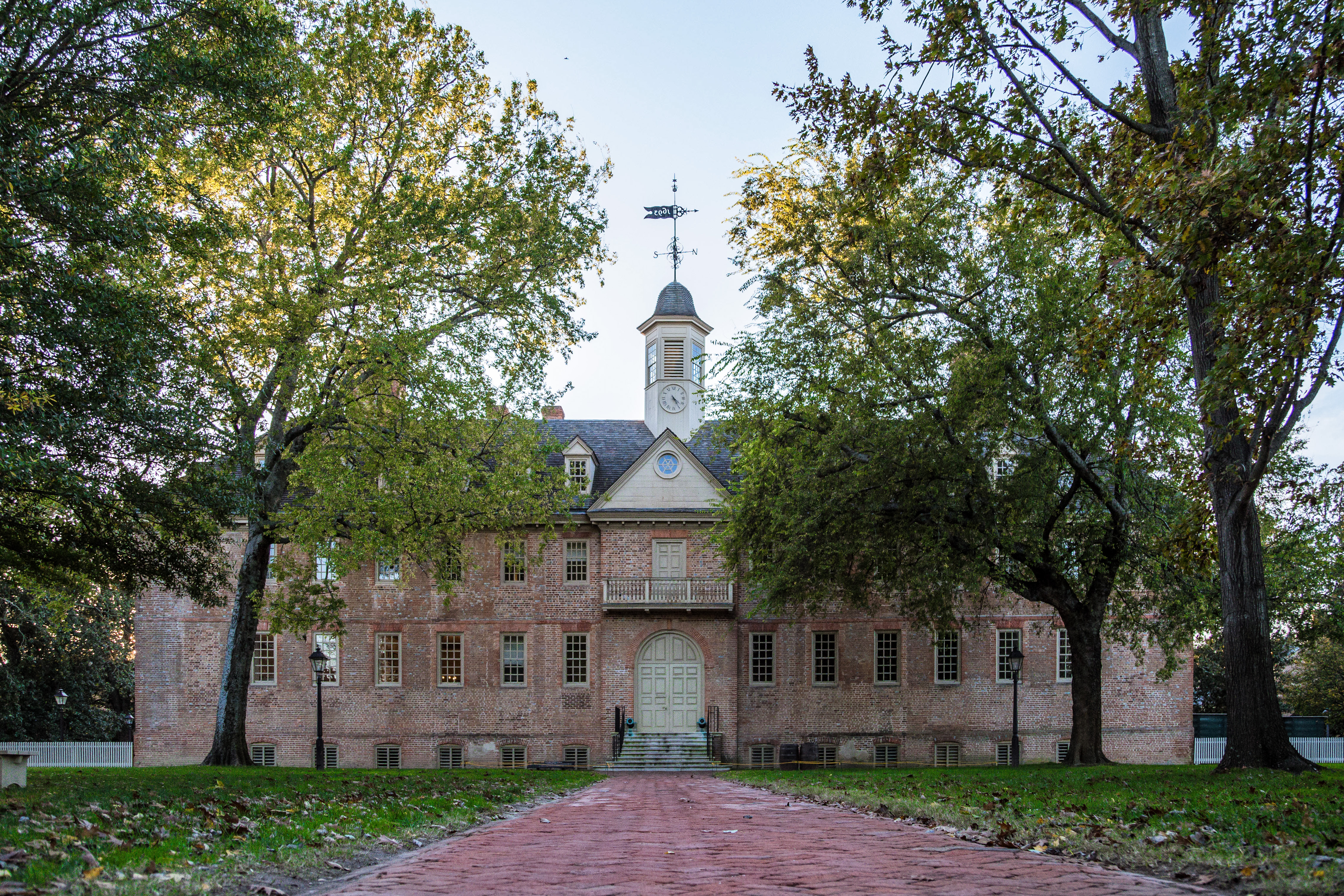
The Wren Building at the College of William & Mary in Williamsburg, where Jefferson studied in 1761 and 1762

Jefferson was born on April 13, 1743 (April 2, 1743, Old Style, Julian calendar), at the family's Shadwell Plantation in the Colony of Virginia. He was the third of ten children. His father, Peter Jefferson, was a planter and surveyor; his mother was Jane Randolph. (Note: Jefferson personally showed little interest in his ancestry; on his father's side, he only knew of the existence of his grandfather. Malone writes that Jefferson vaguely knew that his grandfather "had a place on the Fluvanna River which he called Snowden after a mountain in Wales near which the Jeffersons were supposed to have once lived". See also Peter Jefferson#Ancestry.) Peter Jefferson moved his family to Tuckahoe Plantation in 1745 following the death of William Randolph III, the plantation's owner and Jefferson's friend, who in his will had named Peter guardian of Randolph's children. The Jeffersons returned to Shadwell before October 1753.

Jefferson began his education together with the Randolph children at Tuckahoe under tutors. Thomas' father Peter, who was self-taught and regretted not having a formal education, entered Thomas into an English school at age five. In 1752, at age nine, he attended a local school run by a Presbyterian minister and also began studying the natural world, which he grew to love. He studied Latin, Greek, and French, and began learning to ride horses. Thomas read books from his father's modest library. He was taught from 1758 to 1760 by the Reverend James Maury near Gordonsville, Virginia, where he studied history, science, and the classics while boarding with Maury's family. Jefferson came to know various Native Americans including Cherokee chief Ostenaco, who often stopped at Shadwell to visit on their way to Williamsburg to trade. In Williamsburg, the young Jefferson met and came to admire Patrick Henry.

Thomas's father died in 1757, and his estate was divided between his sons, Thomas and Randolph. John Harvie Sr. became 14-year-old Thomas' guardian. Thomas inherited approximately 5,000 acres (7.8 sq mi; 20.2 km^{2}), which included the land on which he later built Monticello in 1772.

In 1761, at the age of seventeen, Jefferson entered the College of William & Mary in Williamsburg, where he studied mathematics and philosophy with William Small. Under Small's tutelage, Jefferson encountered the ideas of British empiricists, including John Locke, Francis Bacon, and Isaac Newton. Small also introduced Jefferson to George Wythe and Francis Fauquier. Small, Wythe, and Fauquier recognized Jefferson as a man of exceptional ability and included him in their inner circle, where he became a regular member of their Friday dinner parties. Jefferson later wrote that, while there, he "heard more common good sense, more rational & philosophical conversations than in all the rest of my life".

During his first year in college, Jefferson spent considerable time attending parties and dancing and was not very frugal with his expenditures; in his second year, regretting that he had squandered away time and money in his first year, he committed to studying fifteen hours a day. While at William & Mary, Jefferson became a member of the Flat Hat Club, the nation's oldest secret society, a small group whose members included St. George Tucker, Edmund Randolph, and James Innes.

Jefferson concluded his formal studies in April 1762. He read the law under Wythe's tutelage while working as a law clerk in his office. Jefferson was well-read in a broad variety of subjects, including law, philosophy, history, natural law, natural religion, ethics, and several areas of science, including astronomy and agriculture.

Jefferson kept two commonplace books: from about age 15 to 30, he compiled a book of sayings and quotations, published in the 20th century as Jefferson's Literary Commonplace Book. During his years of legal study under Wythe, Jefferson began recording his notes on law, history, and philosophy, and continued to do so until the end of his life; his Legal Commonplace Book was also published in the 20th century.

On July 20, 1765, Jefferson's sister Martha married his close friend and college companion Dabney Carr, which greatly pleased Jefferson. In October of that year, however, Jefferson's sister Jane unexpectedly died at age 25. Her death plunged Jefferson into a months-long period of mourning that was spoken of amongst the family.

Jefferson treasured his books and amassed three sizable libraries in his lifetime. He began assembling his first library, which grew to 200 volumes, in his youth. Wythe was so impressed with Jefferson that he later bequeathed his entire library to him. In 1770, however, Jefferson's first library was destroyed in a fire at his Shadwell home. His second library, which replenished the first, grew to nearly 6,500 volumes by 1814. After British forces set the Library of Congress on fire in the burning of Washington in 1814, Jefferson sold his second library to the U.S. government for $23,950, hoping to help jumpstart the Library of Congress's rebuilding. Jefferson used a portion of the proceeds to pay off some of his large debt. Jefferson soon resumed collecting his third personal library. In a letter to John Adams, Jefferson wrote, "I cannot live without books." By the time of Jefferson's death a decade later, his third and final library had grown to nearly 2,000 volumes.

== Career ==
=== Lawyer and House of Burgesses ===
In 1767, Jefferson was granted admission to the Virginia bar, and lived with his mother at Shadwell. Between 1769 and 1775, he represented Albemarle County in Virginia's House of Burgesses. While serving in the House of Burgesses, Jefferson pursued reforms to slavery, including writing and sponsoring legislation in 1769 to strip power from the royal governor and courts, instead providing masters of slaves with the discretion to emancipate them. Jefferson persuaded his cousin Richard Bland to spearhead the legislation's passage, but it faced strong opposition in a state whose economy was largely agrarian.

As a lawyer, Jefferson took on seven freedom-seeking enslaved people as clients and waived his fee for one he claimed should be freed before the minimum statutory age for emancipation. Jefferson invoked natural law, arguing "everyone comes into the world with a right to his own person and using it at his own will ... This is what is called personal liberty, and is given him by the author of nature, because it is necessary for his own sustenance." The judge cut him off and ruled against his client. As a consolation, Jefferson gave his client some money, which was conceivably used to aid his escape shortly thereafter. Jefferson's underlying intellectual argument that all people were entitled by their creator to what he labeled a "natural right" to liberty is a theme that he later prominently incorporated into the Declaration of Independence. In 1767, Jefferson took on 68 cases for the General Court of Virginia and was counsel in three notable cases of that era, Howell v. Netherland (1770), Bolling v. Bolling (1771), and Blair v. Blair (1772).

In 1774, Jefferson authored a resolution calling for a boycott of all British goods in protest of the British Parliament's passing of the Intolerable Acts. Jefferson's resolution was later expanded into A Summary View of the Rights of British America, published that year in which he argued that people have the right to govern themselves.

== Monticello, marriage, and family ==
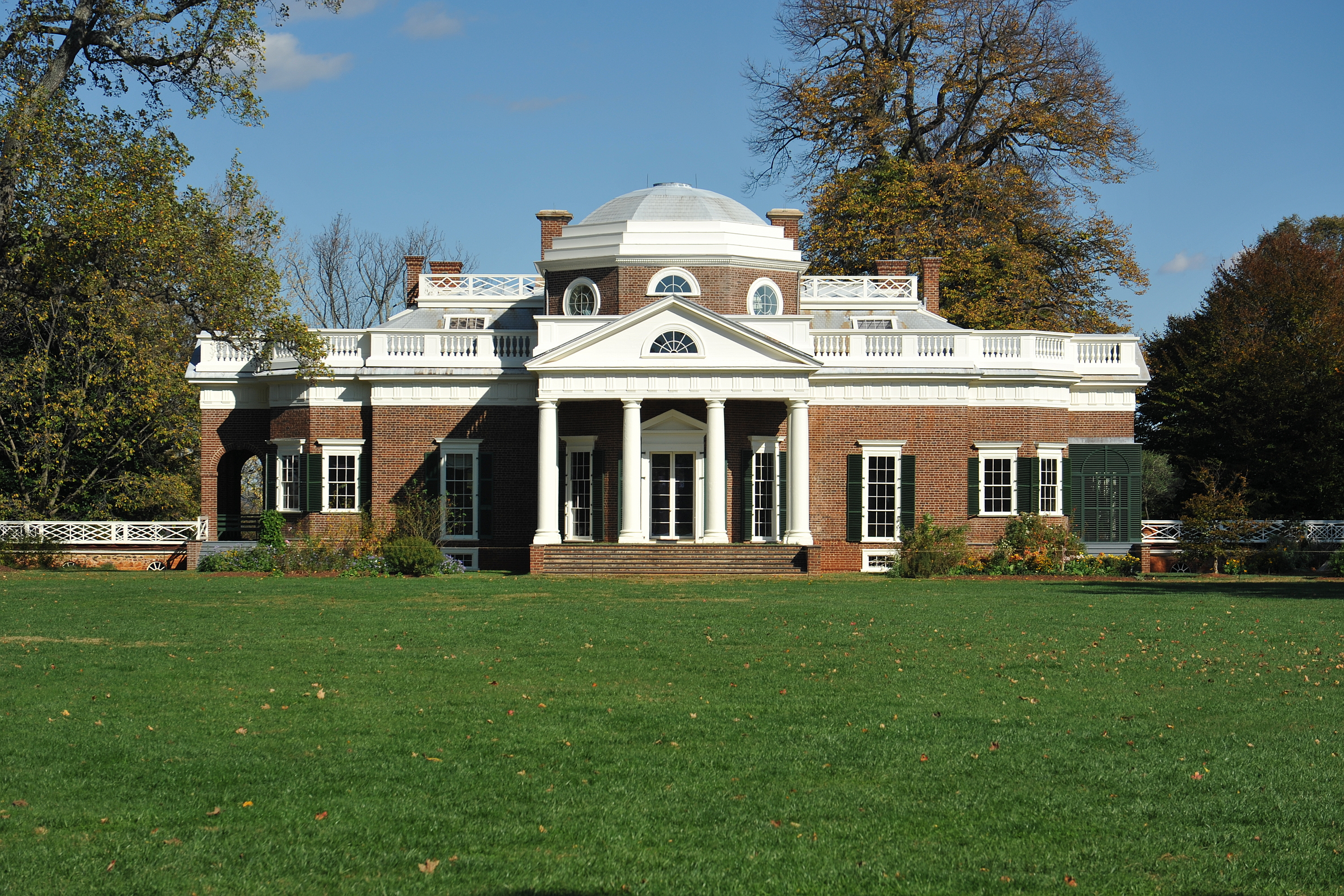
Monticello, Jefferson's home near Charlottesville, Virginia

In 1768, Jefferson began constructing his primary residence, Monticello, on a hilltop overlooking his 5,000-acre (20 km^{2}; 7.8 mi^{2}) plantation. (Note: His other properties included Shadwell, Tufton, Lego, Pantops, and his retreat, Poplar Forest. He also owned the unimproved mountaintop Montalto, and the Natural Bridge.) He spent most of his adult life designing Monticello and was quoted as saying, "Architecture is my delight, and putting up, and pulling down, one of my favorite amusements." Construction was done mostly by local masons and carpenters, assisted by Jefferson's slaves. He moved into the South Pavilion in 1770. Turning Monticello into a neoclassical masterpiece in the Palladian style became Jefferson's lifelong project.

On January 1, 1772, Jefferson married his third cousin, Martha Wayles Skelton, a 23-year-old widow of Bathurst Skelton. She was a frequent hostess for Jefferson and managed the large household. Historian Dumas Malone described the marriage as the happiest period of Jefferson's life. Martha was a skilled pianist; Jefferson often accompanied her on the violin or cello. During their ten-year marriage, Martha bore six children: Martha "Patsy" (1772–1836); Jane Randolph (1774–1775); an unnamed son who lived for only a few weeks in 1777; Mary "Polly" (1778–1804); Lucy Elizabeth (1780–1781); and another Lucy Elizabeth (1782–1784). (Note: While the news from Francis Eppes, with whom Lucy was staying, did not reach Jefferson until 1785, in an undated letter, it is clear that the year of her death was 1784 from another letter to Jefferson from James Currie dated November 20, 1784.) Only Martha and Mary survived to adulthood. Martha's father, John Wayles, died in 1773, and the couple inherited 135 enslaved people, 11,000 acres (45 km^{2}; 17 mi^{2}), and the estate's debts. The debts took Jefferson years to satisfy, contributing to his financial problems.

Martha later suffered from ill health, including diabetes, and frequent childbirth weakened her. A few months after the birth of her last child, she died on September 6, 1782, with Jefferson at her bedside. Shortly before her death, Martha made Jefferson promise never to marry again, telling him that she could not bear to have another mother raise her children. Jefferson was grief-stricken by her death, relentlessly pacing back and forth for roughly three weeks, and finally emerging to take long rambling rides on secluded roads with his daughter, Martha, who said she was "a solitary witness to many a violent burst of grief".

== Revolutionary War ==
=== Declaration of Independence ===
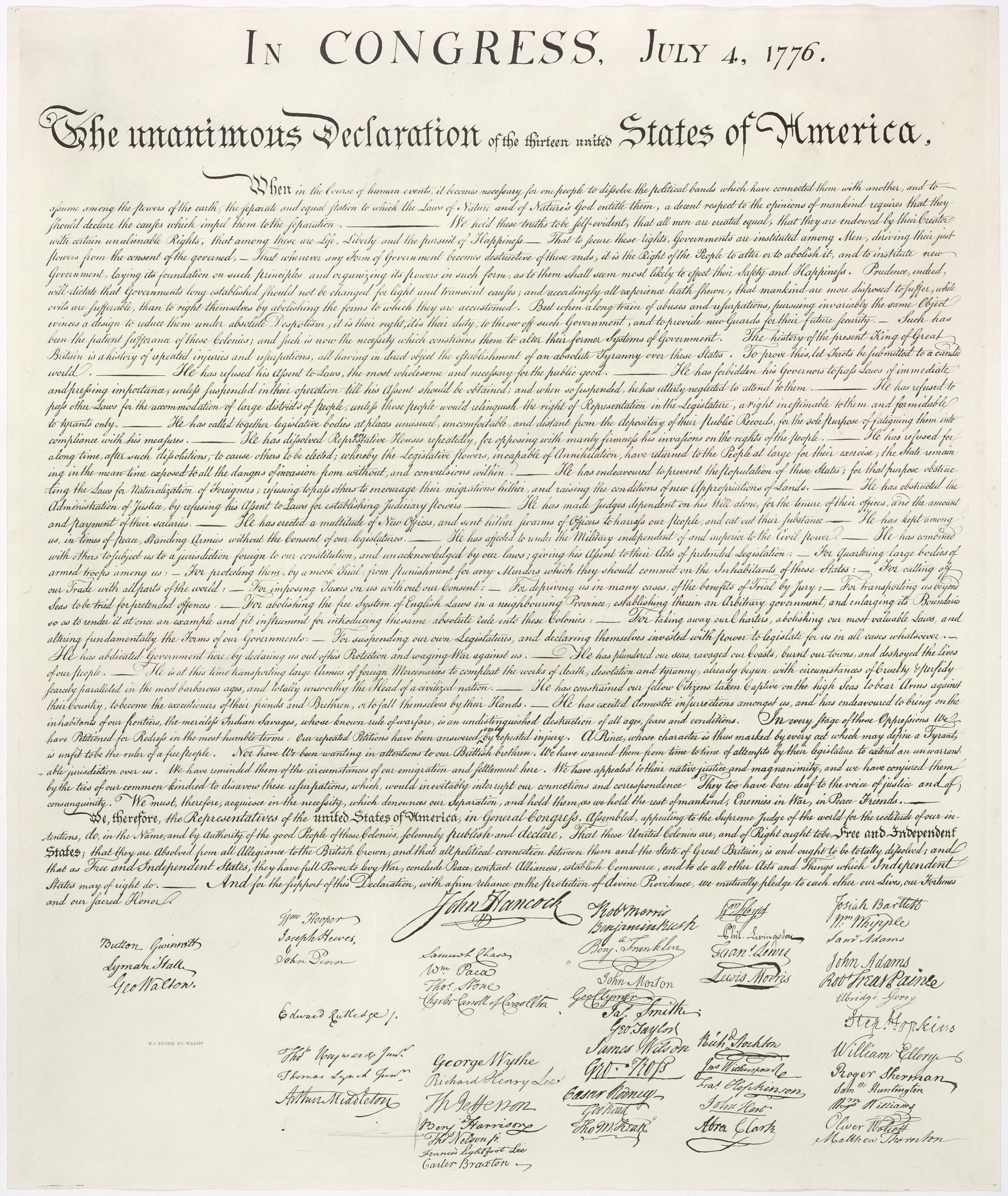
The Declaration of Independence, which Jefferson largely wrote in isolation between June 11 and 28, 1776, from a floor he was renting in a home at 700 Market Street in Center City Philadelphia, contain "the most potent and consequential words in American history," historian Joseph Ellis later wrote.

Jefferson was the primary author of the Declaration of Independence. At age 33, he was one of the youngest delegates to the Second Continental Congress, which convened in the colonial capital of Philadelphia following the Battles of Lexington and Concord, which launched the American Revolutionary War in 1775. Delegates to the Congress overwhelmingly favored authoring, ratifying, and issuing a formal declaration of independence from Britain. Jefferson was inspired by the Enlightenment ideals of the sanctity of the individual, and the writings of Locke and Montesquieu.

Jefferson sought out John Adams, a Continental Congress delegate from Massachusetts and an emerging leader in the Congress. They became close friends, and Adams supported Jefferson's appointment to the Committee of Five, which the Congress charged with authoring the Declaration: Adams, Jefferson, Benjamin Franklin, Robert R. Livingston, and Roger Sherman. The committee initially thought that Adams should write the document, but Adams persuaded the committee to choose Jefferson due to Jefferson being a Virginian, popular, and a good writer by Adams. (Note: Adams recorded his exchange with Jefferson on the question. Jefferson asked, "Why will you not? You ought to do it." To which Adams responded, "I will not—reasons enough." Jefferson replied, "What can be your reasons?" and Adams responded, "Reason first, you are a Virginian, and a Virginian ought to appear at the head of this business. Reason second, I am obnoxious, suspected, and unpopular. You are very much otherwise. Reason third, you can write ten times better than I can." "Well," said Jefferson, "if you are decided, I will do as well as I can." Adams concluded, "Very well. When you have drawn it up, we will have a meeting.")

Jefferson consulted with his fellow committee members, but mostly wrote the Declaration of Independence in isolation between June 11 and 28, 1776. Jefferson drew considerably on his proposed draft of the Virginia Constitution, George Mason's draft of the Virginia Declaration of Rights, and other sources. Other committee members made some changes, and a final draft was presented to Congress on June 28, 1776. Congress began debate over its contents on Monday, July 1, resulting in the removal of roughly a fourth of Jefferson's original draft. Jefferson resented the changes, but he did not speak publicly about them. (Note: Franklin, seated beside the author, observed him "writhing a little under the acrimonious criticisms on some of its parts".) On July 4, 1776, the Congress voted unanimously to ratify the Declaration, and delegates signed it on August 2. Jefferson and the other delegates knew they were committing high treason against the Crown, which was punishable by torture and death.

Following its ratification, the Declaration was released publicly. Two days after its ratification, on July 6, The Pennsylvania Evening Post, was the first newspaper to publish it. On July 8 at noon, it was read publicly and simultaneously for the first time at three designated locations: Trenton, New Jersey; Easton, Pennsylvania; and Philadelphia.

Contemporary historians generally view the Declaration of Independence as one of the most significant and influential written documents in world history, and Jefferson's preamble is regarded as an enduring statement on individual and human rights. Jefferson's phrase "all men are created equal" has been called "one of the best-known sentences in the English language". Harvard University history chairman David Armitage has written that, "No American document has had a greater global impact than the Declaration of Independence", and historian Joseph Ellis has written that the Declaration includes "the most potent and consequential words in American history".

=== Virginia state legislator and governor ===
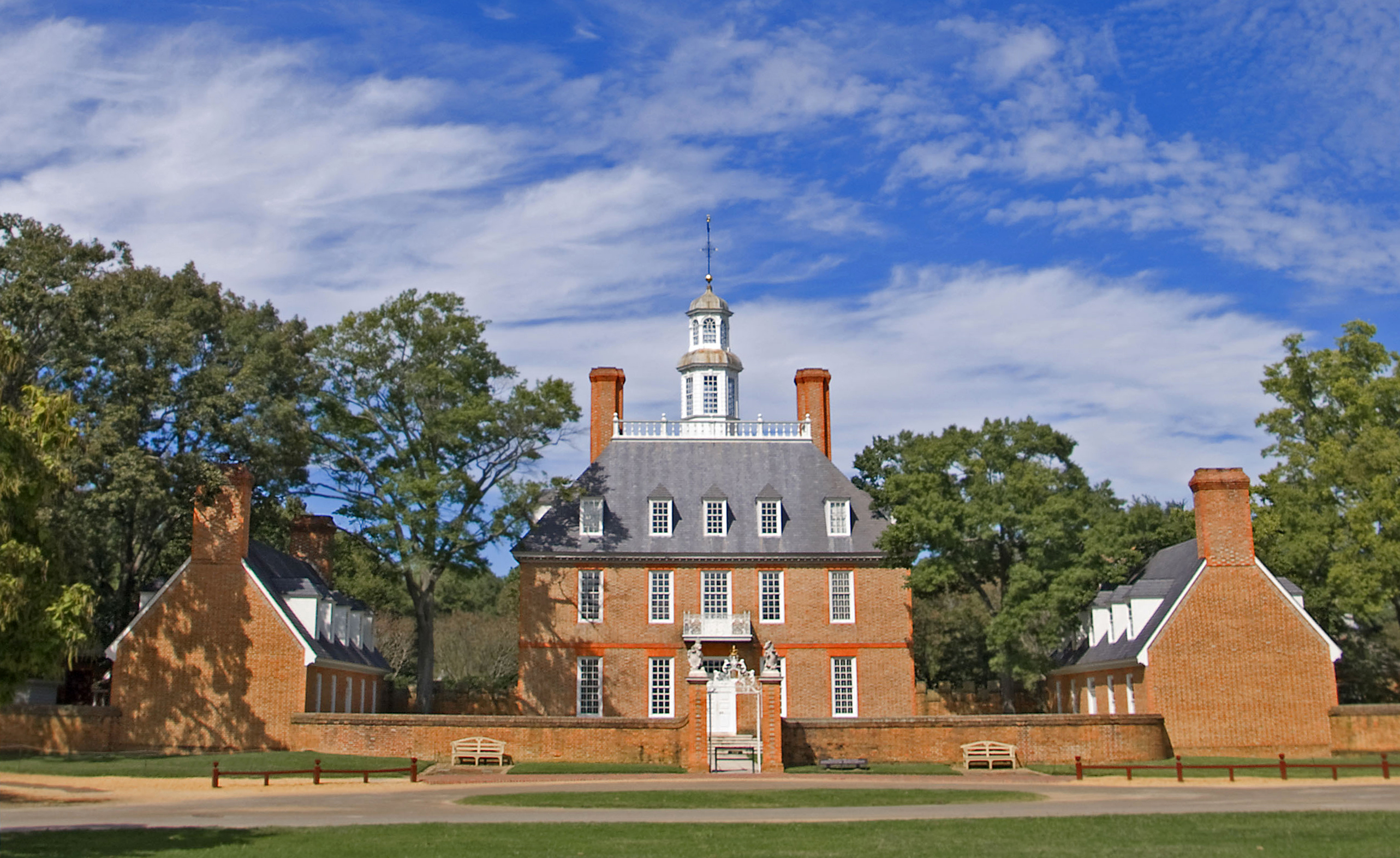
Governor's Palace, Jefferson's residence in Williamsburg during his term as Virginia's governor from 1779 to 1781

At the start of the American Revolution, Colonel Jefferson was named commander of the Albemarle County Militia on September 26, 1775. He was then elected to the Virginia House of Delegates for Albemarle County in September 1776, when finalizing the state constitution was a priority. For nearly three years, Jefferson assisted with the constitution and was especially proud of his Bill for Establishing Religious Freedom, which prohibited state support of religious institutions or enforcement of religious doctrine. The bill failed to pass, as did his legislation to disestablish the Anglican Church, but both were later revived by James Madison.

In 1778, Jefferson was given the task of revising the state's laws. He drafted 126 bills in three years, including laws to streamline the judicial system. He proposed statutes that provided for general education, which he considered the basis of "republican government". Jefferson also was concerned that Virginia's powerful landed gentry were becoming a hereditary aristocracy and took the lead in abolishing what he called "feudal and unnatural distinctions". He targeted laws such as entail and primogeniture by which a deceased landowner's oldest son was vested with all land ownership and power. (Note: The entail laws made it perpetual: the one who inherited the land could not sell it, but had to bequeath it to his oldest son. As a result, increasingly large plantations, worked by white tenant farmers and by black slaves, gained in size, wealth, and political power in the eastern ("Tidewater") tobacco areas. During the Revolutionary era, all such laws were repealed by the states that had them.)

Jefferson was elected governor for one-year terms in 1779 and 1780. He transferred the state capital from Williamsburg to Richmond, and introduced additional measures for public education, religious freedom, and inheritance. Jefferson also supported the General Assembly's refusal to allow slaves to enlist in the American military and in October 1780 signed in a law which promised prospective recruits a signing bonus of "300 acres of land plus a healthy sound Negro between 20 and 30 years of age or 60 pounds in gold or silver."

During General Benedict Arnold's 1781 invasion of Virginia, Jefferson escaped Richmond just ahead of the British forces, which razed the city. He sent emergency dispatches to Colonel Sampson Mathews and other commanders in an attempt to repel Arnold's efforts. When the British occupied Norfolk, Jefferson had caused patriots to burn and destroy it in 1776. General Charles Cornwallis that spring dispatched a cavalry force led by Banastre Tarleton to capture Jefferson and members of the Assembly at Monticello, but Jack Jouett of the Virginia militia thwarted the British plan. (Note: Anthony M. Hance, writing in Tarleton's Fox Hunt, quotes a letter from a Bradley S. Johnson that claims an unnamed girl did the ride. "When Tarleton got to 'Castle Hill,' about twenty miles from Charlottesville, its owner, Colonel Rives, ... detained him with a Virginia break¬ fast — ... while his daughter rode at speed to warn Jefferson and the other rebels." but at the time Castle Hill was not owned by a Colonel Rives but was instead owned by its builder Thomas Walker, though the house did later pass on by inheritance into the Rives family.) Jefferson escaped to Poplar Forest, his plantation to the west. When the General Assembly reconvened in June 1781, it conducted an inquiry into Jefferson's actions which eventually concluded that Jefferson had acted with honor, but Jefferson was not reelected.

In April of the same year, his daughter Lucy died at age one. A second daughter of that name was born the following year, but she died at age two.

In 1782, Jefferson refused a partnership offer by North Carolina Governor Abner Nash, in a profiteering scheme involving the sale of confiscated Loyalist lands. Unlike some Founders, Jefferson was content with his Monticello estate and the land he owned in the vicinity of Virginia's Shenandoah Valley. Jefferson thought of Monticello as an intellectual gathering place for James Madison, James Monroe, and other friends.

Jefferson accused British-based merchants of unfairly depressing tobacco prices and forcing Virginia planters to take on unsustainable debt loads. In 1786, he remarked:

A powerful engine for this [mercantile profiteering] was the giving of good prices and credit to the planter till they got him more immersed in debt than he could pay without selling lands or slaves. They then reduced the prices given for his tobacco so that…they never permitted him to clear off his debt.

=== Notes on the State of Virginia ===
In 1780, Jefferson received a letter of inquiry from French diplomat François Barbé-Marbois into the geography, history, and government of Virginia, as part of a study of the United States. Jefferson organized his responses in a book, Notes on the State of Virginia (1785). The book explores what constitutes a good society, using Virginia as an exemplar. Jefferson included extensive data about the state's natural resources and economy and wrote at length about slavery and miscegenation; he articulated his belief that blacks and whites could not live together as free people in one society because of justified resentments of the enslaved. He also wrote of his views on the American Indians, equating them to European settlers.

Notes was first published in 1785 in French and appeared in English in 1787. Biographer George Tucker considered the work "surprising in the extent of the information which a single individual had been thus far able to acquire, as to the physical features of the state"; University of Virginia historian Merrill D. Peterson described it as an accomplishment for which all Americans should be grateful.

== Member of Congress ==
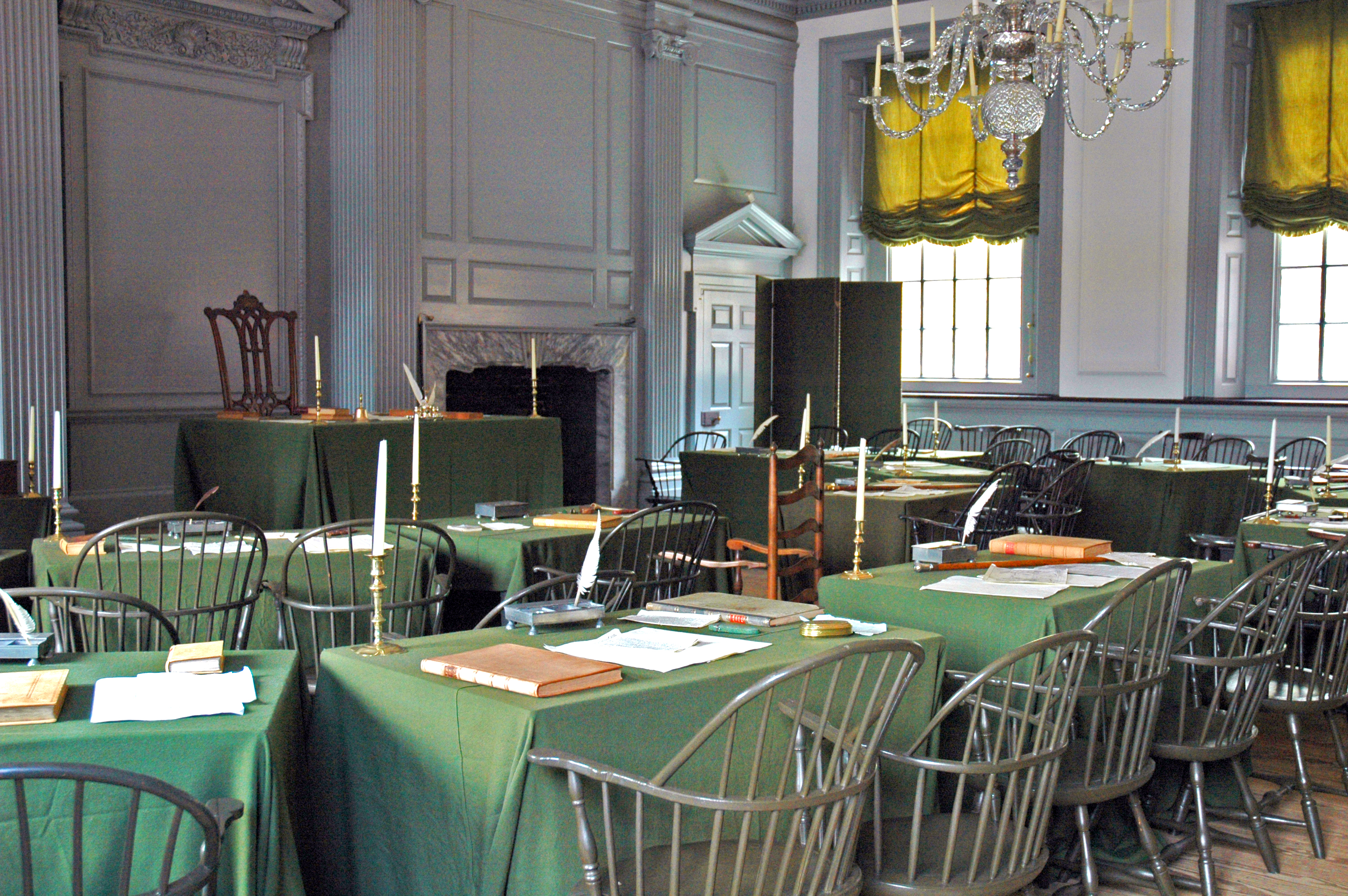
The Assembly Room at Independence Hall in Philadelphia, where Jefferson served as a delegate to the Second Continental Congress and where the Congress edited but unanimously ratified his draft of the Declaration of Independence on July 4, 1776

Jefferson was appointed a Virginia delegate to the Congress of the Confederation organized following the peace treaty with Great Britain in 1783. He was a member of the committee setting foreign exchange rates and recommended an American currency based on the decimal system that was adopted. He advised the formation of the Committee of the States to fill the power vacuum when Congress was in recess. The committee met when Congress adjourned, but disagreements rendered it dysfunctional.

Jefferson sent a letter (revealed in 2025) to Virginia Governor Benjamin Harrison, dated December 31, 1783, in which he relates the wave of enthusiasm of Europeans for taking up arms against their leaders. Jefferson was sharing the affirmation of his own promotion of the right to bear arms that brought about the American Revolution. The letter also conveys Jefferson's anxiety over the final ratification of the Treaty of Paris formally ending the revolutionary war. Signed initially by the parties in September, the still-outstanding consent of two colonies was required in London (then a two-month journey) by the following March. The deadline was ultimately but barely met, with the required signatures made in mid-January.

In the Congress's 1783–1784 session, Jefferson acted as chairman of committees to establish a viable system of government for the new Republic and to propose a policy for settlement of the western territories. He was the principal author of the Land Ordinance of 1784, whereby Virginia ceded to the national government the vast area that it claimed northwest of the Ohio River. He insisted that this territory should not be used as colonial territory by any of the thirteen states, but that it should be divided into sections that could become states. He plotted borders for nine new states in their initial stages and wrote an ordinance banning slavery in all the nation's territories. Congress made extensive revisions and rejected the ban on slavery. The provisions banning slavery, known as the "Jefferson Proviso", were modified and implemented three years later in the Northwest Ordinance of 1787 and became the law for the entire Northwest Territory.

== Minister to France ==
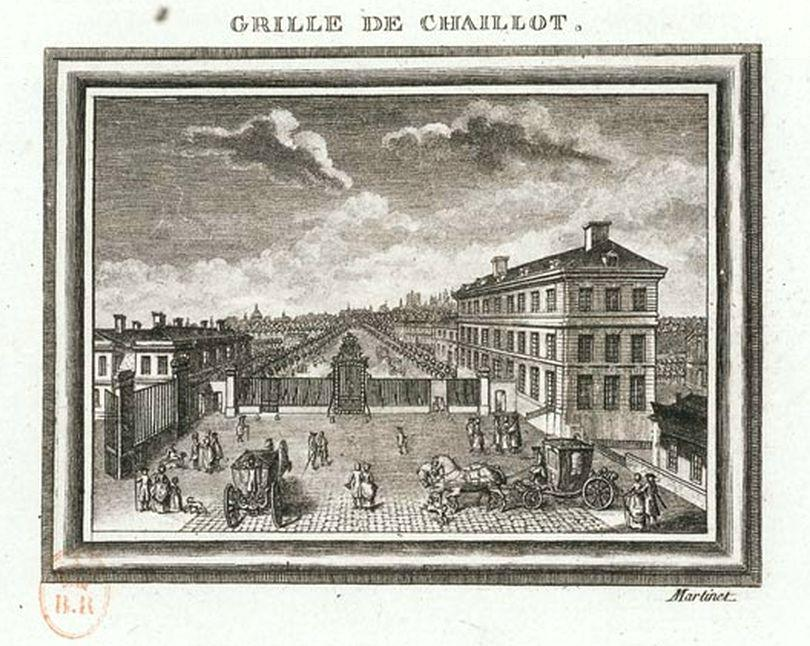
A 1779 engraving of Champs-Élysées seen through the Grille de Chaillot with Jefferson's residence in Paris on the left

On May 7, 1784, Jefferson was appointed by the Congress of the Confederation (Note: the immediate successor to the Second Continental Congress) to join Benjamin Franklin and John Adams in Paris as Minister Plenipotentiary for Negotiating Treaties of Amity and Commerce with Great Britain and other countries. (Note: These included Russia, Austria, Prussia, Denmark, Saxony, Hamburg, Spain, Portugal, Naples, Sardinia, The Papal States, Venice, Genoa, Tuscany, the Sublime Porte, Morocco, Algiers, Tunis, and Tripoli.) With his young daughter Patsy and two servants, he departed in July 1784, arriving in Paris the next month. Jefferson had Patsy educated at Pentemont Abbey. Less than a year later, he was assigned the additional duty of succeeding Franklin as Minister to France. French foreign minister Count de Vergennes commented, "You replace Monsieur Franklin, I hear." Jefferson replied, "I succeed. No man can replace him." During his five years in Paris, Jefferson played a leading role in shaping U.S. foreign policy.

In 1786, he met and fell in love with Maria Cosway, a married 27-year-old musician. She returned to Great Britain after six weeks, but she and Jefferson maintained a lifelong correspondence. During the summer of 1786, Jefferson arrived in London to meet with John Adams, who was then serving as the nation's first US Ambassador to Britain. Adams had official access to George III and arranged a meeting between Jefferson and the king. Jefferson later described the king's reception of the men as "ungracious". According to Adams's grandson, George III turned his back on both in a gesture of public insult. Jefferson returned to France in August.

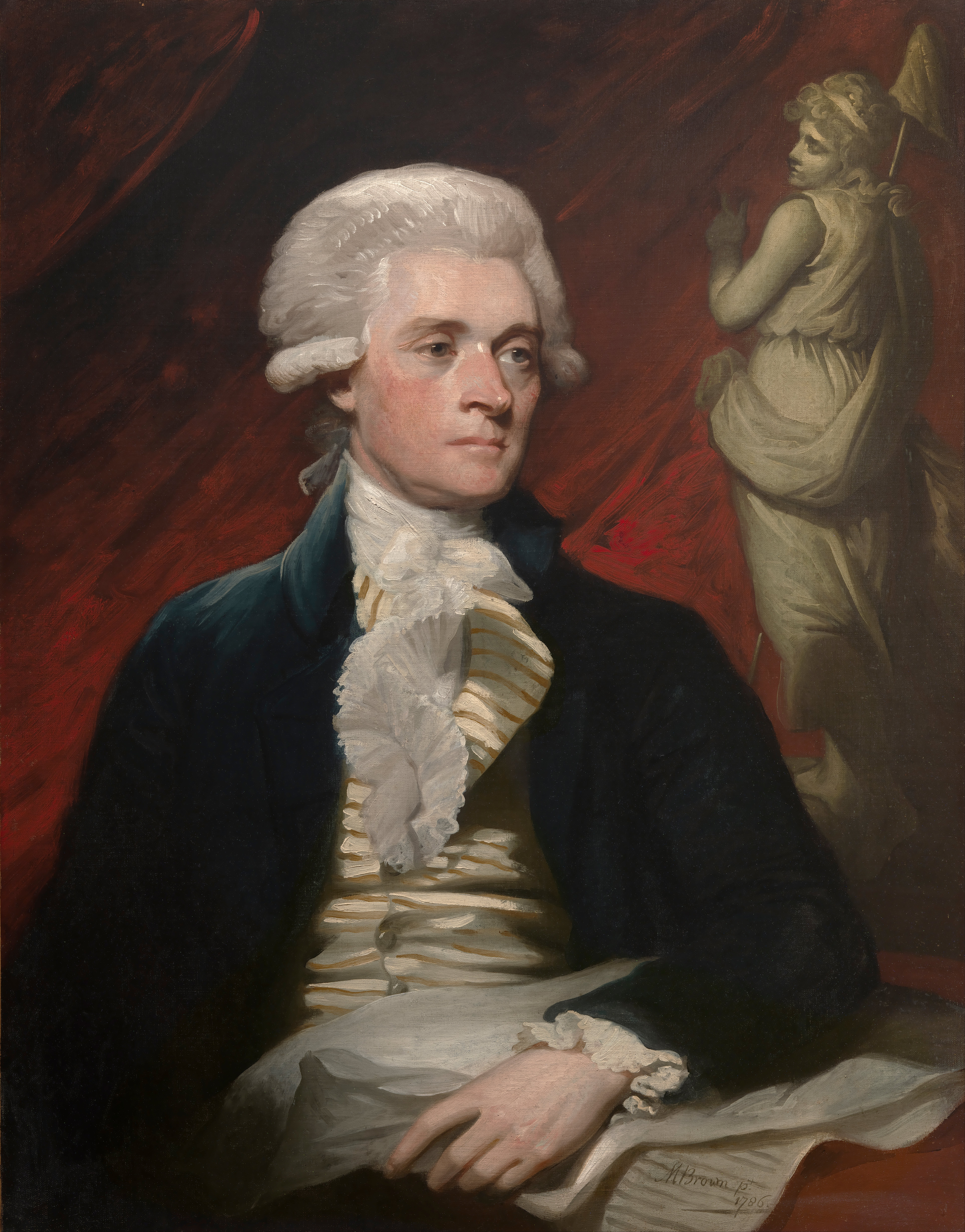
1786 portrait by Mather Brown

Jefferson sent for his youngest surviving child, nine-year-old Polly, in June 1787. She was accompanied by a 14-year-old young slave from Monticello, Sally Hemings. Jefferson had taken her older brother, James Hemings, to Paris as part of his domestic staff and had him trained in French cuisine. According to Sally's son, Madison Hemings, by the time Sally was 16, she was pregnant with 46-year-old Jefferson's child. Madison indicated his mother agreed to return to the United States only after Jefferson promised to free her children when they came of age.

While in France, Jefferson became a regular companion of the Marquis de Lafayette, a French hero of the American Revolution, and Jefferson used his influence with Lafayette to procure trade agreements with France. As the French Revolution began, Jefferson agreed to allow his Paris residence at Hôtel de Langeac to be used for meetings by Lafayette and other revolutionary leaders. He was in Paris during the storming of the Bastille on July 14, 1789, and he consulted with Lafayette as Lafayette drafted the Declaration of the Rights of Man and of the Citizen. Jefferson often found his mail opened by postmasters, so he invented his own enciphering device, the "Wheel Cipher"; he wrote important communications in code for the rest of his career. (Note: An example can be seen at the Library of Congress website.) Unable to attend the 1787 Constitution Convention, Jefferson supported the Constitution but desired the addition of the promised Bill of Rights. Jefferson left Paris for America in September 1789. He remained a firm supporter of the French Revolution while opposing its more violent elements.

== Secretary of State ==
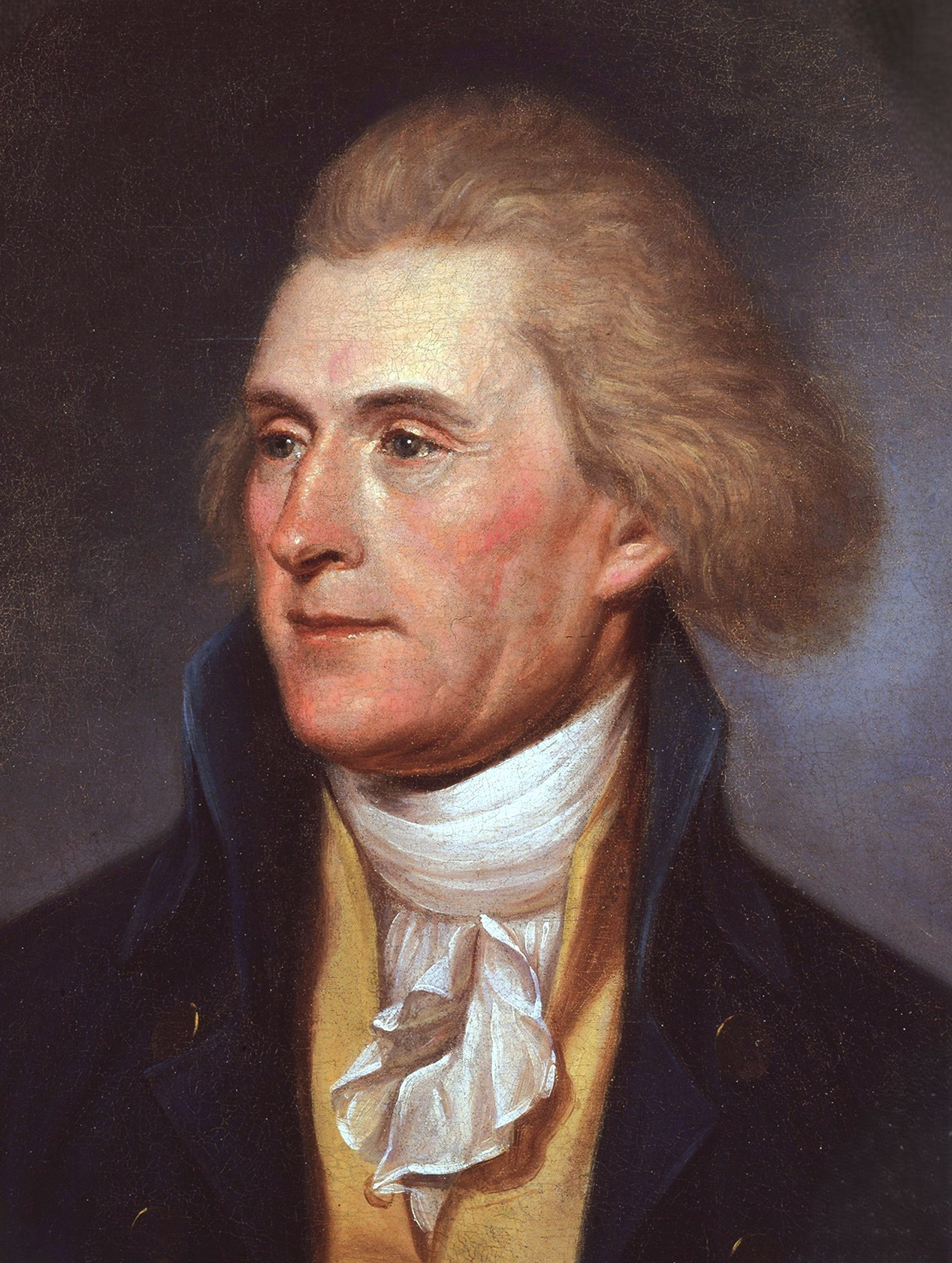
A 48-year-old Jefferson in 1791, in a portrait by Charles Willson Peale

Soon after returning from France, Jefferson accepted President Washington's invitation to serve as Secretary of State. Pressing issues at the time, the national debt and where the new national capital should be placed following its planned relocation from Philadelphia in 1800, placed him at odds with Secretary of the Treasury Alexander Hamilton, who favored a capital close to major commercial centers in the Northeast, while Washington, Jefferson, and other agrarians wanted it further south. After lengthy deadlock, the Compromise of 1790 was struck, permanently locating the capital on the Potomac River, and the federal government assumed the war debts of all original 13 states.

Jefferson opposed a national debt, preferring that each state retire its own, which contrasted with Hamilton's vision of the federal government consolidating state debts and establishing national credit and a national bank. Jefferson strenuously opposed both policies and attempted to undermine Hamilton's agenda, which nearly led Washington to dismiss him from the cabinet. He later left the cabinet voluntarily.

Jefferson's goals were to decrease American dependence on British commerce and to expand commercial trade with France. He sought to weaken Spanish colonialism of the Trans-Appalachia and British control in the North, believing this would aid in the pacification of Native Americans.

Along with political protegé James Madison, then a U.S. Representative, and author Philip Freneau, Jefferson co-founded the National Gazette in Philadelphia in 1791, which sought to counter the policies of the Federalist Party, which Hamilton was promoting through the Gazette of the United States, an influential Federalist newspaper. The National Gazette criticized the policies promoted by Hamilton, often in anonymous essays signed by the pen name Brutus at Jefferson's urging and written by Madison. In the spring of 1791, Jefferson was suffering from migraines and tiring of the infighting with Hamilton, so he and Madison departed for a vacation in Vermont.

In May 1792, Jefferson's concern about emerging political rivalries in the young nation was escalating, and he wrote Washington, imploring him to run for reelection for a second term that year as a unifying influence. He urged the president to rally the citizenry to a party that would defend democracy against the corrupting influence of banks and financial-focused interests, which the Federalists were embracing and espousing. Historians recognize Jefferson's letter to Washington as one of the first delineations of Democratic-Republican Party principles. Jefferson, Madison, and other Democratic-Republican organizers favored states' rights and local control and opposed the federal concentration of power. Hamilton, conversely, sought more power vested in the federal government.

Jefferson supported France against Britain when the two nations fought in 1793, though his arguments in Washington's Cabinet were undercut by French Revolutionary envoy Edmond-Charles Genêt's open scorn for Washington. In discussions with British Minister George Hammond, Jefferson tried in vain to persuade the British to vacate their posts in the Northwest and to compensate the U.S. for enslaved people freed by the British at the end of the Revolutionary War. Jefferson also sought to return to private life, and resigned from the cabinet in December 1793; he may also have wanted to bolster his political influence from outside the administration.

After the Washington administration negotiated the Jay Treaty with Britain in 1794, Jefferson saw a cause around which he could rally the Democratic-Republican Party. He organized national opposition to the treaty from Monticello. The treaty, designed by Hamilton, aimed to reduce tensions and increase trade. Jefferson warned that it would increase British influence and subvert republicanism, calling it "the boldest act [Hamilton and Jay] ever ventured on to undermine the government". The Treaty passed, but it expired in 1805 during Jefferson's presidential administration, and then President Jefferson did not renew it. Jefferson continued his pro-France stance; during the violence of the Reign of Terror, he declined to disavow the revolution. "To back away from France would be to undermine the cause of republicanism in America", he wrote.

== Election of 1796 and vice presidency ==
The results of the 1796 U.S. presidential election between Adams and Jefferson, won by Adams

In the presidential campaign of 1796, Jefferson lost the electoral college vote to Federalist John Adams 71–68. He did, however, receive the second-highest number of votes and, under the electoral laws at the time, was elected as vice president. As presiding officer of the United States Senate, Jefferson assumed a more passive role than his predecessor, John Adams. He allowed the Senate to freely conduct debates and confined his participation to procedural issues, which he called an "honorable and easy" role. Jefferson previously studied parliamentary law and procedure for 40 years, making him qualified to serve as presiding officer. In 1800, he published his assembled notes on Senate procedure as A Manual of Parliamentary Practice. He cast only three tie-breaking votes in the Senate.

In four confidential talks with French consul Joseph Létombe in the spring of 1797, Jefferson attacked Adams, predicting that his rival would only serve one term. He also encouraged France to invade England, and advised Létombe to stall any American envoys sent to Paris. This toughened the tone that the French government adopted toward the Adams administration. After Adams's initial peace envoys were rebuffed, Jefferson and his supporters lobbied for the release of papers related to the incident, called the XYZ Affair after the letters used to disguise the identities of the French officials involved. But the tactic backfired when it was revealed that French officials had demanded bribes, rallying public support against France. The U.S. began an undeclared naval war with France known as the Quasi-War.

During the Adams presidency, the Federalists rebuilt the military, levied new taxes, and enacted the Alien and Sedition Acts. Jefferson believed these laws were intended to suppress Democratic-Republicans, rather than prosecute enemy aliens, and considered them unconstitutional. To rally opposition, he and James Madison anonymously wrote the Kentucky and Virginia Resolutions, asserting that the federal government had no right to exercise powers not specifically delegated to it by the states. The resolutions followed the "interposition" approach of Madison, that states may shield their citizens from federal laws that they deem unconstitutional. Jefferson advocated nullification, allowing states to entirely invalidate federal laws. (Note: Jefferson's Kentucky draft said: "where powers are assumed which have not been delegated, a nullification of the act is the rightful remedy: that every State has a natural right in cases not within the compact, (casus non fœderis) to nullify of their own authority all assumptions of power by others within their limits.") He warned that, "unless arrested at the threshold", the Alien and Sedition Acts would "drive these states into revolution and blood".

Biographer Ron Chernow contends that "the theoretical damage of the Kentucky and Virginia Resolutions was deep and lasting, and was a recipe for disunion", and contributed to the outbreak of the American Civil War and later events. Washington was so appalled by the resolutions that he told Patrick Henry that, if "systematically and pertinaciously pursued", the resolutions would "dissolve the union or produce coercion". Jefferson had always admired Washington's leadership skills but felt that his Federalist party was leading the country in the wrong direction. He decided not to attend Washington's funeral in 1799 because of acute differences with him while serving as secretary of state.

=== Election of 1800 ===
The results of the 1800 presidential election between Adams and Jefferson, which Jefferson won, making him the nation's third president

Jefferson ran for president against John Adams again in 1800. Adams' campaign was weakened by unpopular taxes and vicious Federalist infighting over his actions in the Quasi-War. Democratic-Republicans pointed to the Alien and Sedition Acts and accused the Federalists of being secret pro-Britain monarchists. Federalists, in turn, charged that Jefferson was a godless libertine beholden to the French. UCLA history professor Joyce Appleby described the 1800 presidential election as "one of the most acrimonious in the annals of American history".

The Democratic-Republicans ultimately won more electoral college votes, due in part to the electors that resulted from the addition of three-fifths of the South's slaves to the population calculation under the Three-Fifths Compromise. Jefferson and his vice presidential candidate Aaron Burr unexpectedly received an equal total. Because of the tie, the election was decided by the Federalist-dominated U.S. House of Representatives. (Note: This electoral process problem was addressed by the Twelfth Amendment to the United States Constitution in 1804, which provided separate votes for presidential and vice-presidential candidates.) Hamilton lobbied Federalist representatives on Jefferson's behalf, believing him a lesser political evil than Burr. On February 17, 1801, after thirty-six ballots, the House elected Jefferson president and Burr vice president.

The win led to Democratic-Republican celebrations throughout the country. Some of Jefferson's opponents argued that he owed his victory to the South's inflated number of electors. Others alleged that Jefferson secured James Asheton Bayard's tie-breaking electoral vote by promising to retain various Federalist posts in the government. Jefferson disputed the allegation, and the historical record is inconclusive.

The transition proceeded smoothly, marking a watershed in American history. Historian Gordon S. Wood writes that, "it was one of the first popular elections in modern history that resulted in the peaceful transfer of power from one 'party' to another."

== Presidency (1801–1809) ==
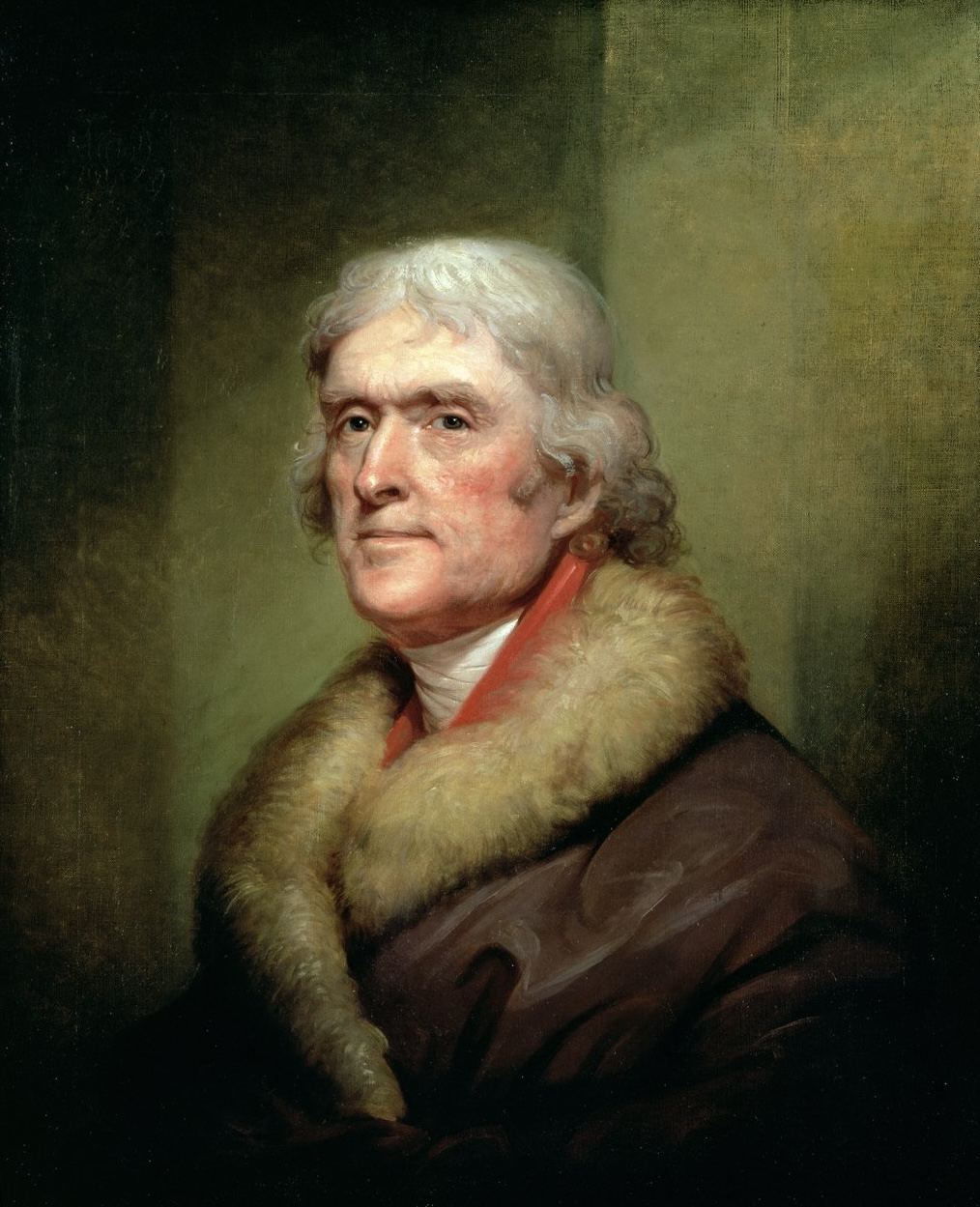
Portrait by Rembrandt Peale, c. 1805

Jefferson was sworn in as president by Chief Justice John Marshall at the new Capitol in Washington, D.C., on March 4, 1801. His inauguration was not attended by outgoing President Adams. In contrast to his two predecessors, Jefferson exhibited a dislike of formal etiquette. Plainly dressed, he chose to walk alongside friends to the Capitol from his nearby boardinghouse instead of arriving by carriage. His inaugural address struck a note of reconciliation and commitment to democratic ideology, declaring, "We have been called by different names brethren of the same principle. We are all Republicans, we are all Federalists." Ideologically, he stressed "equal and exact justice to all men", minority rights, and freedom of speech, religion, and press. He said that a free and republican government was "the strongest government on earth". He nominated moderate Republicans to his cabinet: James Madison as secretary of state, Henry Dearborn as secretary of war, Levi Lincoln as attorney general, and Robert Smith as secretary of the navy.

Widowed since 1782, Jefferson first relied on his two daughters to serve as his official hostesses. In late May 1801, he asked Dolley Madison, wife of his long-time friend James Madison, to be the permanent White House hostess. She was also in charge of the completion of the White House mansion. Dolley served as White House hostess for the rest of Jefferson's two terms and then for another eight years as First Lady while her husband was president.

=== Financial affairs ===
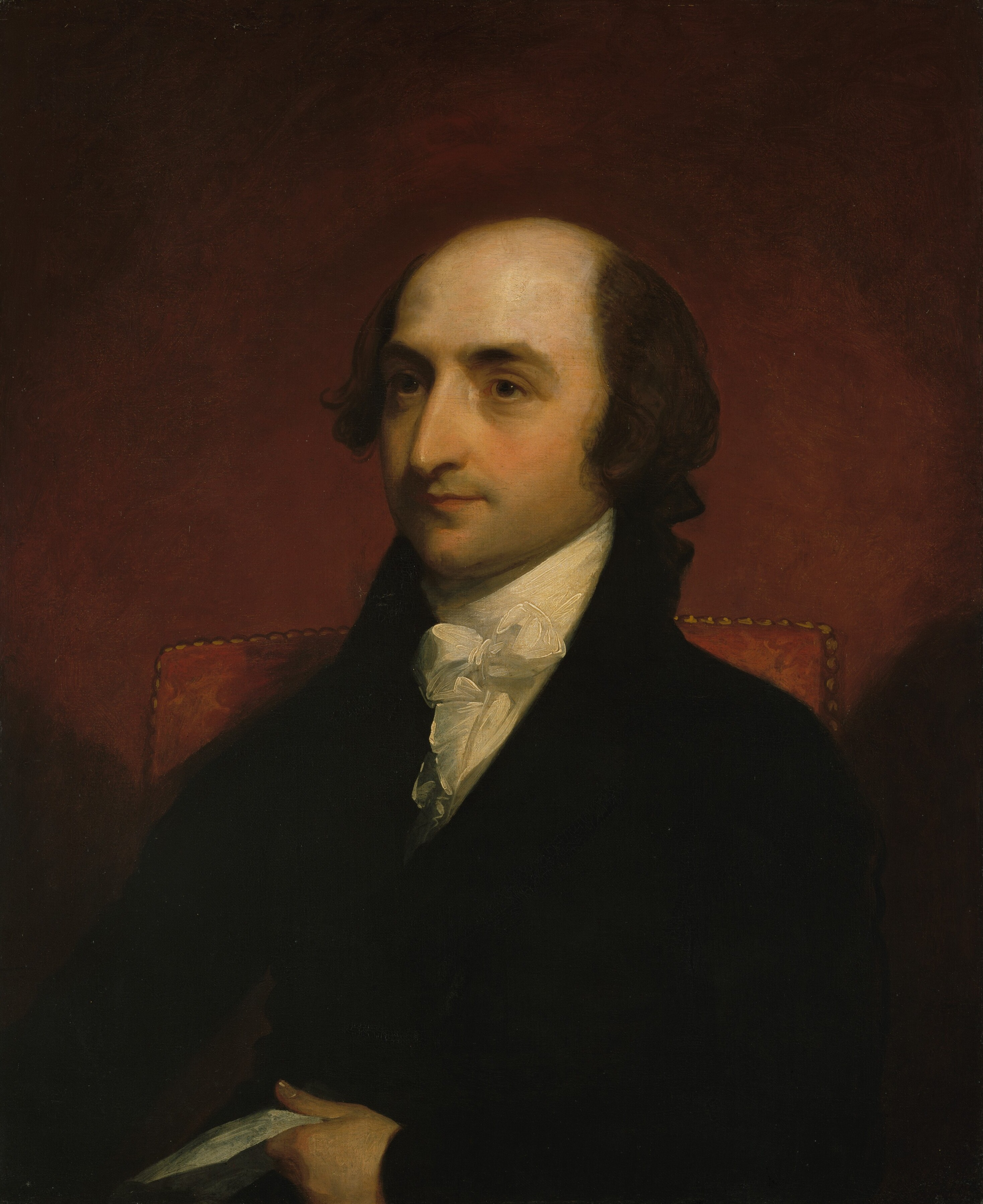
Albert Gallatin, Jefferson's Treasury Secretary, portrait by Gilbert Stuart, c. 1803

Jefferson's first challenge as president was shrinking the $83 million national debt. He began dismantling Hamilton's Federalist fiscal system with help from the secretary of the treasury, Albert Gallatin. Gallatin devised a plan to eliminate the national debt in sixteen years by extensive annual appropriations and reduction in taxes. The administration eliminated the whiskey excise and other taxes after closing "unnecessary offices" and cutting "useless establishments and expenses".

Jefferson believed that the First Bank of the United States represented a "most deadly hostility" to republican government. He wanted to dismantle the bank before its charter expired in 1811, but was dissuaded by Gallatin. Gallatin argued that the national bank was a useful financial institution and set out to expand its operations. Jefferson looked to other corners to address the growing national debt. He shrank the Navy, for example, deeming it unnecessary in peacetime, and incorporated a fleet of inexpensive gunboats intended only for local defense to avoid provocation against foreign powers. After two terms, he had lowered the national debt from $83 million to $57 million.

=== Domestic affairs ===
Jefferson pardoned several of those imprisoned under the Alien and Sedition Acts. Congressional Republicans repealed the Judiciary Act of 1801, which removed nearly all of Adams's "midnight judges". A subsequent appointment battle led to the Supreme Court's landmark decision in Marbury v. Madison, asserting judicial review over executive branch actions. Jefferson appointed three Supreme Court justices: William Johnson (1804), Henry Brockholst Livingston (1807), and Thomas Todd (1807).

Jefferson strongly felt the need for a national military university, producing an officer engineering corps for a national defense based on the advancement of the sciences, rather than having to rely on foreign sources. He signed the Military Peace Establishment Act on March 16, 1802, founding the United States Military Academy at West Point. The act documented a new set of laws and limits for the military. Jefferson was also hoping to bring reform to the Executive branch, replacing Federalists and active opponents throughout the officer corps to promote Republican values.

Jefferson took great interest in the Library of Congress, which had been established in 1800. He often recommended books to acquire. In 1802, Congress authorized Jefferson to name the first Librarian of Congress, and formed a committee to establish library regulations. Congress also granted both the president and vice president the right to use the library.

=== Foreign affairs (1801–1805) ===
==== First Barbary War ====
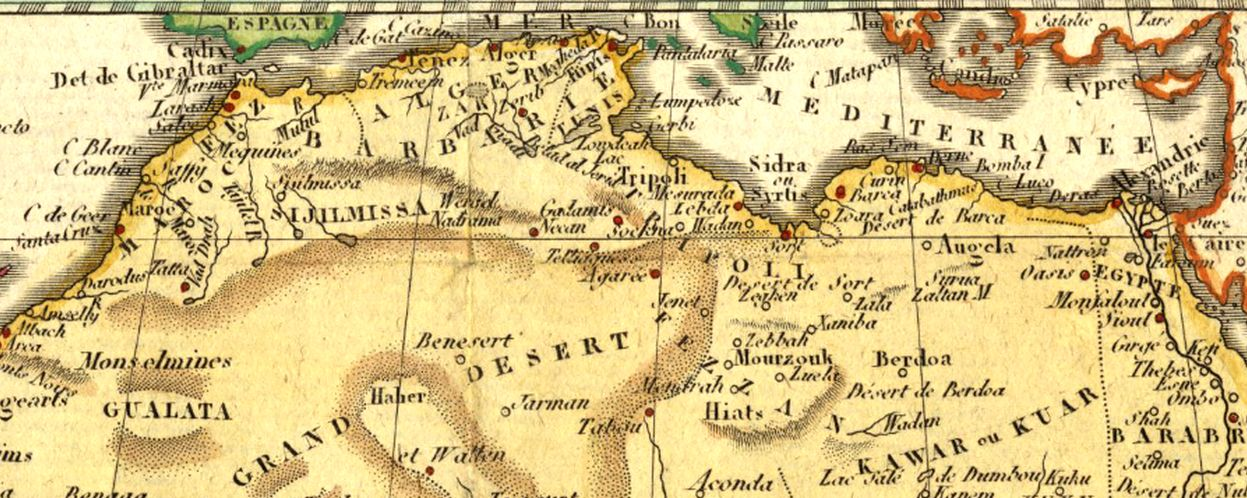
The Barbary Coast of North Africa in 1806, including (left to right): Morocco, Gibraltar, Tunis, and Tripoli

American merchant ships had been protected from Barbary Coast pirates by the Royal Navy when the states were British colonies. After independence, however, pirates often captured U.S. merchant ships, pillaged cargoes, and enslaved or held crew members for ransom. Jefferson had opposed paying tribute to the Barbary States since 1785. In 1801, he authorized a U.S. Navy fleet under Commodore Richard Dale to make a show of force in the Mediterranean, the first American naval squadron to cross the Atlantic. Following the fleet's first engagement, he successfully asked Congress for a declaration of war. The "First Barbary War" was the first foreign war fought by the U.S.

Pasha of Tripoli Yusuf Karamanli captured the USS Philadelphia, so Jefferson authorized William Eaton, the U.S. Consul to Tunis, to lead a force to restore the pasha's older brother to the throne. The American navy forced Tunis and Algiers into breaking their alliance with Tripoli. Jefferson ordered five separate naval bombardments of Tripoli, leading the pasha to sign a treaty that restored peace in the Mediterranean. This victory proved only temporary, but according to Wood, "many Americans celebrated it as a vindication of their policy of spreading free trade around the world and as a great victory for liberty over tyranny."

==== Louisiana Purchase ====
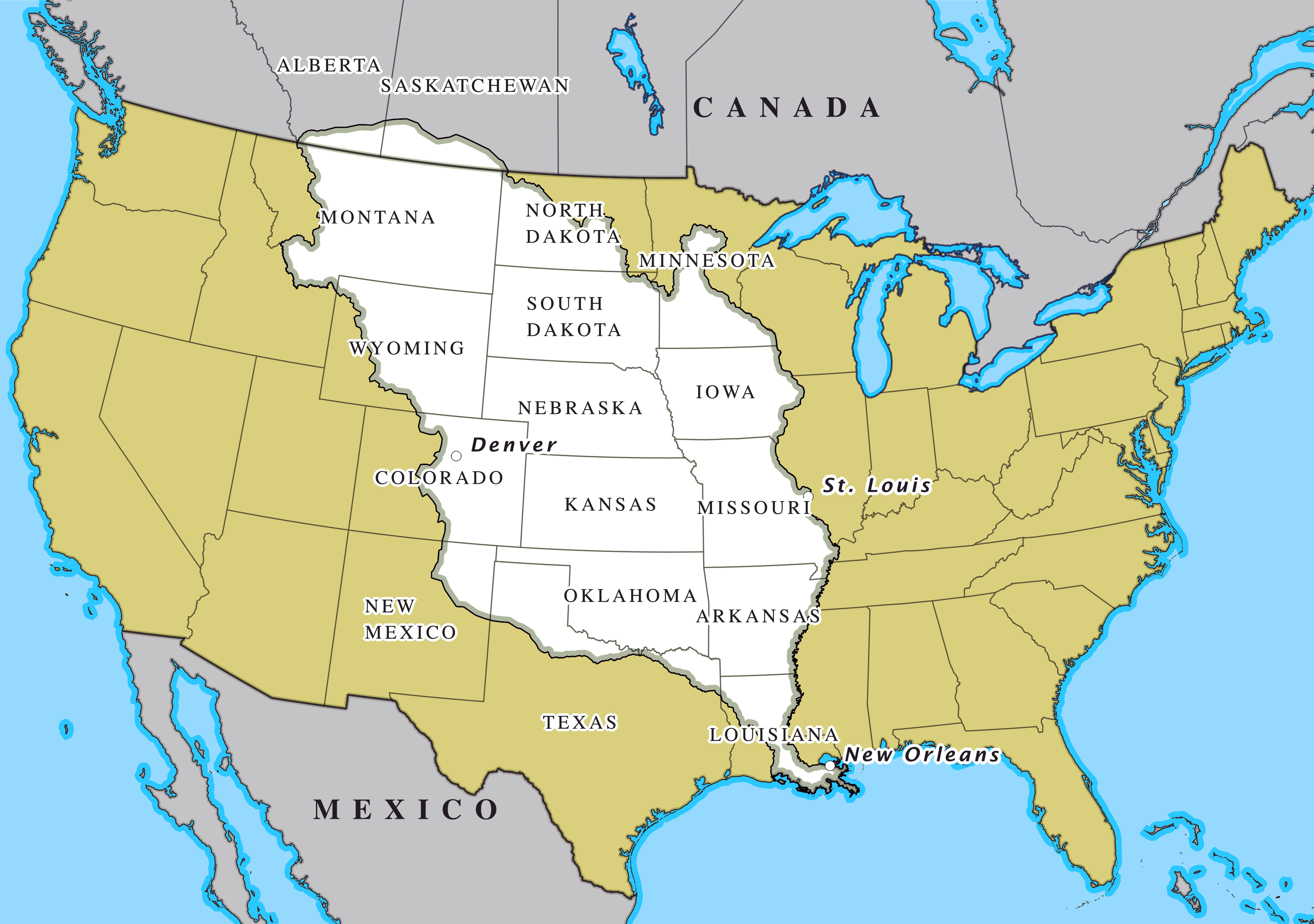
The 1803 Louisiana Purchase, completed during Jefferson's presidency, added 827,987 square miles (2,144,480 square kilometres), which doubled the geographic size of the United States.

Spain ceded ownership of the Louisiana territory in 1800 to France. Jefferson was concerned that Napoleon's interests in the vast territory would threaten the security of the continent and Mississippi River shipping. He wrote that the cession "works most sorely on the U.S. It completely reverses all the political relations of the U.S." In 1802, he instructed James Monroe and Robert R. Livingston to negotiate the purchase of New Orleans and adjacent coastal areas. In early 1803, Jefferson offered Napoleon nearly $10 million for 40,000 square miles (100,000 square kilometres) of tropical territory.

Napoleon realized that French military control was impractical over such a vast remote territory, and he was in dire need of funds for his wars on the home front. In early April 1803, he unexpectedly made negotiators a counter-offer to sell 827,987 square miles (2,144,480 square kilometres) of French territory for $15 million (~$391 million in 2025), doubling the size of the United States. U.S. negotiators accepted the offer and signed the treaty on April 30, 1803. Word of the unexpected purchase did not reach Jefferson until July 3, 1803. He unknowingly acquired the most fertile tract of land of its size on Earth, making the new country self-sufficient in food and other resources. The sale also significantly curtailed European presence in North America, removing obstacles to U.S. westward expansion.

Most thought that this was an exceptional opportunity, despite Republican reservations about the Constitutional authority of the federal government to acquire land. Jefferson initially thought that a Constitutional amendment was necessary to purchase and govern the new territory; but he later changed his mind, fearing that this would give cause to oppose the purchase, and urged a speedy debate and ratification. On October 20, 1803, the Senate ratified the purchase treaty by a vote of 24–7. Jefferson personally was humble about acquiring the Louisiana Territory, but he resented complainers who called the vast domain a "howling wilderness".

After the purchase, Jefferson preserved the region's Spanish legal code and instituted a gradual approach to integrating settlers into American democracy. He believed that a period of the federal rule would be necessary while Louisianans adjusted to their new nation. (Note: Louisiana nevertheless gained statehood nine years later in 1812.) Historians have differed in their assessments regarding the constitutional implications of the sale, but they typically hail the Louisiana acquisition as a major accomplishment. Frederick Jackson Turner called the purchase the most formative event in American history.

=== Expeditions ===
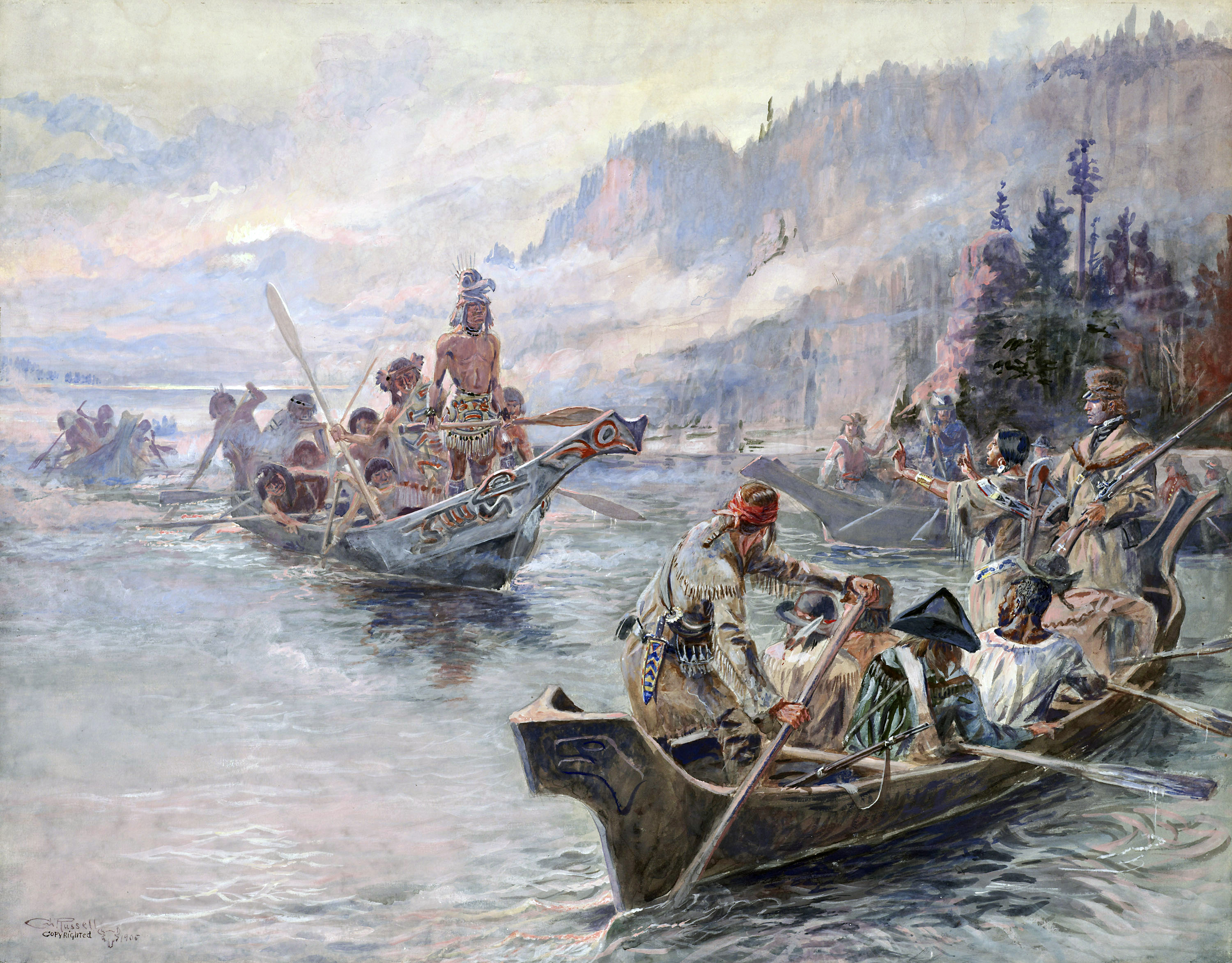
Lewis and Clark on the Lower Columbia, a 1905 portrait by Charles Marion Russell depicting Lewis and Clark's expedition on the Columbia River during Jefferson's presidency

Jefferson anticipated further westward settlements due to the Louisiana Purchase and arranged for the exploration and mapping of the uncharted territory. He sought to establish a U.S. claim ahead of competing European interests and to find the rumored Northwest Passage. Jefferson and others were influenced by exploration accounts of Le Page du Pratz in Louisiana (1763) and James Cook in the Pacific (1784), and they persuaded Congress in 1804 to fund an expedition to explore and map the newly acquired territory to the Pacific Ocean.

Jefferson appointed secretary Meriwether Lewis and acquaintance William Clark to lead the Corps of Discovery (1803–1806). In the months leading up to the expedition, Jefferson tutored Lewis in the sciences of mapping, botany, natural history, mineralogy, and astronomy and navigation, giving him unlimited access to his library at Monticello, which included the largest collection of books in the world on the subject of the geography and natural history of the North American continent, along with an impressive collection of maps. The expedition lasted from May 1804 to September 1806 and obtained a wealth of scientific and geographic knowledge, including knowledge of many Indian tribes.

Jefferson organized three other western expeditions: the William Dunbar and George Hunter Expedition on the Ouachita River (1804–1805), the Thomas Freeman and Peter Custis Expedition (1806) on the Red River, and the Zebulon Pike Expedition (1806–1807) into the Rocky Mountains and the Southwest. All three produced valuable information about the American frontier. This interest also motivated Jefferson to meet the Prussian explorer Alexander von Humboldt several times in June 1804, inquiring into Humboldt's knowledge of New Spain's natural resources, economic prospects, and demographic development.

=== Native American affairs ===
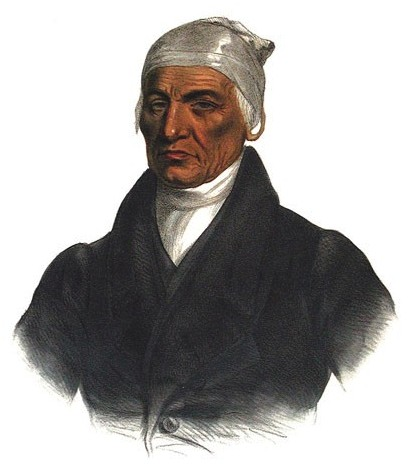
Black Hoof, leader of the Shawnee, accepted Jefferson's Indian assimilation policies.

Jefferson refuted the contemporary notion that Indians were inferior and maintained that they were equal in body and mind to people of European descent, although he believed them to be inferior in terms of culture and technology. As governor of Virginia during the Revolutionary War, Jefferson recommended moving the Cherokee and Shawnee tribes, who had allied with the British, to west of the Mississippi River. But when he took office as president, he quickly took measures to avert another major conflict, as American and Indian societies were in collision and the British were inciting Indian tribes from Canada. In Georgia, he stipulated that the state would release its legal claims for lands to its west in exchange for military support in expelling the Cherokee from Georgia. This facilitated his policy of western expansion, to "advance compactly as we multiply".

In keeping with his Enlightenment thinking, President Jefferson adopted an assimilation policy toward American Indians known as his "civilization program" which included securing peaceful U.S.–Indian treaty alliances and encouraging agriculture. Jefferson advocated that Indian tribes should make federal purchases by credit holding their lands as collateral. Various tribes accepted Jefferson's policies, including the Shawnees led by Black Hoof, the Muscogee, and the Cherokee. However, some Shawnees, led by Tecumseh, broke off from Black Hoof, and opposed Jefferson's assimilation policies.

Historian Bernard Sheehan argues that Jefferson believed that assimilation was best for American Indians, and next-best was removal to the west; he felt that the worst outcome of the conflict would be their attacking the whites. Jefferson told U.S. Secretary of War Henry Dearborn, who then oversaw Indian affairs, "If we are constrained to lift the hatchet against any tribe, we will never lay it down until that tribe is exterminated or driven beyond the Mississippi." Miller agrees that Jefferson believed that Indians should assimilate to American customs and agriculture. Historians such as Peter S. Onuf and Merrill D. Peterson argue that Jefferson's actual Indian policies did little to promote assimilation and were a pretext to seize lands.

=== Re-election in 1804 and second term ===
Results from the 1804 U.S. presidential election in which Jefferson was reelected overwhelmingly to a second term as president

Jefferson was nominated for reelection by the Democratic-Republican Party, with George Clinton replacing Burr as his running mate. The Federalist Party ran Charles Cotesworth Pinckney of South Carolina, John Adams's vice presidential candidate in the 1800 election. The Jefferson-Clinton ticket won overwhelmingly in the electoral college vote, by 162 to 14, promoting their achievement of a strong economy, lower taxes, and the Louisiana Purchase.

In March 1806, a split developed in the Democratic-Republican Party, led by fellow Virginian and former Republican ally John Randolph, who viciously accused President Jefferson on the floor of the House of moving too far in the Federalist direction, permanently setting Randolph apart politically from Jefferson. Jefferson and Madison backed resolutions to limit or ban British imports in retaliation for British seizures of American shipping. Also, in 1808, Jefferson was the first president to propose a broad federal plan to build roads and canals across several states, asking for $20 million, further alarming Randolph and believers of limited government.

Jefferson's popularity suffered further in his second term as a result of his response to wars in Europe. Relations with Britain deteriorated, due partly to the antipathy between Jefferson and British diplomat Anthony Merry. After Napoleon's decisive victory at the Battle of Austerlitz in 1805, Napoleon became more aggressive in his negotiations with Jefferson and the U.S. over trading rights, which the U.S. proved unsuccessful in countering. Jefferson then led the enactment of the Embargo Act of 1807, directed at both France and Britain, which triggered economic chaos in the U.S. and was strongly criticized, leading Jefferson to abandon the policy a year later.

During the American Revolution, colonial states abolished the international slave trade, but South Carolina reopened it. In his annual message of December 1806, Jefferson denounced the international slave trade as "violations of human rights" and called on the new Congress to immediately criminalize it. The following year, in 1807, Congress passed the Act Prohibiting Importation of Slaves, which Jefferson signed. The act established severe punishment against the international slave trade, although it did not address the issue domestically.

In Haiti, Jefferson's neutrality allowed arms to flow to the slave independence movement during the Haitian Revolution, and Jefferson blocked attempts to assist Napoleon, who was defeated militarily in Haiti in 1803. But Jefferson's administration refused official recognition of Haiti during his second term, in deference to southern complaints about racial violence against slave holders. Recognition was not extended to Haiti until 1862.

=== Controversies ===
==== Burr conspiracy and trial ====
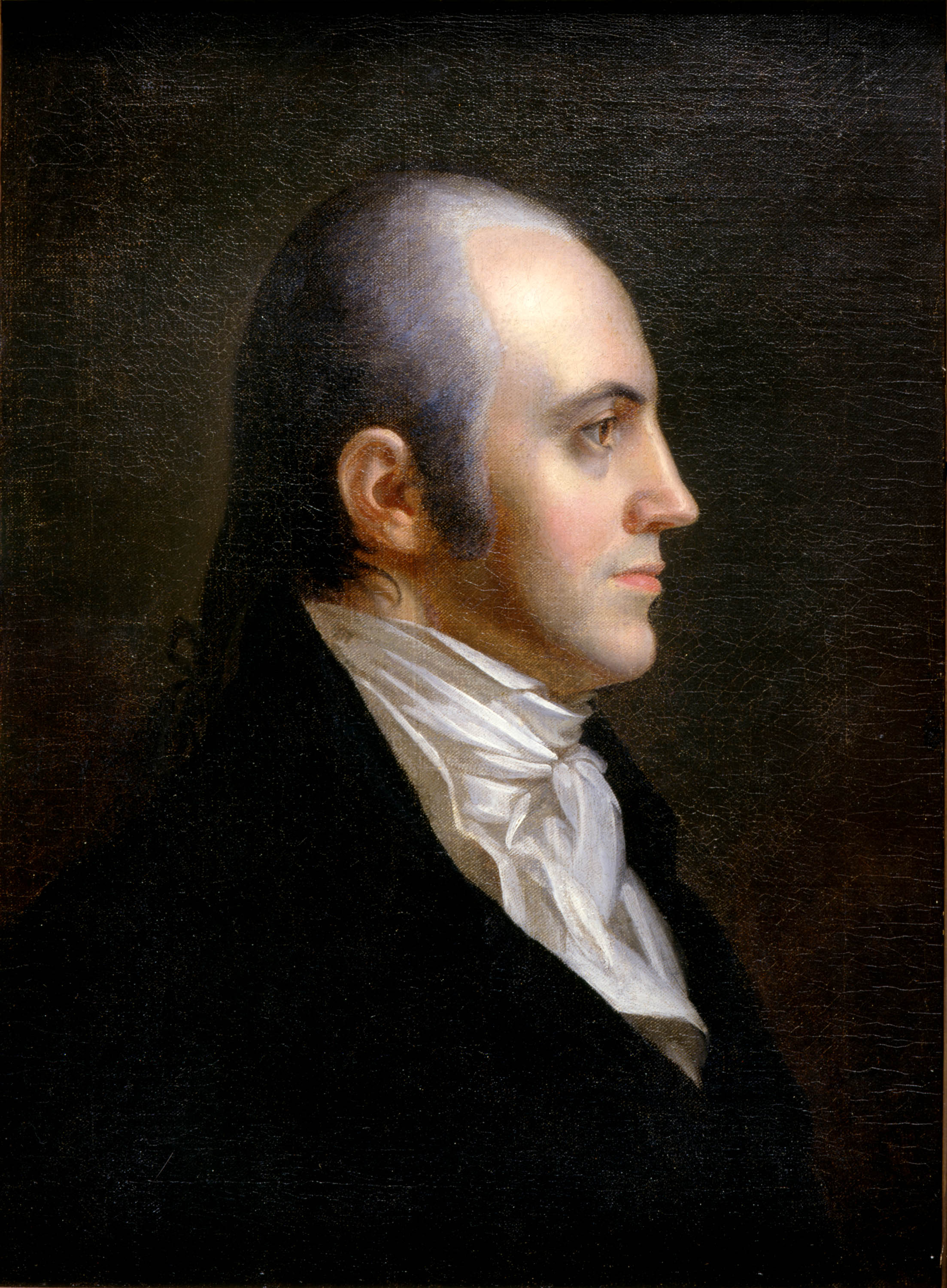
An 1802 portrait of Aaron Burr by John Vanderlyn

Following the 1801 electoral deadlock, Jefferson's relationship with his vice president, Aaron Burr, rapidly eroded. Jefferson suspected Burr of seeking the presidency for himself, while Burr was angered by Jefferson's refusal to appoint some of his supporters to federal office. Burr was dropped from the Democratic-Republican ticket in 1804 in favor of charismatic George Clinton.

The same year, Burr was soundly defeated in his bid to be elected New York governor. During the campaign, Alexander Hamilton made publicly callous remarks regarding Burr's moral character. Burr challenged Hamilton to a duel, held on July 11, 1804. In the duel, Burr mortally wounded Hamilton, who died the following day. Burr was subsequently indicted for Hamilton's murder, causing him to flee to Georgia, even though he remained president of the U.S. Senate during Supreme Court Justice Samuel Chase's impeachment trial. Both indictments quietly died and Burr was not prosecuted.

In August 1804, Burr contacted British Minister Anthony Merry offering to cede U.S. western territory in return for money and British ships. After leaving office in April 1805, Burr traveled west and conspired with Louisiana Territory governor James Wilkinson, beginning a large-scale recruitment for a military expedition. Burr discussed seizing control of Mexico or Spanish Florida, or forming a secessionist state in New Orleans or the Western U.S.; historians remain unclear as to his true goal. (Note: Further complicating matters, Wilkinson was posthumously revealed to have been in the simultaneous pay of the British, French, and Spanish.) In the fall of 1806, Burr launched a military flotilla carrying about 60 men down the Ohio River. Wilkinson renounced the plot and reported Burr's expedition to Jefferson, who ordered Burr's arrest. On February 13, 1807, Burr was captured in Louisiana and sent to Virginia to be tried for treason. Burr's 1807 conspiracy trial became a national issue. Jefferson attempted to preemptively influence the verdict by telling Congress that Burr's guilt was "beyond question", but the case came before his longtime political foe, and distant cousin, John Marshall, who dismissed the treason charge. Burr's legal team subpoenaed Jefferson, but Jefferson refused to testify, making the first argument for executive privilege. Instead, Jefferson provided relevant legal documents. After a three-month trial, the jury found Burr not guilty, while Jefferson denounced his acquittal. (Note: Burr then left for Europe and eventually returned to practicing law.) Jefferson subsequently removed Wilkinson as territorial governor but retained him in the U.S. military. Historian James N. Banner criticized Jefferson for continuing to trust Wilkinson, a "faithless plotter".

==== Wilkinson's misconduct ====
Commanding General James Wilkinson was a holdover of the Washington and Adams administrations. In 1804, Wilkinson received 12,000 pesos from the Spanish for information on American boundary plans. Wilkinson also received advances on his salary and payments on claims submitted to Secretary of War Henry Dearborn. This damaging information apparently was unknown to Jefferson. In 1805, Jefferson trusted Wilkinson and appointed him Louisiana Territory governor, admiring Wilkinson's work ethic.

In January 1806, Jefferson received information from Kentucky U.S. Attorney Joseph Davies that Wilkinson was on the Spanish payroll. Jefferson took no action against Wilkinson, since there was not then significant evidence against him. An investigation by the U.S. House of Representatives in December 1807 exonerated Wilkinson. In 1808, a military court looked into the allegations against Wilkinson but also found a lack of evidence. Jefferson retained Wilkinson in the U.S. Army. Evidence found in Spanish archives in the 20th century proved Wilkinson was on the Spanish payroll.

=== Foreign affairs (1805–1809) ===
==== Attempted annexation of Florida ====
In the aftermath of the Louisiana Purchase, Jefferson attempted to annex West Florida from Spain. In his annual message to Congress, on December 3, 1805, Jefferson railed against Spain over Florida border depredations. A few days later Jefferson secretly requested a two-million-dollar expenditure to purchase Florida. Floor leader John Randolph opposed annexation, was upset over Jefferson's secrecy on the matter, and believed the money would end up going to Napoleon. The Two Million Dollar bill passed only after Jefferson successfully maneuvered to replace Randolph with Barnabas Bidwell as floor leader. This aroused suspicion of Jefferson and charges of undue executive influence over Congress. Jefferson signed the bill into law in February 1806. Six weeks later the law was made public. The two million dollars was to be given to France as payment, in turn, to put pressure on Spain to permit the annexation of Florida by the United States. France, however, refused the offer and Florida remained under Spanish control. The failed venture damaged Jefferson's reputation among his supporters.

==== Chesapeake–Leopard affair ====
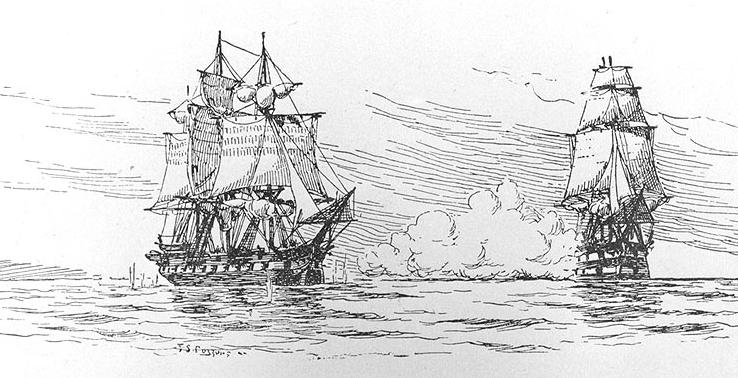
An illustration of HMS Leopard (right) firing on the USS Chesapeake in June 1807

Starting in 1806, the Royal Navy began stopping American merchantmen to search for deserters from the British navy; approximately 6,000 sailors were impressed into the Royal Navy this way, leading to deep anger and resentment among the U.S. public. In 1806, Jefferson issued a call for a boycott of British goods; on April 18, Congress passed the Non-Importation Acts, but they were never enforced. Later that year, Jefferson asked James Monroe and William Pinkney to negotiate an end to foreign interference with American merchant shipping, though relations with Britain showed no signs of improving. The Monroe–Pinkney Treaty was finalized but lacked any provisions regarding the issue of impressment, and Jefferson refused to submit it to the Senate for ratification.

The British warship HMS Leopard encountered the USS Chesapeake off the Virginia coast in June 1807; Leopard fired at Chesapeake after the latter refused to allow for a search for deserters before removing four deserters from the ship. Jefferson issued a proclamation banning British warships from U.S. waters. He presumed unilateral authority to call on the states to prepare 100,000 militia and ordered the purchase of arms, ammunition, and supplies, writing, "The laws of necessity, of self-preservation, of saving our country when in danger, are of higher obligation [than strict observance of written laws]". The USS Revenge was dispatched to demand an explanation from the British government, and Jefferson called for a special session of Congress in October to enact an embargo or alternatively to consider war.

==== Embargo (1807–1809) ====
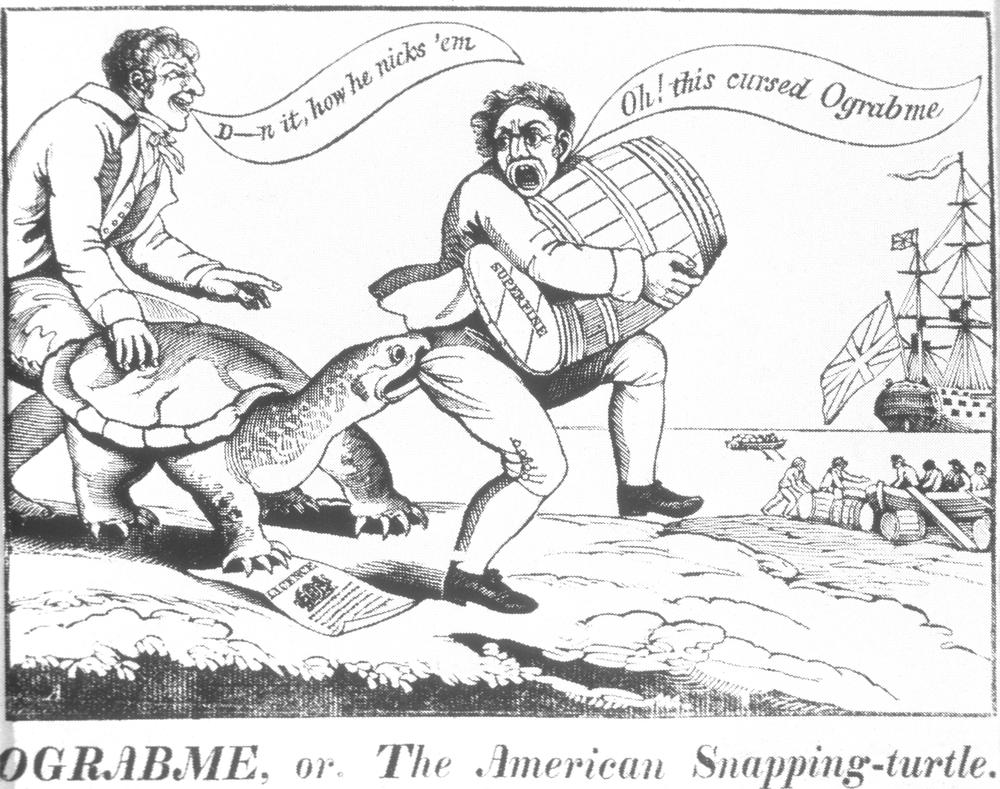
An 1807 political cartoon on the Embargo Act, depicting merchants dodging the "Ograbme", which is "Embargo" spelled backward

In December 1807, news arrived that Napoleon had extended the Berlin Decree, globally banning British imports. The Royal Navy, meanwhile continued to impress sailors from American merchant ships. However, Congress had no appetite to prepare the U.S. for war; Jefferson asked for and received the Embargo Act, an alternative that allowed the U.S. more time to build up defensive works, militias, and naval forces. Meacham argued that the Embargo Act was a projection of power that surpassed the Alien and Sedition Acts, and R. B. Bernstein said that Jefferson "was pursuing policies resembling those he had cited in 1776 as grounds for independence and revolution".

In November 1807, Jefferson, for several days, met with his cabinet to discuss the deteriorating foreign situation. Secretary of State James Madison supported the embargo, while Treasury Secretary Gallatin opposed it, due to its indefinite time frame and the risk to the policy of American neutrality. The U.S. economy suffered, criticism grew, and opponents began evading the embargo. Instead of retreating, Jefferson sent federal agents to secretly track down smugglers and violators. Three acts were passed in Congress during 1807 and 1808, called the Supplementary, the Additional, and the Enforcement acts. The government could not prevent American vessels from trading with the European belligerents once they had left American ports, although the embargo triggered a devastating decline in exports.

In December 1807, Jefferson announced his intention not to seek a third term. He turned his attention increasingly to Monticello during the last year of his presidency, giving Madison and Gallatin almost total control of affairs. Shortly before leaving office in March 1809, Jefferson signed the repeal of the Embargo. In its place, the Non-Intercourse Act was passed, but it proved no more effective. The day before Madison was inaugurated as his successor, Jefferson said that he felt like "a prisoner, released from his chains".

=== Cabinet ===
Jefferson cabinet
Office	Name	Term
President	Thomas Jefferson	1801–1809
Vice President	Aaron Burr	1801–1805
George Clinton	1805–1809
Secretary of State	James Madison	1801–1809
Secretary of the Treasury	Samuel Dexter	1801
Albert Gallatin	1801–1809
Secretary of War	Henry Dearborn	1801–1809
Attorney General	Levi Lincoln Sr.	1801–1805
John Breckinridge	1805–1806
Caesar Augustus Rodney	1807–1809
Secretary of the Navy	Benjamin Stoddert	1801
Robert Smith	1801–1809

== Post-presidency (1809–1826) ==
After his presidency, Jefferson remained influential and continued to correspond with many of the country's leaders (including his two protégées, Madison and Monroe, who succeeded him as president); the Monroe Doctrine strongly resembles solicited advice that Jefferson gave to Monroe in 1823.

=== University of Virginia ===
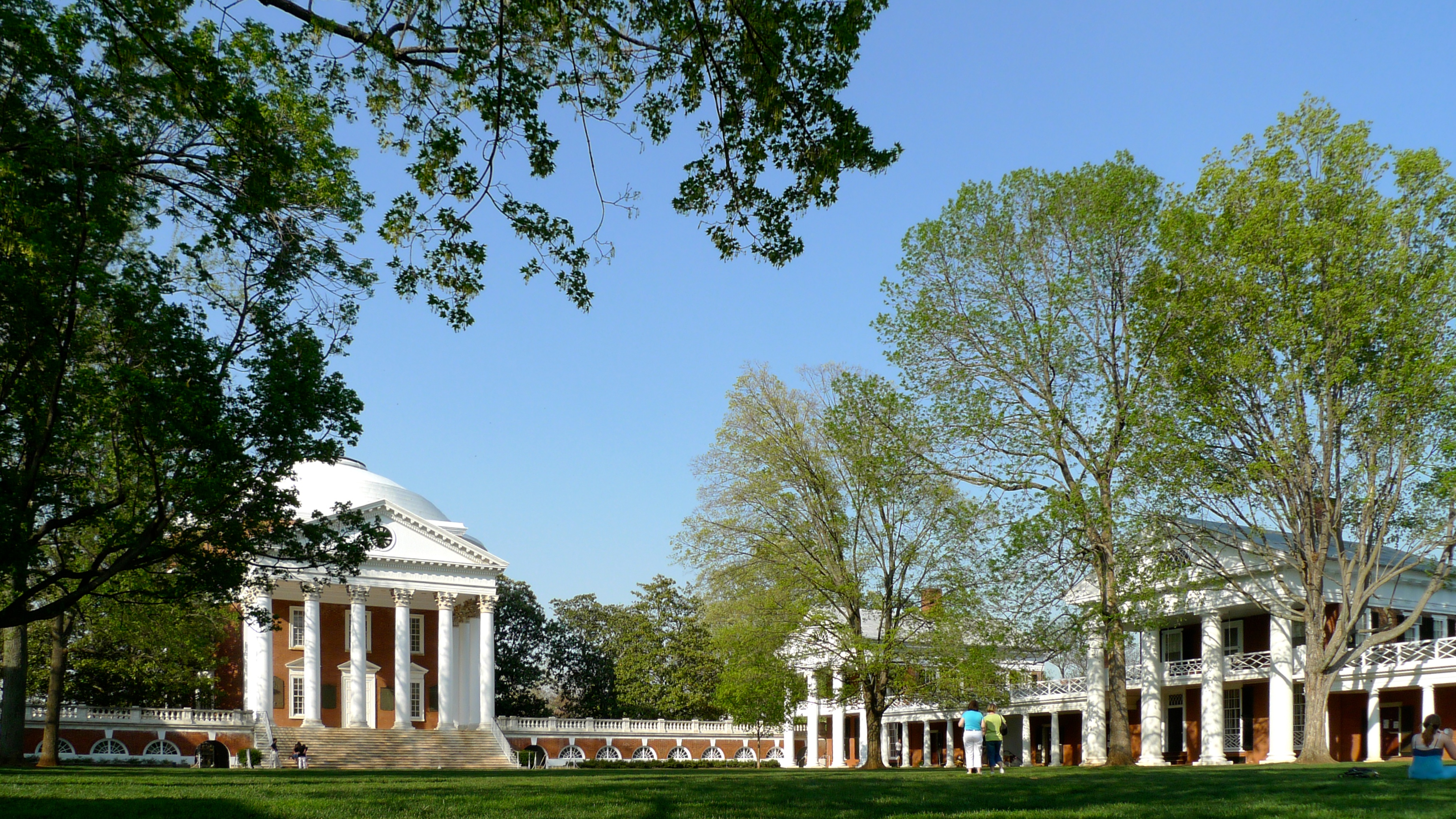
The University of Virginia in Charlottesville, which Jefferson founded in January 1819

Jefferson envisioned a university free of church influences where students could specialize in new areas not offered at other colleges. He believed that education engendered a stable society, which should provide publicly funded schools accessible based solely on ability. He initially proposed his university in a letter to Joseph Priestley in 1800 and, in 1819, founded the University of Virginia. He organized the state legislative campaign for its charter and, with the assistance of Edmund Bacon, purchased the location. He was the principal designer of the buildings, planned the university's curriculum, and served as the first rector upon its opening in 1825.

Jefferson was a strong disciple of Greek and Roman architectural styles, which he believed to be most representative of American democracy. Each academic unit, called a pavilion, was designed with a two-story temple front, while the library "Rotunda" was modeled on the Roman Pantheon. Jefferson referred to the university's grounds as the "Academical Village", and he reflected his educational ideas in its layout. The ten pavilions included classrooms and faculty residences; they formed a quadrangle and were connected by colonnades, behind which stood the student rooms. Gardens and vegetable plots were placed behind the pavilions and were surrounded by serpentine walls, affirming the importance of the agrarian lifestyle. The university had a library rather than a church at its center, emphasizing its secular nature—controversial at the time.

When Jefferson died in 1826, James Madison replaced him as rector. Jefferson bequeathed most of his reconstructed library of almost 2,000 volumes to the university. Only one other ex-president has founded a university; Millard Fillmore founded the University at Buffalo in 1846.

=== Reconciliation with Adams ===
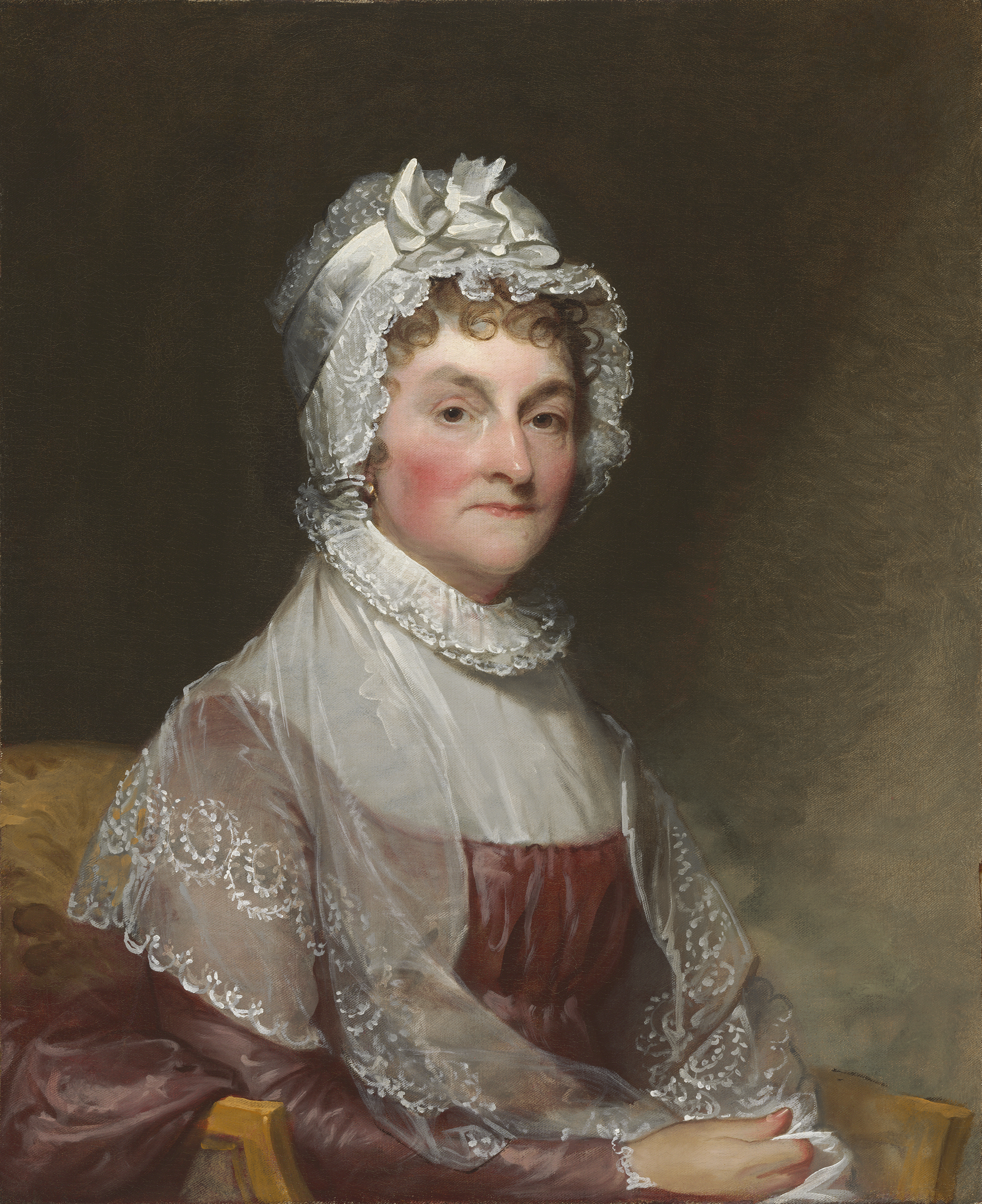
In 1804, Abigail Adams, wife and confidant of John Adams, was one of several people who intervened in an attempt to reconcile differences between Jefferson and John Adams. Jefferson and Adams ultimately reconciled, established a lengthy correspondence and renewed friendship, which historian David McCullough has called "one of the most extraordinary correspondences in American history." On July 4, 1826, the 50th anniversary of the adoption of the Declaration of Independence, Jefferson and Adams died within hours of each other, which then U.S. president John Quincy Adams called "visible and palpable remarks of Divine Favor."

Jefferson and John Adams became good friends in the first decades of their political careers, serving together in the Continental Congress in the 1770s and in Europe in the 1780s. The Federalist/Republican split of the 1790s divided them, however, and Adams felt betrayed by Jefferson's sponsorship of partisan attacks, such as those of James Callender. Jefferson was angered by Adams' appointment of "midnight judges". The two men did not communicate directly for more than a decade after Jefferson succeeded Adams as president. A brief correspondence took place between Abigail Adams and Jefferson after Jefferson's daughter Polly died in 1804, in an attempt at reconciliation unknown to Adams. However, an exchange of letters resumed open hostilities between Adams and Jefferson.

As early as 1809, Benjamin Rush began to prod the two through correspondence to re-establish contact. In 1812, Adams wrote a short New Year's greeting to Jefferson, prompted earlier by Rush, to which Jefferson warmly responded. This initial correspondence began what historian David McCullough calls "one of the most extraordinary correspondences in American history". Over the next 14 years, Jefferson and Adams exchanged 158 letters discussing their political differences, justifying their respective roles in events, and debating the revolution's import to the world.

When Adams died on July 4, 1826, the 50th anniversary of the Declaration of Independence, his last words were an acknowledgment of his longtime friend and rival. "Thomas Jefferson survives", Adams said, unaware that Jefferson had died a few hours earlier.

=== Autobiography ===
In 1821, at the age of 77, Jefferson began writing his Autobiography of Thomas Jefferson: 1743–1790, in which he said he sought to "state some recollections of dates and facts concerning myself". He focused on the struggles and achievements he experienced until July 29, 1790, where the narrative stopped short. He excluded his youth, emphasizing the revolutionary era. He related that his ancestors came from Wales to America in the early 17th century and settled in the western frontier of the Virginia colony, which influenced his zeal for individual and state rights. Jefferson described his father as uneducated, but with a "strong mind and sound judgement". He also addressed his enrollment in the College of William & Mary and his election to the Continental Congress in Philadelphia in 1775.

He expressed opposition to the idea of a privileged aristocracy made up of large landowning families partial to the King, and instead promoted "the aristocracy of virtue and talent, which nature has wisely provided for the direction of the interests of society, & scattered with equal hand through all its conditions, was deemed essential to a well-ordered republic". The work is primarily concerned with the Declaration and reforming the government of Virginia. He used notes, letters, and documents to tell many of the stories. He suggested that this history was so rich that his personal affairs were better overlooked, but he incorporated a self-analysis using the Declaration and other patriotism.

=== Greek War of Independence ===
Thomas Jefferson was a philhellene, lover of Greek culture, who sympathized with the Greek War of Independence. He has been described as the most influential of the Founding Fathers who supported the Greek cause, viewing it as similar to the American Revolution. By 1823, Jefferson was exchanging ideas with Greek scholar Adamantios Korais. Jefferson advised Korais on building the political system of Greece by using classical liberalism and examples from the American governmental system, ultimately prescribing a government akin to that of a U.S. state. He also suggested the application of a classical education system for the newly founded First Hellenic Republic. Jefferson's philosophical instructions were welcomed by the Greek people. Korais became one of the designers of the Greek constitution and urged his associates to study Jefferson's works and other literature from the American Revolution.

=== Lafayette's visit ===
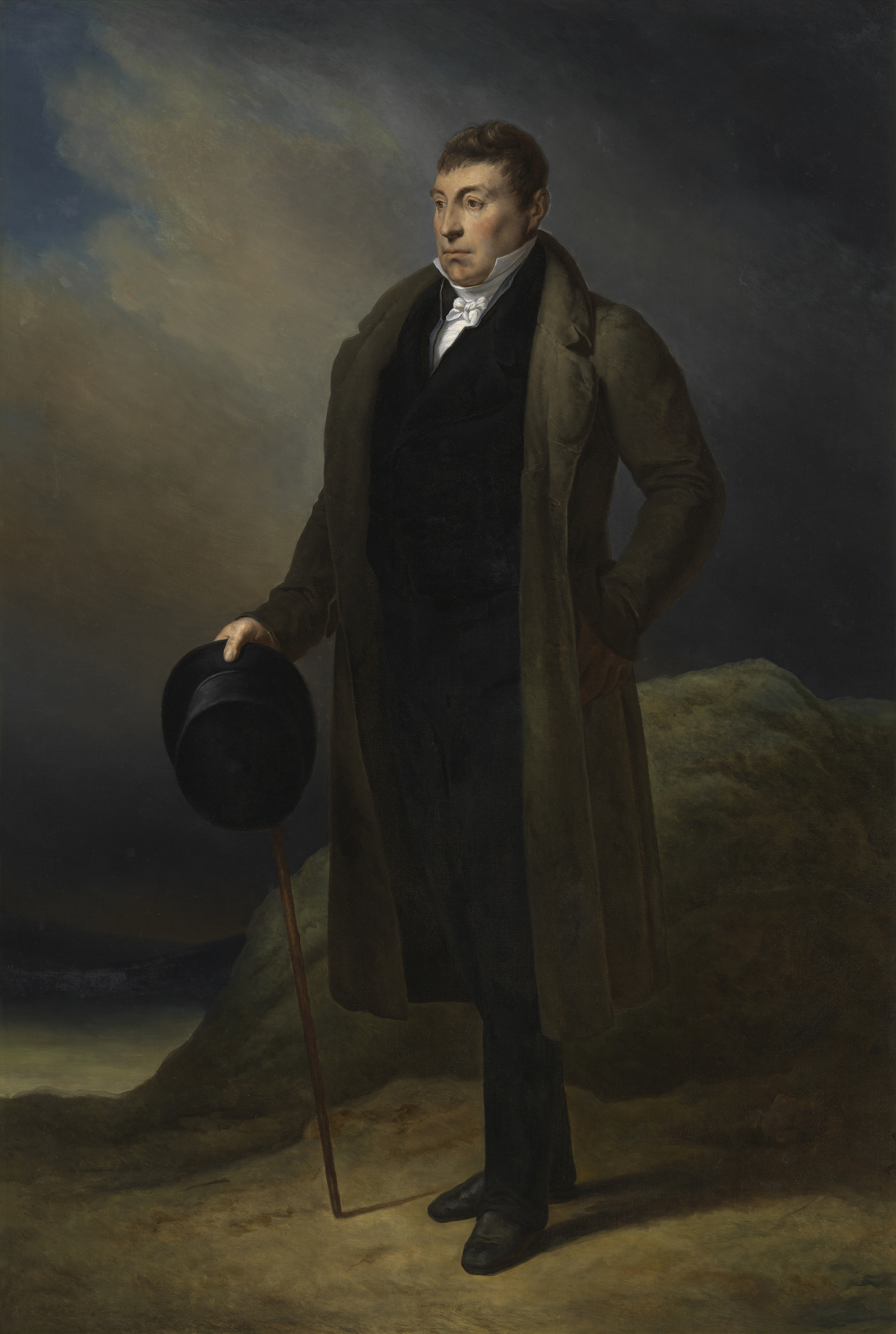
An 1824 portrait of the Marquis de Lafayette by Ary Scheffer

In the summer of 1824, the Marquis de Lafayette accepted an invitation from President James Monroe to visit the country. Jefferson and Lafayette had not seen each other since 1789. After visits to New York, New England, and Washington, Lafayette arrived at Monticello on November 4.

Jefferson's grandson Randolph was present and recorded the reunion: "As they approached each other, their uncertain gait quickened itself into a shuffling run, and exclaiming, 'Ah Jefferson!' 'Ah Lafayette!', they burst into tears as they fell into each other's arms." Jefferson and Lafayette then retired to the house to reminisce. The next morning Jefferson, Lafayette, and James Madison attended a tour and banquet at the University of Virginia. Jefferson had someone else read a speech he had prepared for Lafayette, as his voice was weak and could not carry. This was his last public presentation. After an 11-day visit, Lafayette bid Jefferson goodbye and departed Monticello.

=== Final days, death, and burial ===
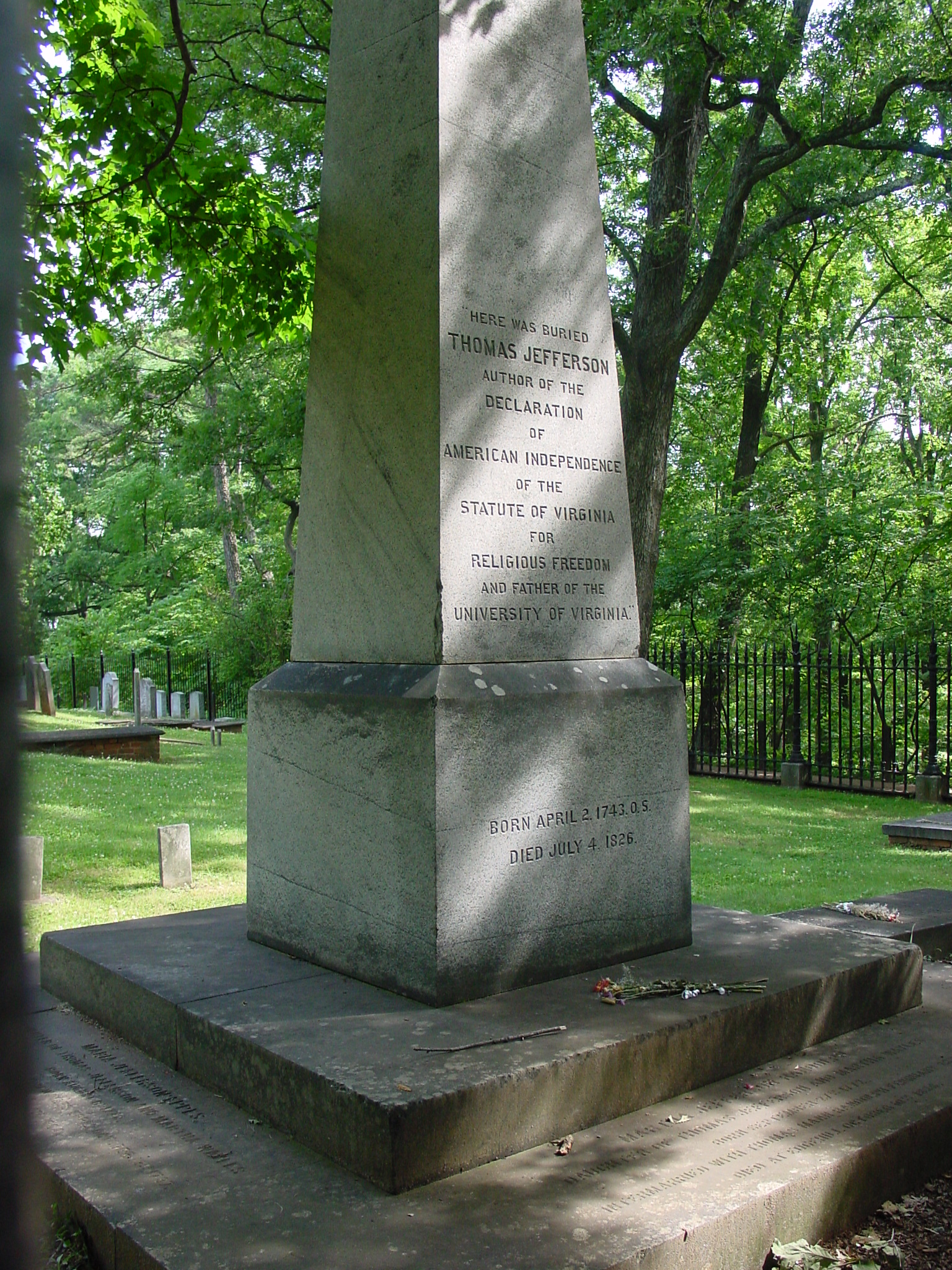
Jefferson's gravesite at Monticello

Jefferson's approximately $100,000 of debt weighed heavily on his mind in his final months, as it became increasingly clear that he would have little to leave to his heirs. In February 1826, he successfully applied to the General Assembly to hold a public lottery as a fundraiser. His health began to deteriorate in July 1825, due to a combination of rheumatism from arm and wrist injuries, and intestinal and urinary disorders. By June 1826, he was confined to bed. On July 3, overcome by fever, Jefferson declined an invitation to attend an anniversary celebration of the Declaration in Washington.

During his last hours, he was accompanied by family members and friends. Jefferson died on July 4, 1826, at 12:50 p.m. at age 83, on the 50th anniversary of the adoption of the Declaration of Independence. In the moments prior to his death, Jefferson instructed his treating physician, "No, doctor, nothing more", refusing laudanum. But his final significant words were, "Is it the Fourth?" or "This is the Fourth". When his predecessor, John Adams, died at approximately 6:20 pm that same day, his last words were "Thomas Jefferson survives", though Adams was unaware that Jefferson had died several hours before. The sitting president was Adams's son, John Quincy Adams, and he called the coincidence of their deaths on the nation's anniversary "visible and palpable remarks of Divine Favor".

Shortly after Jefferson died, attendants found a gold locket on a chain around his neck, containing a small faded blue ribbon around a lock of his wife Martha's hair.

Jefferson was interred at Monticello, under an epitaph that he wrote:

HERE WAS BURIED THOMAS JEFFERSON, AUTHOR OF THE DECLARATION OF AMERICAN INDEPENDENCE, OF THE STATUTE OF VIRGINIA FOR RELIGIOUS FREEDOM, AND FATHER OF THE UNIVERSITY OF VIRGINIA.

As he got older, Jefferson became concerned that people should properly understand the object of the Declaration of Independence, and the people responsible for writing and adopting it. He continually defended himself as its author. He considered the document one of his greatest life achievements, in addition to authoring the Statute of Virginia for Religious Freedom and founding the University of Virginia. Absent from his epitaph were his political roles, including his presidency.

Jefferson died deeply in debt, and was unable to pass on his estate freely to his heirs. He gave instructions in his will for disposal of his assets, including the freeing of Sally Hemings's children; but his estate, possessions, and slaves were sold at public auctions starting in 1827. In 1831, Monticello was sold by Martha Jefferson Randolph and the other heirs.

== Political, social, and religious views ==
Jefferson subscribed to the political ideals expounded by John Locke, Francis Bacon, and Isaac Newton, whom he considered the three greatest men who ever lived. He was also influenced by the writings of Gibbon, Hume, Robertson, Bolingbroke, Montesquieu, and Voltaire. Jefferson thought that the independent yeoman and agrarian life were ideals of republican virtues. He distrusted cities and financiers, favored decentralized government power, and believed that the tyranny that had plagued the common man in Europe was due to corrupt political establishments and monarchies. He supported efforts to disestablish the Church of England, wrote the Virginia Statute for Religious Freedom, and he pressed for a wall of separation between church and state. The Republicans under Jefferson were strongly influenced by the 18th-century British Whig Party, which believed in limited government. His Democratic-Republican Party became dominant in early American politics, and his views became known as Jeffersonian democracy.

=== Philosophy, society, and government ===
Jefferson wrote letters and speeches prolifically; these show him to be well-read in the philosophical literature of his day and of antiquity. Nevertheless, some scholars do not take Jefferson seriously as a philosopher mainly because he did not produce a formal work on philosophy. However, he has been described as one of the most outstanding philosophical figures of his time because his work provided the theoretical background to, and the substance of, the social and political events of the revolutionary years and the development of the American Constitution in the 1770s and 1780s. Jefferson continued to attend to more theoretical questions of natural philosophy and subsequently left behind a rich philosophical legacy in the form of presidential messages, letters, and public papers.

Jefferson described himself as an Epicurean and agreed with Epictetus' works. Jefferson knew Epicurean philosophy from original sources, but also mentioned Pierre Gassendi's Syntagma philosophicum as influencing his ideas on Epicureanism.

According to Jefferson's philosophy, citizens have "certain inalienable rights" and "rightful liberty is unobstructed action according to our will, within limits drawn around us by the equal rights of others". A staunch advocate of the jury system, he proclaimed in 1801, "I consider [trial by jury] as the only anchor yet imagined by man, by which a government can be held to the principles of its constitution." Jeffersonian government not only prohibited individuals in society from infringing on the liberty of others, but also restrained itself from diminishing individual liberty as a protection against tyranny of the majority. Initially, Jefferson favored restricted voting to those who could actually have the free exercise of their reason by escaping any corrupting dependence on others. He advocated enfranchising a majority of Virginians, seeking to expand suffrage to include "yeoman farmers" who owned their own land while excluding tenant farmers, city day laborers, vagrants, most American Indians, and women.

He was convinced that individual liberties were the fruit of political equality, which was threatened by the arbitrary government. Excesses of democracy in his view were caused by institutional corruption rather than human nature. He was less suspicious of a working democracy than many contemporaries. As president, Jefferson feared that the federal system enacted by Washington and Adams had encouraged corrupting patronage and dependence. He tried to restore a balance between the state and federal governments more nearly reflecting the Articles of Confederation, seeking to reinforce state prerogatives where his party was in the majority.

According to Stanford Scholar Jack Rakove, "[w]hen Jefferson wrote 'all men are created equal' in the preamble to the Declaration, he was not talking about individual equality. What he really meant was that the American colonists, as a people, had the same rights of self-government as other peoples, and hence could declare independence, create new governments and assume their 'separate and equal station' among other nations." Jefferson's famous mantra later became a statement "of individual equality that everyone and every member of a deprived group could claim for himself or herself". Historian Henry Wiencek has noted Jefferson included slaves when he penned "all men are created equal" in the Declaration. As early as 1774, Jefferson had supported ending domestic slavery, and making slaves citizens. Later, writing in Notes (1781), Jefferson supported gradual emancipation of slaves, to be sent away from the U.S. to an unspecified place. The former slaves would be replaced by white immigrant workers. In 1792, Jefferson calculated that he was making a 4 percent profit every year on the birth of black children. After this he wrote that slavery presented an investment strategy for the future. Historian Brion Davis writes that Jefferson's emancipation efforts virtually ceased.

Jefferson was steeped in the Whig tradition of the oppressed majority set against a repeatedly unresponsive court party in the Parliament. He justified small outbreaks of rebellion as necessary to get monarchial regimes to amend oppressive measures compromising popular liberties. In a republican regime ruled by the majority, he acknowledged "it will often be exercised when wrong". But "the remedy is to set them right as to facts, pardon and pacify them". As Jefferson saw his party triumph in two terms of his presidency and launch into a third term under James Madison, his view of the U.S. as a continental republic and an "empire of liberty" grew more upbeat. On departing the presidency, he described America as "trusted with the destines of this solitary republic of the world, the only monument of human rights, and the sole depository of the sacred fire of freedom and self-government".

Jefferson was a supporter of American expansionism, writing in 1801 that "it is impossible not to look forward to distant times when our rapid multiplication will expand itself beyond those limits, and cover the whole northern, if not the southern continent".

=== Democracy ===
Portrait of Jefferson in his later years by Thomas Sully, c. 1821

Jefferson considered democracy to be the expression of society and promoted national self-determination, cultural uniformity, and education of all males of the commonwealth. He supported public education and a free press as essential components of a democratic nation.

After resigning as secretary of state in 1793, Jefferson focused on the electoral bases of the Republicans and Federalists. The "Republican" classification for which he advocated included "the entire body of landholders" everywhere and "the body of laborers" without land. Republicans united behind Jefferson as vice president, with the election of 1796 expanding democracy nationwide at grassroots levels. Jefferson promoted Republican candidates for local offices.

Beginning with Jefferson's electioneering for the "revolution of 1800", his political efforts were based on egalitarian appeals. In his later years, he referred to the 1800 election "as real a revolution in the principles of our government as that of '76 was in its form", one "not effected indeed by the sword ... but by the ... suffrage of the people". Voter participation grew during Jefferson's presidency, increasing to "unimaginable levels" compared to the Federalist Era, with turnout of about 67,000 in 1800 rising to about 143,000 in 1804.

At the onset of the American Revolution, Jefferson accepted William Blackstone's argument that property ownership would sufficiently empower voters' independent judgement, but he sought to further expand suffrage by land distribution to the poor. In the heat of the Revolutionary Era and afterward, several states expanded voter eligibility from landed gentry to all propertied male, tax-paying citizens with Jefferson's support. In retirement, he gradually became critical of his home state for violating "the principle of equal political rights"—the social right of universal male suffrage. He sought a "general suffrage" of all taxpayers and militia-men, and equal representation by population in the General Assembly to correct preferential treatment of the slave-holding regions.

=== Religion ===
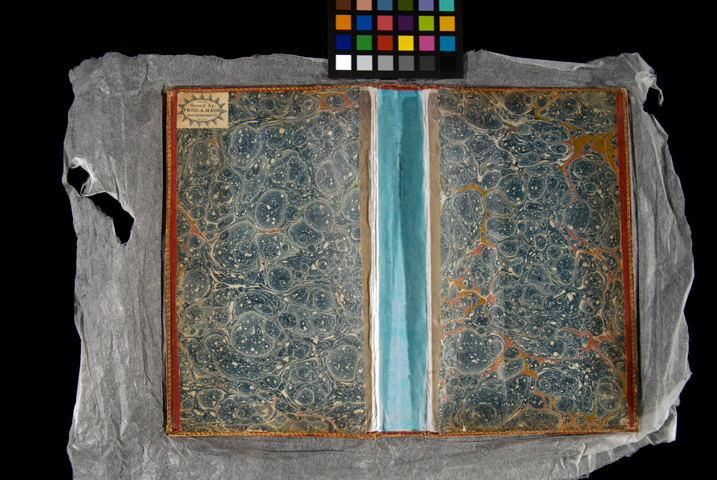
The Jefferson Bible, which features only the words of Jesus from his disciples, written in parallel Greek, Latin, French, and English

Baptized in his youth, Jefferson became a governing member of his local Episcopal Church in Charlottesville, which he later attended with his daughters. Jefferson, however, spurned Biblical views of Christianity. Influenced by Deist authors during his college years, Jefferson abandoned mainstream Christianity after his review of New Testament teachings. Jefferson has sometimes been portrayed as a follower of the liberal religious strand of Deism that values reason over revelation. Nonetheless, in 1803, Jefferson asserted, "I am Christian, in the only sense in which [Jesus] wished any one to be".

Later, influenced by prominent Unitarian theologist, Joseph Priestley, Jefferson selected New Testament passages of Jesus' teachings into a private work he called The Life and Morals of Jesus of Nazareth, known today as the Jefferson Bible, which was never published during his lifetime. Jefferson believed that Jesus' message had been obscured and corrupted by Paul the Apostle, the Gospel writers and Protestant reformers. Peterson states that Jefferson was a theist "whose God was the Creator of the universe ... all the evidences of nature testified to His perfection; and man could rely on the harmony and beneficence of His work". In a letter to John Adams, Jefferson wrote that what he believed was genuinely Christ's, found in the Gospels, was "as easily distinguishable as diamonds in a dunghill". By omitting miracles and the resurrection, Jefferson made the figure of Jesus more compatible with a worldview based on reason, and defined being a Christian as one who followed the simple teachings of Jesus.

Jefferson was firmly anticlerical, writing in "every age, the priest has been hostile to liberty ... they have perverted the purest religion ever preached to man into mystery and jargon." The full letter to Horatio Spatford can be read at the National Archives. Jefferson once supported banning clergy from public office but later relented. In 1777, he drafted the Virginia Statute for Religious Freedom. Ratified in 1786, it made compelling attendance or contributions to any state-sanctioned religious establishment illegal and declared that men "shall be free to profess ... their opinions in matters of religion". The Statute is one of only three accomplishments he chose for his epitaph. Early in 1802, Jefferson wrote to the Danbury Connecticut Baptist Association that "religion is a matter which lies solely between Man and his God". He interpreted the First Amendment as having built "a wall of separation between Church and State". The phrase 'Separation of Church and State' has been cited several times by the Supreme Court in its interpretation of the Establishment Clause.

Jefferson donated to the American Bible Society, saying the Four Evangelists delivered a "pure and sublime system of morality" to humanity. He thought Americans would rationally create "Apiarian" religion, extracting the best traditions of every denomination. He contributed generously to several local denominations near Monticello. Acknowledging organized religion would always be factored into political life, he encouraged reason over supernatural revelation to make inquiries into religion. He believed in a creator god, an afterlife, and the sum of religion as loving God and neighbors. But he also controversially rejected fundamental Christian beliefs, denying the conventional Christian Trinity, Jesus's divinity as the Son of God and miracles, the Resurrection of Christ, atonement from sin, and original sin. Jefferson believed that original sin was a gross injustice.

Jefferson's unorthodox religious beliefs became an important issue in the 1800 presidential election. Federalists attacked him as an atheist. As president, Jefferson countered the accusations by praising religion in his inaugural address and attending services at the Capitol. Jefferson broadly agreed with the Unitarian view on Christianity, believing in one creator god, but denying the Trinity and resurrection. Further, in 1822, Jefferson wrote, "I confidently expect that the present generation will see Unitarianism become the general religion of the United States."

=== Banks ===
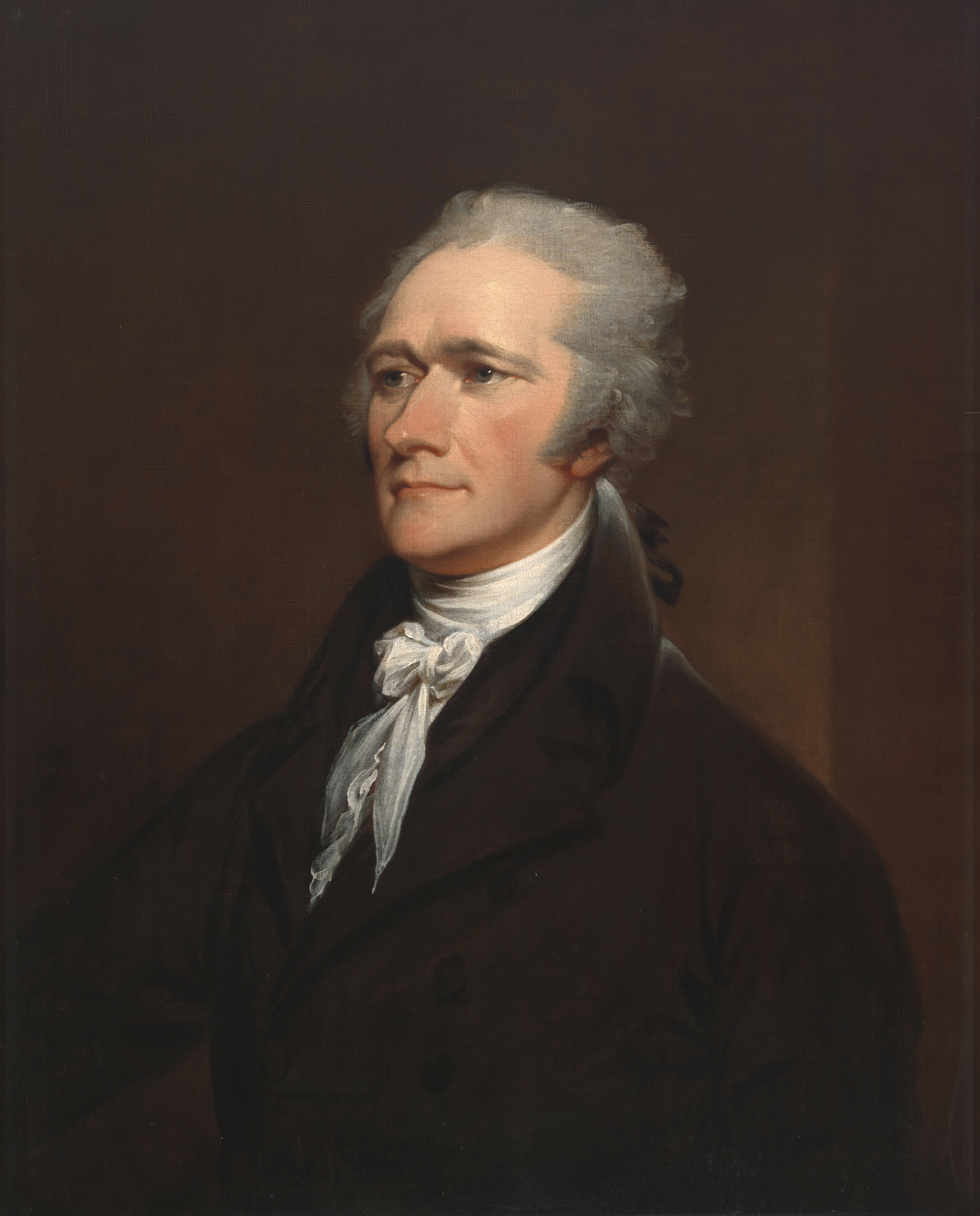
Jefferson opposed Treasury Secretary Alexander Hamilton's proposal to establish a government bank, and the two emerged as political rivals during George Washington's presidency.

Jefferson distrusted government banks and opposed public borrowing, which he thought created long-term debt, bred monopolies, and invited dangerous speculation as opposed to productive labor. In one letter to Madison, he argued each generation should curtail all debt within 19 years, and not impose a long-term debt on subsequent generations.

In another letter to John Taylor, Jefferson wrote,

Banking establishments are more dangerous than standing armies; & that the principle of spending money to be paid by posterity, under the name of funding, is but swindling futurity on a large scale.

In 1791, President Washington asked Jefferson, then secretary of state, and Hamilton, the secretary of the treasury, if the Congress had the authority to create a national bank. While Hamilton believed so, Jefferson and Madison thought a national bank would ignore the needs of individuals and farmers, and would violate the Tenth Amendment by assuming powers not granted to the federal government by the states. Hamilton successfully argued that the implied powers given to the federal government in the Constitution supported the creation of a national bank, among other federal actions.

Jefferson used agrarian resistance to banks and speculators as the first defining principle of an opposition party, recruiting candidates for Congress on the issue as early as 1792. As president, Jefferson was persuaded by Secretary of the Treasury Albert Gallatin to leave the bank intact but sought to restrain its influence. (Note: The First Bank of the U.S. was eventually abolished in 1811 by a heavily Republican Congress.)

=== Slavery ===
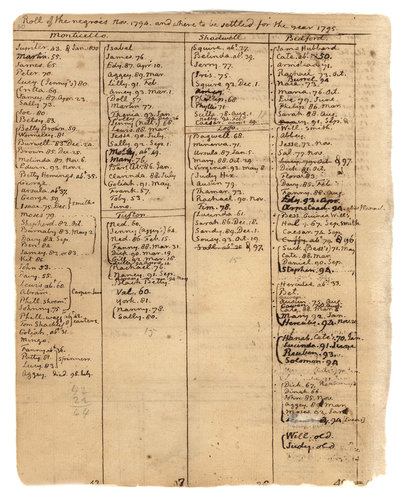
Page 30 of Jefferson's 1795 Farm Book, which lists 163 slaves at Monticello

Scholars give radically differing interpretations on Jefferson's views and relationship with slavery. Opinions range from "emancipationists" who view him as an early proto-abolitionist, who subsequently made pragmatic compromises with the slave power to preserve the union; to "revisionists", who argue that he in fact entrenched the institution in American society; with people also having more nuanced opinions, either arguing that Jefferson held inconsistent views on the institution throughout his lifetime or that both interpretations are too overly simplistic.

Jefferson lived in a planter economy largely dependent upon slavery, and as a wealthy landholder, used slave labor for his household, plantation, and workshops. He first recorded his slaveholding in 1774, when he counted 41 enslaved people. Over his lifetime he enslaved about 600 people; he inherited about 175 people while most of the remainder were people born on his plantations. Jefferson purchased some slaves in order to reunite their families. He sold approximately 110 people for economic reasons, primarily slaves from his outlying farms. In 1784, when the number of people he enslaved likely was approximately 200, he began to divest himself of many slaves, and by 1794 he had divested himself of 161 individuals. (Note: The 135 slaves, which included Betty Hemings and her ten children, that Jefferson acquired from Wayles's estate made him the second-largest slave owner in Albemarle County with a total of 187 slaves. The number fluctuated from around 200 slaves until 1784 when he began to give away or sell slaves. By 1794 he had gotten rid of 161 individuals.)

Approximately 100 slaves lived at Monticello at any given time. In 1817, the plantation recorded its largest slave population of 140 individuals.

Jefferson once said, "My first wish is that the labourers may be well treated". Jefferson did not work his slaves on Sundays and Christmas and he allowed them more personal time during the winter months. Some scholars doubt Jefferson's benevolence, noting cases of excessive slave whippings in his absence. His nail factory was staffed only by enslaved children. Many of the enslaved boys became tradesmen. Burwell Colbert, who started his working life as a child in Monticello's Nailery, was later promoted to the supervisory position of butler.

Jefferson felt slavery was harmful to both slave and master but had reservations about releasing slaves from captivity, and advocated for gradual emancipation. In 1779, he proposed gradual voluntary training and resettlement to the Virginia legislature, and three years later drafted legislation allowing slaveholders to free their own slaves. In his draft of the Declaration of Independence, he included a section, stricken by other Southern delegates, criticizing King George III for supposedly forcing slavery onto the colonies. In 1784, Jefferson proposed the abolition of slavery in all western U.S. territories, limiting slave importation to 15 years. Congress, however, failed to pass his proposal by one vote. In 1787, Congress passed the Northwest Ordinance, a partial victory for Jefferson that terminated slavery in the Northwest Territory. Jefferson freed his slave Robert Hemings in 1794 and he freed his cook slave James Hemings in 1796. Jefferson freed his runaway slave Harriet Hemings in 1822. Upon his death in 1826, Jefferson freed five male Hemings slaves in his will.

During his presidency, Jefferson allowed the diffusion of slavery into the Louisiana Territory hoping to prevent slave uprisings in Virginia and to prevent South Carolina secession. In 1804, in a compromise, Jefferson and Congress banned domestic slave trafficking for one year into the Louisiana Territory. In 1806 he officially called for anti-slavery legislation terminating the import or export of slaves. Congress passed the law in 1807.

In 1819, Jefferson strongly opposed a Missouri statehood application amendment, which banned domestic slave importation and freed slaves at the age of 25 on grounds that it would destroy the union. In Notes on the State of Virginia, he created controversy by calling slavery a moral evil for which the nation would ultimately have to account to God. Jefferson wrote of his "suspicion" that Black people were mentally and physically inferior to Whites, but argued that they nonetheless had innate human rights. He therefore supported colonization plans that would transport freed slaves to another country, such as Liberia or Sierra Leone, though he recognized the impracticability of such proposals. According to Eric Foner, "In 1824 Jefferson proposed that the federal government purchase and deport 'the increase of each year' (that is, children), so that the slave population would age and eventually disappear."

During his presidency, Jefferson was for the most part publicly silent on the issue of slavery and emancipation, as the Congressional debate over slavery and its extension caused a dangerous north–south rift among the states, with talk of a northern confederacy in New England. (Note: Aaron Burr was offered help in obtaining the governorship of New York by Timothy Pickering if he could persuade New York to go along, but the secession effort failed when Burr lost the election.) The violent attacks on white slave owners during the Haitian Revolution due to injustices under slavery supported Jefferson's fears of a race war, increasing his reservations about promoting emancipation. After numerous attempts and failures to bring about emancipation, Jefferson wrote privately in an 1805 letter to William A. Burwell, "I have long since given up the expectation of any early provision for the extinguishment of slavery among us." That same year he also related this idea to George Logan, writing, "I have most carefully avoided every public act or manifestation on that subject."

==== Jefferson–Hemings controversy ====
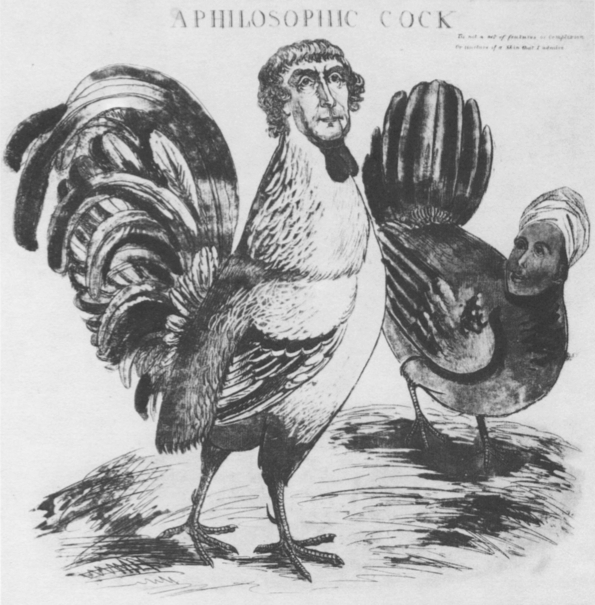
An 1804 cartoon depicting Jefferson as a rooster and Sally Hemings as a hen

Claims that Jefferson fathered children with his slave Sally Hemings after his wife's death have been debated since 1802. In that year James T. Callender, after being denied a position as postmaster, alleged Jefferson had taken Hemings as a concubine and fathered several children with her. The allegations were further broadcast by the popular Irish satirist and poet Thomas Moore: "The weary statesman for repose has fled/ From the halls of council to his negro shed/ Where blest he woes some black Aspasia's grace/ And dreams of freedom in his slave's embrace!" The work containing the vitriolic couplet was immediately reprinted by two Philadelphia publishers, the first of several American editions.

In 1998, a panel of researchers conducted a Y-DNA study of living descendants of Jefferson's uncle, Field, and of a descendant of Hemings's son, Eston Hemings. The results showed a match with the male Jefferson line. Subsequently, the Thomas Jefferson Foundation (TJF) formed a nine-member research team of historians to assess the matter. The TJF report concluded that "the DNA study ... indicates a high probability that Thomas Jefferson fathered Eston Hemings". (Note: The minority report authored by White Wallenborn concluded "the historical evidence is not substantial enough to confirm nor for that matter to refute his paternity of any of the children of Sally Hemings. The DNA studies certainly enhance the possibility but ... do not prove Thomas Jefferson's paternity".) The TJF also concluded that Jefferson likely fathered all of Hemings's children listed at Monticello. (Note: Sally Heming's children recorded at Monticello included: "Harriet (born 1795; died in infancy); Beverly (born 1798); an unnamed daughter (born 1799; died in infancy); Harriet (born 1801); Madison (born 1805); and Eston (born 1808)".)

In July 2017, the TJF announced that archeological excavations at Monticello had revealed what they believe to have been Sally Hemings's quarters, adjacent to Jefferson's bedroom. Since the results of the DNA tests were made public, the consensus among most historians has been that Jefferson had a sexual relationship with Sally Hemings and that he was the father of her son Eston Hemings.

A minority of scholars maintain the evidence is insufficient to prove Jefferson's paternity conclusively. Based on DNA and other evidence, they note the possibility that additional Jefferson males, including his brother Randolph Jefferson and any one of Randolph's four sons, or his cousin, could have fathered Sally Hemings's children. In 2002, historian Merrill Peterson said: "in the absence of direct documentary evidence either proving or refuting the allegation, nothing conclusive can be said about Jefferson's relations with Sally Hemings." Concerning the 1998 DNA study, Peterson said that "the results of the DNA testing of Jefferson and Hemings descendants provided support for the idea that Jefferson was the father of at least one of Sally Hemings's children".

After Jefferson's death in 1826, although not formally manumitted, Sally Hemings was allowed by Jefferson's daughter Martha to live in Charlottesville as a free woman with her two sons until her death in 1835. (Note: Annette Gordon-Reed notes that it would have been legally challenging to free Sally Hemings, due to Virginia laws mandating the support of older slaves and requiring special permission for freed slaves to remain within the state.) The Monticello Association refused to allow Sally Hemings' descendants the right of burial at Monticello.

In 2026, anthropologist Richard Kurin authored a book detailing testing of hair labeled as having been cut from Jefferson to DNA of Hemings descendants. Kurin asserted that the findings demonstrated with "great certainty" that Jefferson fathered children with Hemings. However, critics pointed out that the findings were not peer-reviewed, and one of the Hemings descendants who participated withdrew after becoming troubled by Kurin's methods.

== Interests and activities ==
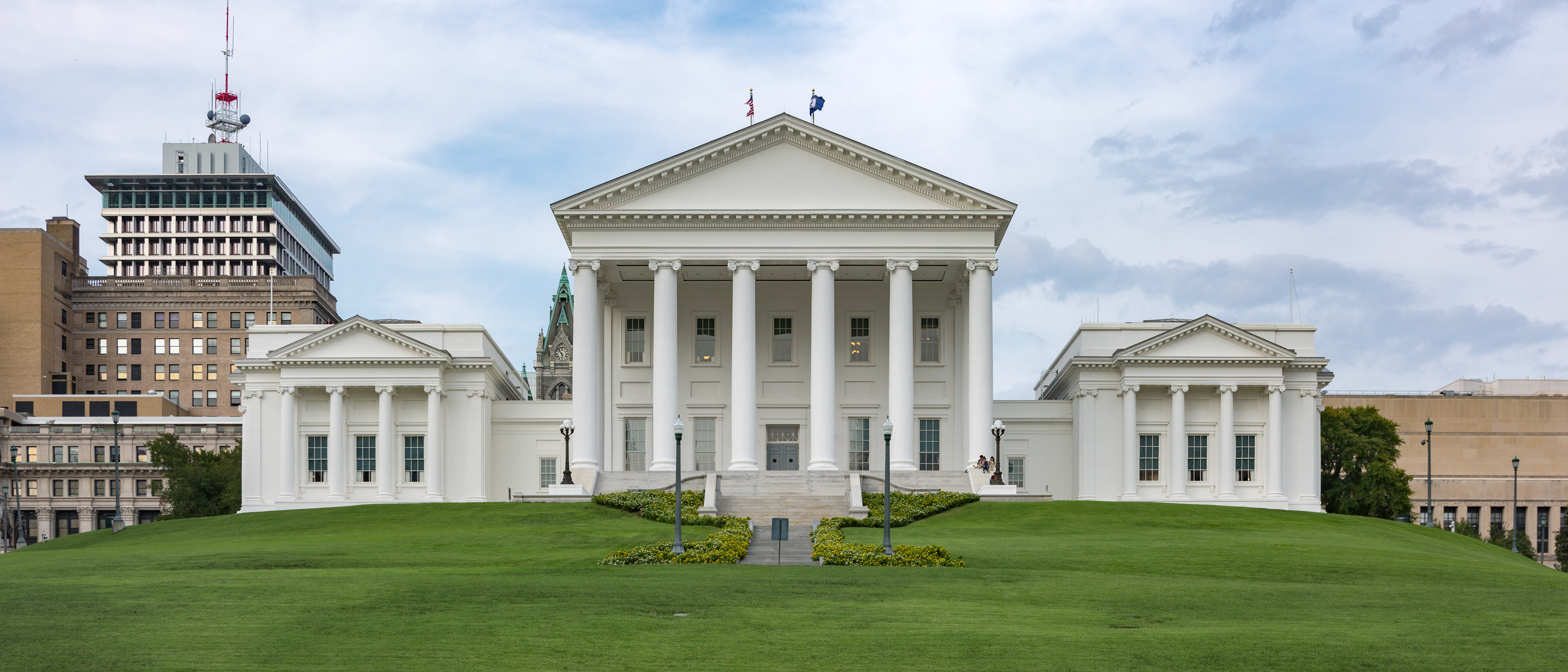
Virginia State Capitol in Richmond, which Jefferson designed

Jefferson was a farmer, obsessed with new crops, soil conditions, garden designs, and scientific agricultural techniques. His main cash crop was tobacco, but its price was usually low and it was rarely profitable. He tried to achieve self-sufficiency with wheat, vegetables, flax, corn, and livestock, but he lived perpetually beyond his means and was always in debt. Jefferson also planted two vineyards at Monticello and hoped to make wine, but the crop failed. His efforts were nonetheless an important contribution to the development of American viticulture.

Jefferson mastered architecture through self-study. His primary authority was Andrea Palladio's 1570 The Four Books of Architecture. Jefferson helped popularize the Neo-Palladian style in the United States, utilizing designs for the Virginia State Capitol, the University of Virginia, Monticello, and others.

In archaeology in 1784, Jefferson, using the trench method, started excavating a Monacan burial mound in Virginia. His excavations were prompted by him noticing local Native Americans visiting the site and the "Moundbuilders" question. His methods allowed him to witness the stratigraphic layout, the various human remains and other artifacts inside the mound. The evidence present at the site led him to admit that he saw no reason why the ancestors of the present-day Native Americans could not have raised those mounds.

He was interested in birds and wine, and was a noted gourmet. As a naturalist, he was fascinated by the Natural Bridge geological formation, and in 1774 successfully acquired the Bridge by a grant from George III. As an advocate of Enlightenment ideals, Jefferson studied many aspects of the natural sciences and frequently corresponded, and even hosted on multiple occasions, with Prussian explorer, Alexander von Humboldt.

=== American Philosophical Society ===
Jefferson was a member of the American Philosophical Society for 35 years, beginning in 1780. Through the society he advanced the sciences and Enlightenment ideals, emphasizing that knowledge of science reinforced and extended freedom. His Notes on the State of Virginia was written in part as a contribution to the society. He became the society's third president on March 3, 1797, a few months after he was elected Vice President of the United States.

On March 10, 1797, Jefferson gave a lecture, later published as a paper in 1799, which reported on the skeletal remains of an extinct large sloth, which he named Megalonyx, unearthed by saltpeter workers from a cave in what is now Monroe County, West Virginia. Jefferson is considered to be a pioneer of scientific paleontology research in North America.

Jefferson served as APS president for the next eighteen years, including through both terms of his presidency. He introduced Meriwether Lewis to the society, where various scientists tutored him in preparation for the Lewis and Clark Expedition. He resigned on January 20, 1815, but remained active through correspondence.

=== Linguistics ===
Jefferson had a lifelong interest in linguistics, and could speak, read, and write in a number of languages, including French, Greek, Italian, and German. In his early years, he excelled in classical languages. Jefferson later came to regard Greek as the "perfect language" as expressed in its laws and philosophy. While attending the College of William & Mary, he taught himself Italian. Here Jefferson first became familiar with the Anglo-Saxon language, studying it in a linguistic and philosophical capacity. He owned 17 volumes of Anglo-Saxon texts and grammar and later wrote an essay on the Anglo-Saxon language. Jefferson claimed to have taught himself Spanish during his nineteen-day journey to France, using only a grammar guide and a copy of Don Quixote.

Linguistics played a significant role in how Jefferson modeled and expressed political and philosophical ideas. He believed that the study of ancient languages was essential in understanding the roots of modern language. Jefferson criticized language purists and supported the introduction of neologisms to English, foreseeing the emergence of "an American dialect". He described the Académie Française, a body designated to regulate the French language, as an "endeavor to arrest the progress of their language".

He collected and understood a number of Native American vocabularies and instructed Lewis and Clark to record and collect various indigenous languages during their Expedition. When Jefferson moved from Washington after his presidency, he took 50 Native American vocabulary lists back to Monticello along with the rest of his possessions. Somewhere along the journey, a thief stole the heavy chest, thinking it was full of valuables, but its contents were dumped into the James River when the thief discovered it was only filled with papers. Thirty years of collecting were lost, with only a few fragments rescued from the muddy banks of the river.

Jefferson was not an outstanding orator and preferred to communicate through writing. Instead of delivering his State of the Union addresses himself, Jefferson wrote the annual messages and sent a representative to read them aloud in Congress, which started a tradition that continued until 1913.

=== Inventions ===
Jefferson invented many small practical devices and improved contemporary inventions, including a revolving book-stand and a "Great Clock" powered by the gravitational pull on cannonballs. He improved the pedometer, the polygraph (a device for duplicating writing), and the moldboard plow, an idea he never patented and gave to posterity. Jefferson can also be credited as the creator of the swivel chair, the first of which he created and used to write much of the Declaration of Independence. He first opposed patents but later supported them. From 1790 to 1793, as Secretary of State, he was the ex officio head of the three-person patent review board. He drafted reforms of US patent law which led to him being relieved of this duty in 1793, and also drastically changed the patent system.

As Minister to France, Jefferson was impressed by the military standardization program known as the Système Gribeauval, and initiated a program as president to develop interchangeable parts for firearms. For his inventiveness and ingenuity, Jefferson was awarded an honorary Doctor of Law degree from Harvard University in 1787.

=== Music ===
Jefferson had a lifelong interest in music, calling it "the favorite passion of my soul". He played the violin and cello. He was reportedly able to play the violin well enough to perform in weekly concerts at the Governor's Palace. Several thousand volumes of sheet music that Jefferson gave to the U.S. government started the Library of Congress.

== Legacy ==
=== Historical reputation ===
Jefferson is seen as an icon of individual liberty, democracy, and republicanism, hailed as the author of the Declaration of Independence, an architect of the American Revolution, and a renaissance man who promoted science and scholarship. The participatory democracy and expanded suffrage he championed defined his era and became a standard for later generations. Jon Meacham opined that Jefferson was the most influential figure of the democratic republic in its first half-century, succeeded by presidential adherents James Madison, James Monroe, Andrew Jackson, and Martin Van Buren. A Siena Research Institute poll of presidential scholars, which began in 1982, has consistently ranked Jefferson as one of the five best U.S. presidents, and a 2015 Brookings Institution poll of American Political Science Association members ranked him as the fifth-greatest president.

=== Memorials and honors ===
Jefferson has been memorialized with buildings, sculptures, postage, and currency. In the 1920s, Jefferson, together with George Washington, Theodore Roosevelt, and Abraham Lincoln, was chosen by sculptor Gutzon Borglum to be depicted in a stone national memorial at Mount Rushmore. The Jefferson Memorial was dedicated in Washington, D.C., in 1943, on the 200th anniversary of Jefferson's birth. The interior of the memorial includes a 19-foot (6 m) statue of Jefferson by Rudulph Evans and engravings of passages from Jefferson's writings.

Several species have been named after Jefferson, both during and after his life. Most notable is from a fossil taxon of ground sloths, †Megalonyx. Jefferson himself had defined the genus in 1799 without naming a species. The species of the type fossil would be classified †M. jeffersonii (Jefferson's ground sloth) in honor of Jefferson by Anselme Gaëtan Desmarest in 1822. The flower genus Jeffersonia (Barton, 1793) and Virginia's state fossil †Chesapecten jeffersonius (Say, 1824) were also named after Jefferson during his lifetime. After his death, †Carabus jeffersoni (Scudder, 1900); †Mammuthus jeffersonii (Osborn, 1922); Brachypanorpa jeffersoni (Byers, 1976); †Boreogomphodon jeffersoni (Sues & Olsen, 1990); and Coiba jeffersoni (Kula, 2009) were named in his honor.

In October 2021, in response to lobbying, the New York City Public Design Commission voted unanimously to remove the plaster model of the statue of Jefferson that currently stands in the United States Capitol rotunda from the chamber of the New York City Council, where it had been for more than a century, due to him fathering children with people he enslaved.

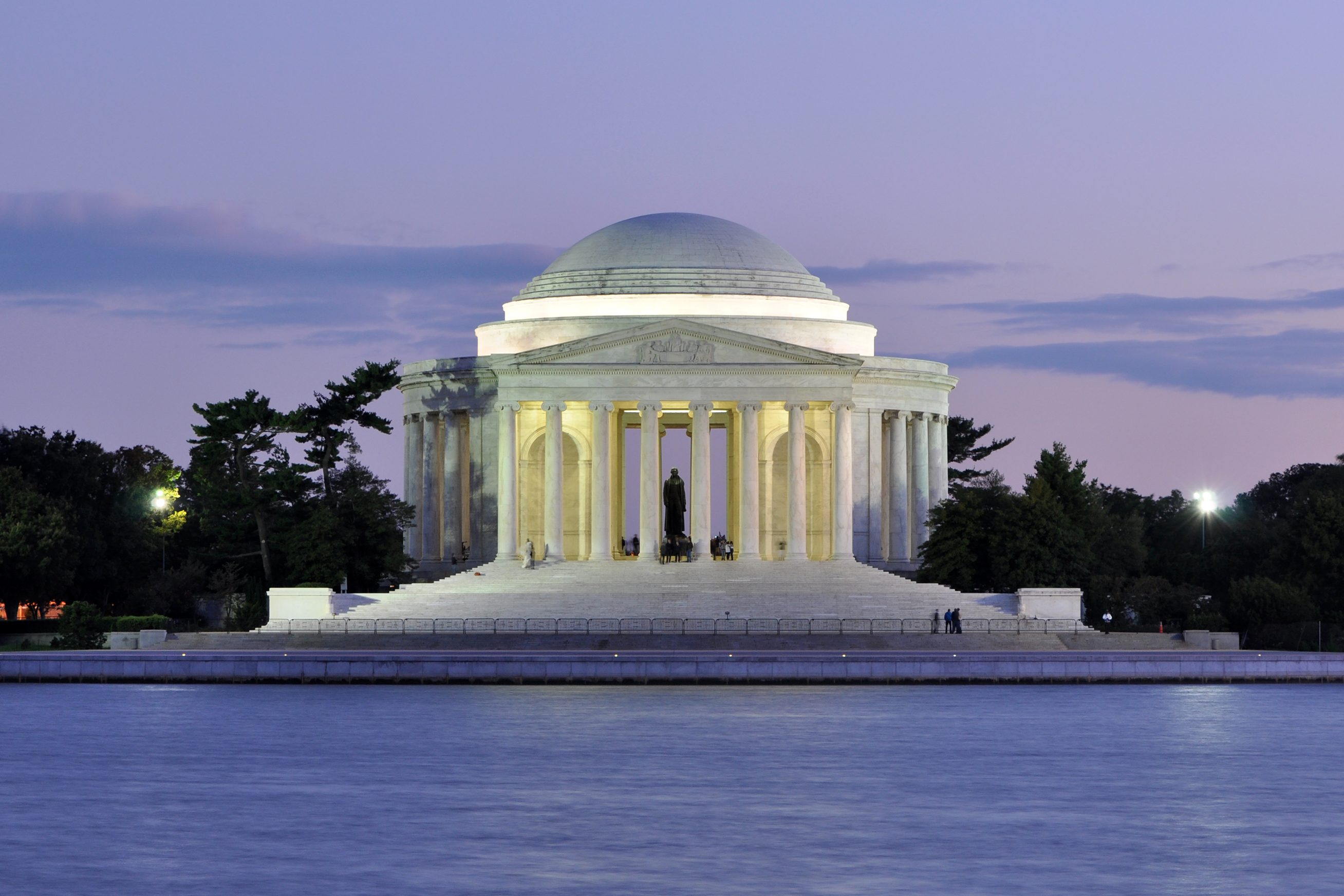
Jefferson Memorial in Washington, D.C.

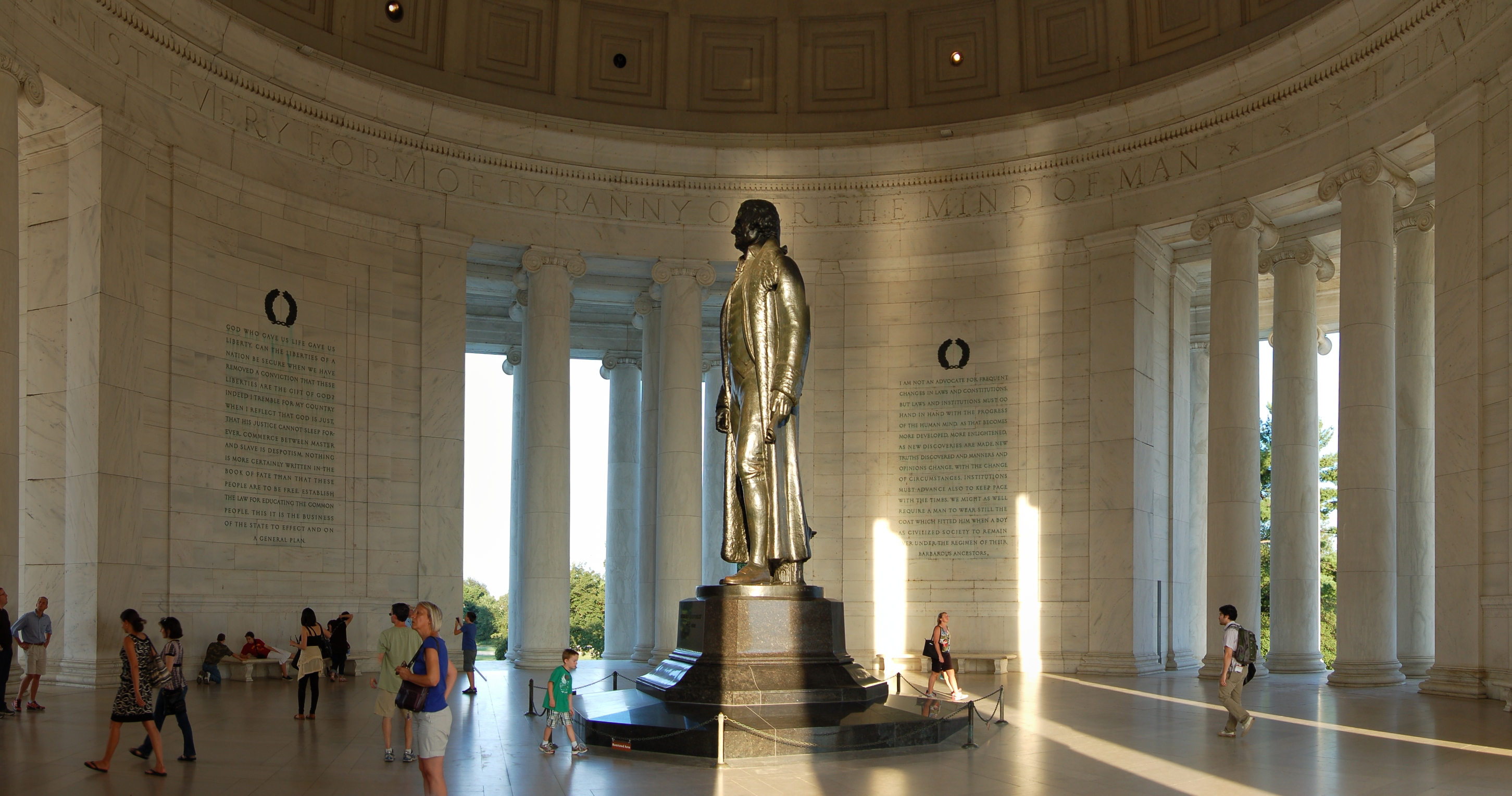
Jefferson Memorial statue by Rudulph Evans, 1947

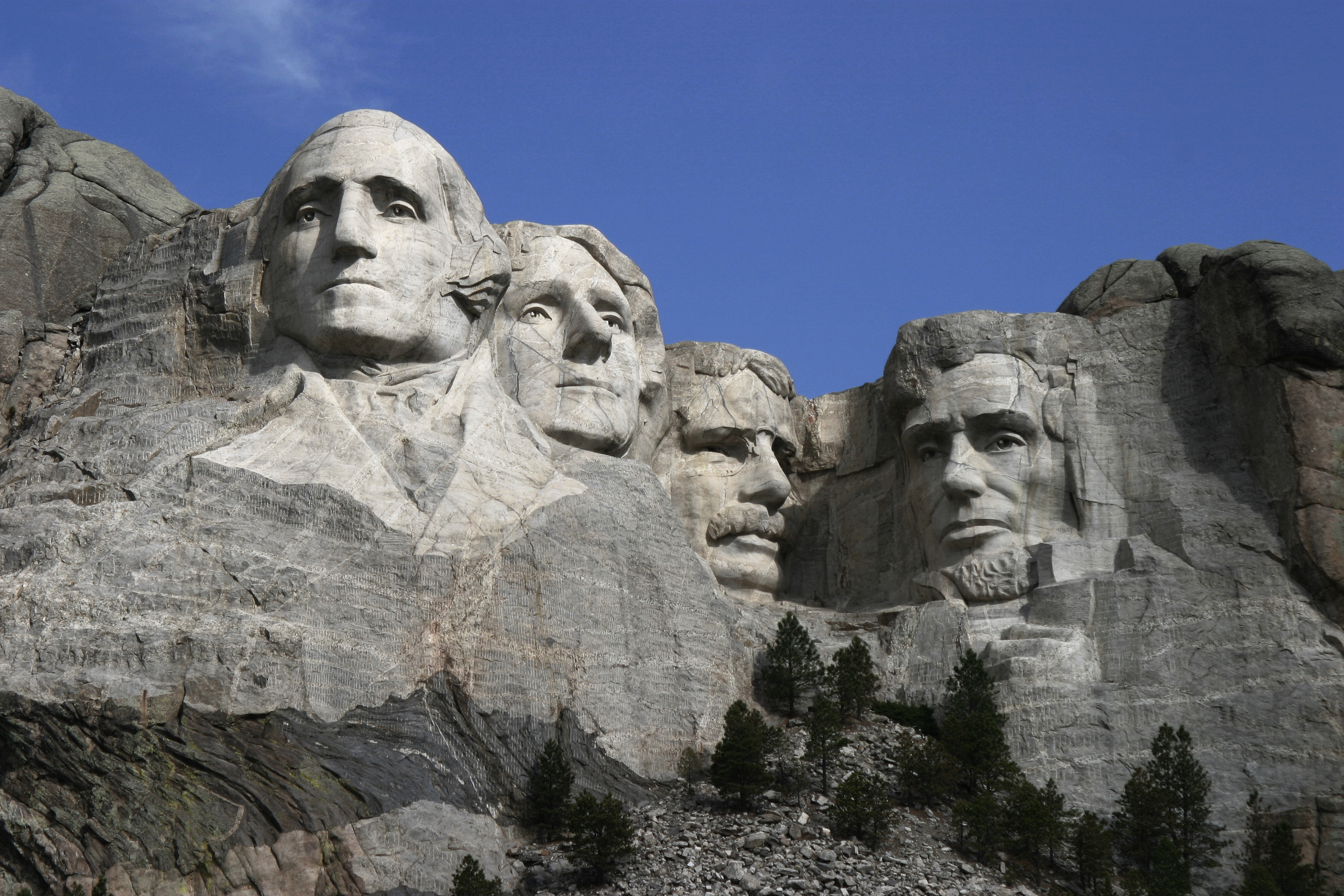
Mount Rushmore (Shrine of Democracy) by Gutzon Borglum. From left to right: Washington, Jefferson, Roosevelt, and Lincoln.

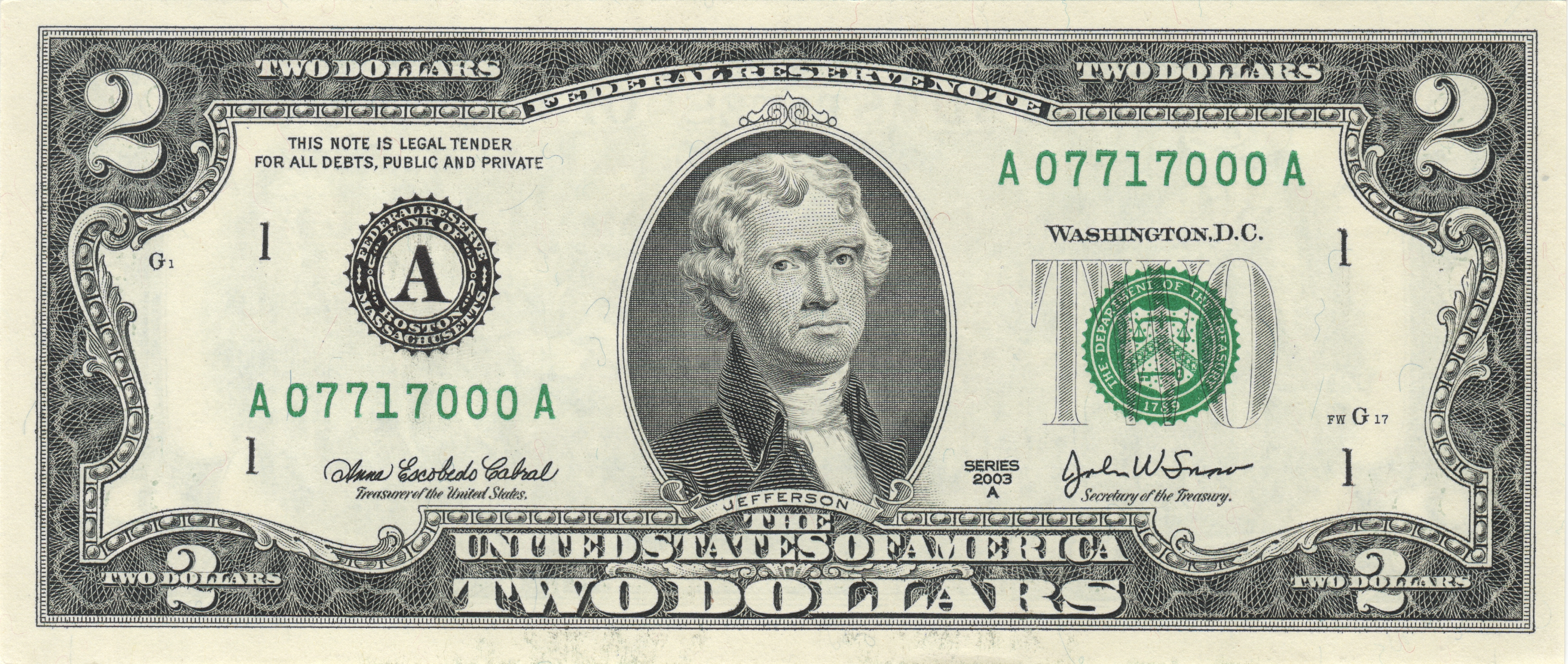
Jefferson has been featured on the U.S. two-dollar bill from 1928 to 1966 and since 1976.

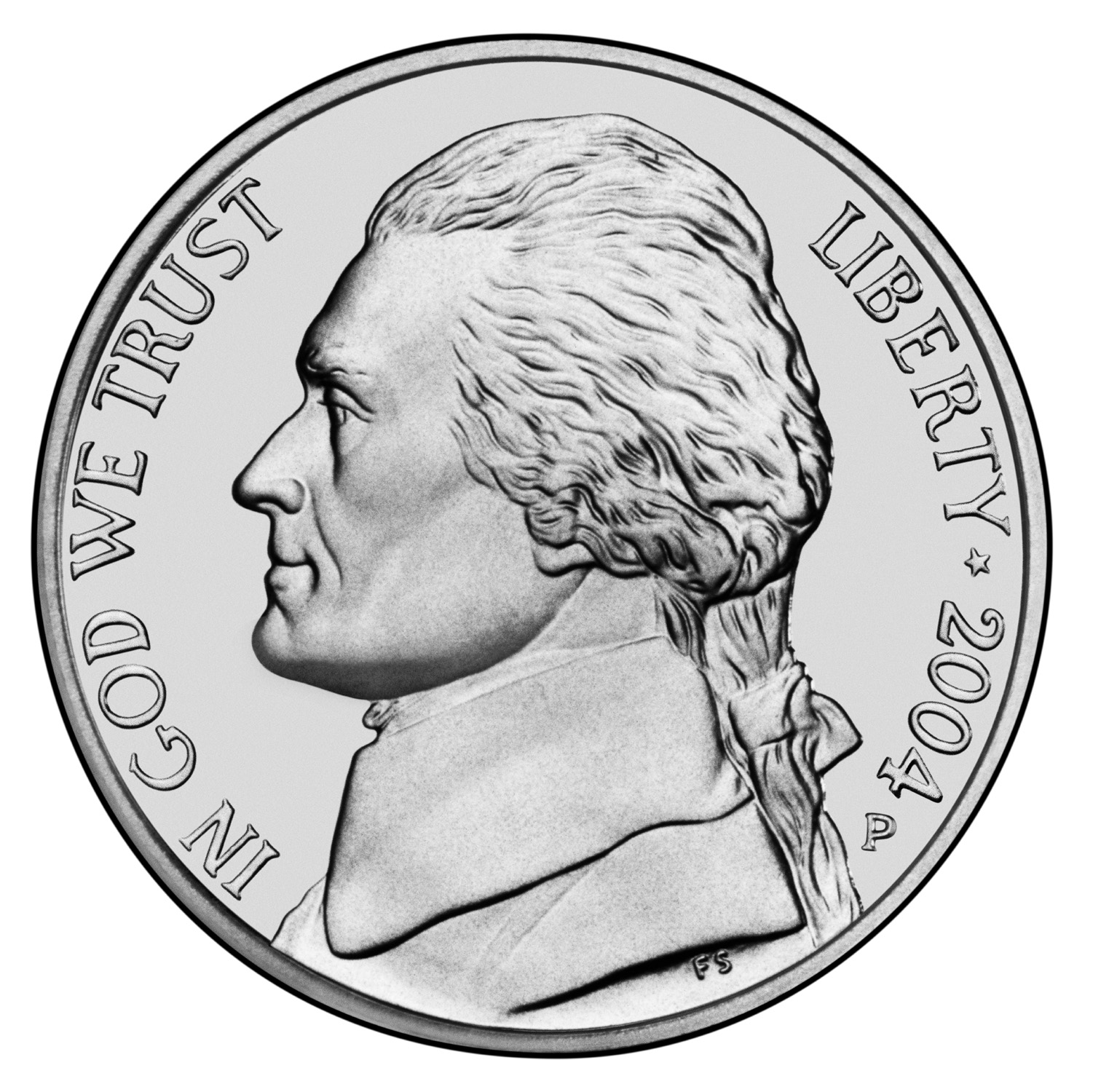
This version of Jefferson has been depicted on the U.S. nickel from 1938 to 2005.

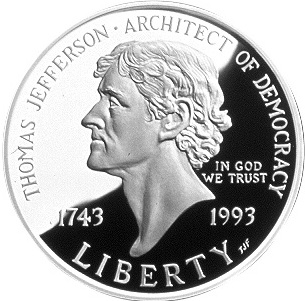
The 1994 Thomas Jefferson 250th Anniversary silver dollar.

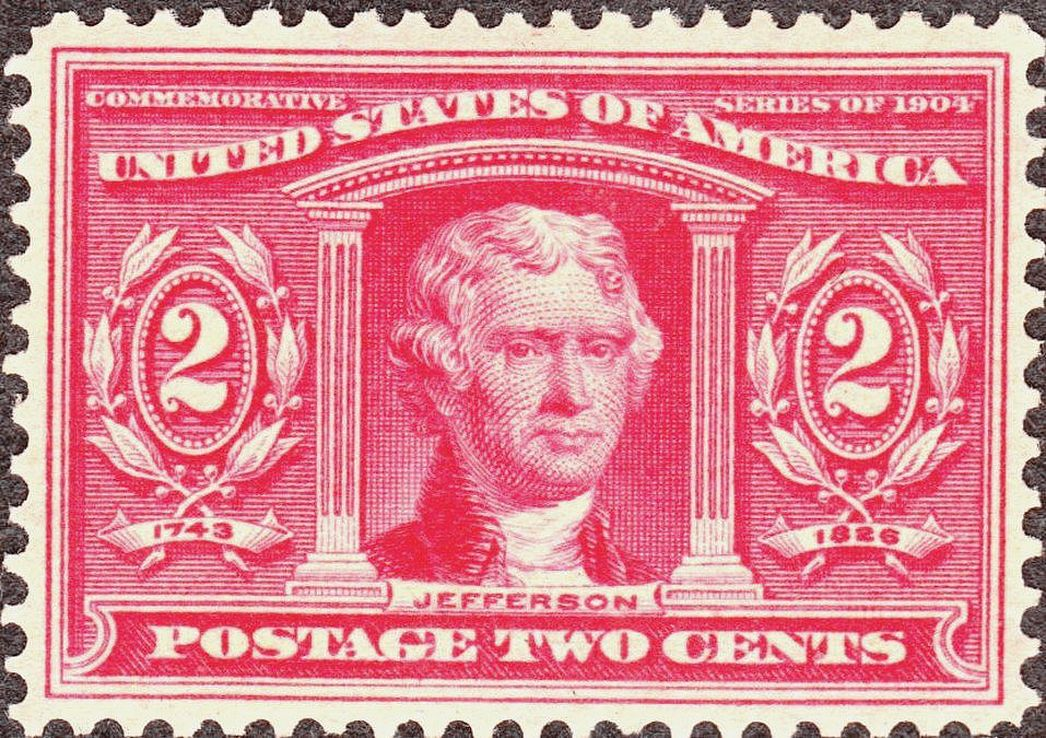
Jefferson on the first presidential Commemorative stamp, 1904 issue. Jefferson has appeared on numerous US postage stamps,

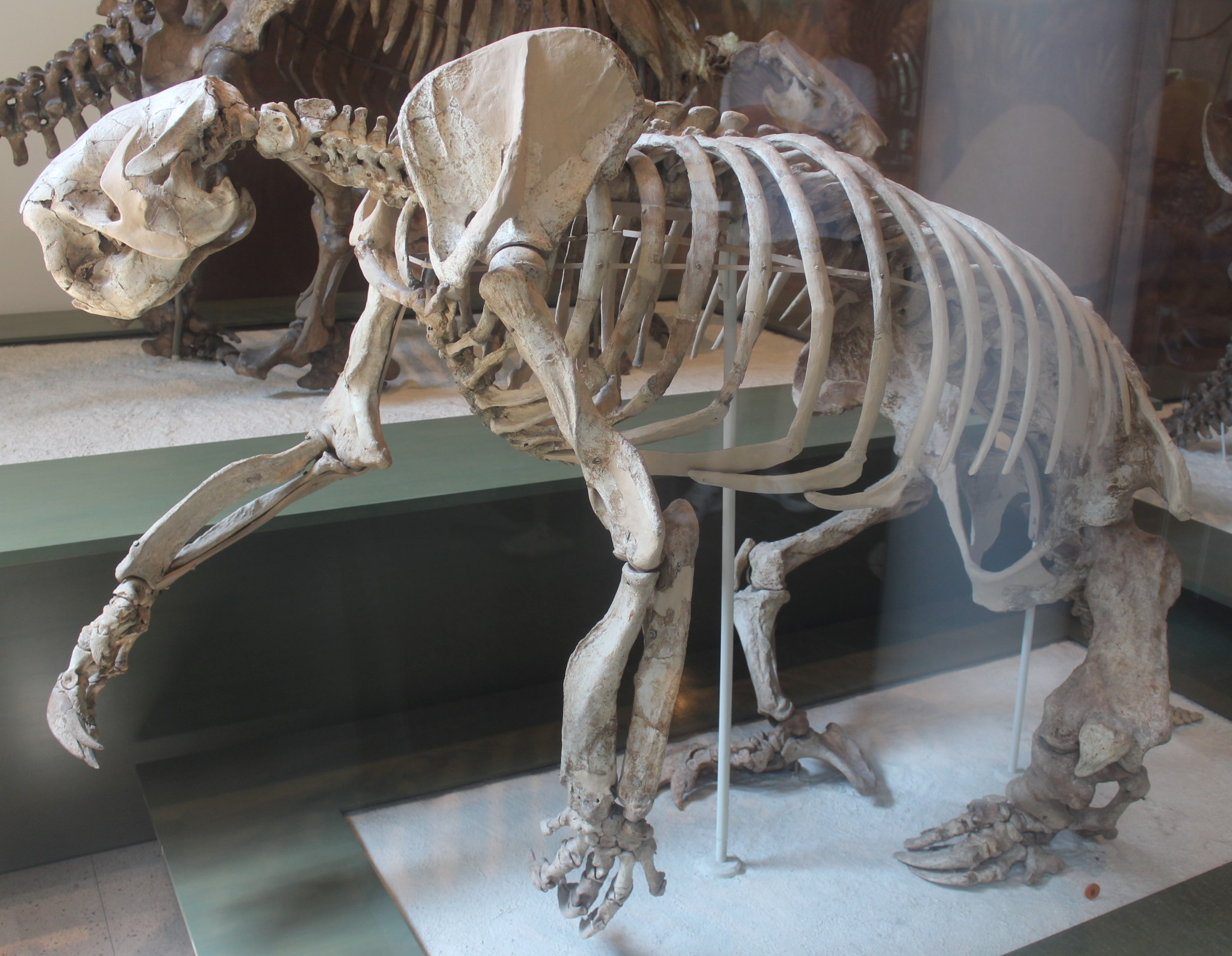
Megalonyx jeffersonii fossil on display at the Natural History Museum of Utah.

== Writings ==
- A Summary View of the Rights of British America (1774)
- Declaration of the Causes and Necessity of Taking Up Arms (1775)
- Declaration of Independence (1776)
- Memorandums taken on a journey from Paris into the southern parts of France and Northern Italy, in the year 1787
- Notes on the State of Virginia (1781)
- Plan for Establishing Uniformity in the Coinage, Weights, and Measures of the United States A report submitted to Congress (1790)
- "An Essay Towards Facilitating Instruction in the Anglo-Saxon and Modern Dialects of the English Language" (1796)
- Manual of Parliamentary Practice for the Use of the Senate of the United States (1801)
- Autobiography (1821)
- Jefferson Bible, or The Life and Morals of Jesus of Nazareth

== See also ==
- Cultural depictions of Thomas Jefferson
- Founders Online
- List of presidents of the United States
- List of presidents of the United States who owned slaves
- Memorial to the 56 Signers of the Declaration of Independence
- Influence of the American Revolution on the French Revolution

== Works cited ==
=== Scholarly studies ===
- Adams, Herbert Baxter (1888). Thomas Jefferson and the University of Virginia. U.S. Government Printing Office.
- Alexander, Leslie (2010). Encyclopedia of African American History (American Ethnic Experience). ABC-CLIO. ISBN 978-1851097692.
- Ambrose, Stephen E. (1996). Undaunted Courage: Meriwether Lewis, Thomas Jefferson, and the Opening of the American West. Simon and Schuster. ISBN 978-0684811079.
- Andresen, Julie (2006). Linguistics in America 1769–1924: A Critical History. Routledge. ISBN 978-1134976119.
- Andrews, Stuart. "Thomas Jefferson and the French Revolution" History Today (May 1968), Vol. 18 Issue 5, pp. 299–306.
- Appleby, Joyce Oldham (2003). Thomas Jefferson: The American Presidents Series: The 3rd President, 1801–1809. Henry Holt and Company. ISBN 978-0805069242.
- Bailey, Jeremy D. (2007). Thomas Jefferson and Executive Power. Twenty-First Century Books. ISBN 978-1139466295.
- Banner, James M. Jr. (1974). C. Vann Woodward (ed.). Responses of the Presidents to Charges of Misconduct. Delacorte Press Dell Publishing Co., Inc. ISBN 978-0440059233.
- Banning, Lance. The Jeffersonian persuasion: evolution of a party ideology (1978) online
- Bassani, Luigi Marco (2010). Liberty, State & Union: The Political Theory of Thomas Jefferson. Mercer University Press. ISBN 978-0881461862.
- Bear, James Adam (1967). Jefferson at Monticello. University of Virginia Press. ISBN 978-0813900223.
- —— (1974). "The Last Few Days in the Life of Thomas Jefferson". Magazine of Albemarle County History. 32: 77.
- Bernstein, Richard B. (2003). Thomas Jefferson. Oxford University Press. ISBN 978-0195181302.
- —— (2004). The Revolution of Ideas. Oxford University Press. ISBN 978-0195143683.
- Berry, Trey; Beasley, Pam; Clements, Jeanne (2006). The Forgotten Expedition, 1804–1805: The Louisiana Purchase Journals of Dunbar and Hunter. LSU Press. ISBN 978-0807131657.
- Bober, Natalie (2008). Thomas Jefferson: Draftsman of a Nation. University of Virginia Press. ISBN 978-0813927329.
- Boles, John B. (2017). Jefferson: Architect of American Liberty. Basic Books. p. 626. ISBN 978-0465094691.
- Brodie, Fawn (1974). Thomas Jefferson: An Intimate History. W. W. Norton & Company. ISBN 978-0393317527.
- Bowers, Claude (1945). The Young Jefferson 1743–1789. Houghton Mifflin Company.
- Burstein, Andrew (2006). Jefferson's Secrets: Death and Desire at Monticello. Basic Books. ISBN 978-0465008131.
- ——; Isenberg, Nancy (2010). Madison and Jefferson. Random House. ISBN 978-1400067282.
- Chernow, Ron (2004). Alexander Hamilton. Penguin Press. ISBN 978-1594200090.
- Jefferson, Thomas (1926). Chinard, Gilbert (ed.). The Commonplace Book of Thomas Jefferson: A Repertory of His Ideas on Government, with an Introduction and Notes by Gilbert Chinard, Volume 2. Baltimore, Maryland: Johns Hopkins Press.
- Jefferson, Thomas (1989). Wilson, D. L. (ed.). Jefferson's Literary Commonplace Book. Princeton: Princeton University Press. ISBN 978-0-691-60750-4.
- Cogliano, Francis D (2008). Thomas Jefferson: Reputation and Legacy. Edinburgh University Press. ISBN 978-0748624997.
- Cooke, Jacob E. (1970). "The Compromise of 1790". William and Mary Quarterly. 27 (4): 523–545. doi:10.2307/1919703. JSTOR 1919703.
- Cunningham, Vinson (December 28, 2020). "What Thomas Jefferson Could Never Understand About Jesus". newyorker.com.
- Crawford, Alan Pell (2008). Twilight at Monticello: The Final Years of Thomas Jefferson. Random House Digital. ISBN 978-1400060795.
- Davis, David Brion (1999). The Problem of Slavery in the Age of Revolution, 1770–1823. Oxford University Press. ISBN 978-0199880836.
- Du Bois, William Edward Burghardt (1904). The suppression of the African slave-trade to the United States of America. Longmans, Green and Co.
- Du Bois, William Edward Burghardt (2007). Henry Louis Gates, Jr. (ed.). The suppression of the African slave trade to the United States of America, 1638-1870. The Oxford W.E.B. Du Bois. New York: Oxford University Press. ISBN 978-0-19-995794-1.
- Earle, Edward Mead (1927). "American Interest in the Greek Cause, 1821–1827". The American Historical Review. 33 (1): 44–63. doi:10.2307/1838110. ISSN 0002-8762. JSTOR 1838110.
- Elkins, Stanley M.; McKitrick, Eric L. (1993). The Age of Federalism. Oxford University Press. ISBN 978-0195068900.
- Ellis, Joseph J. (1996). American Sphinx: The Character of Thomas Jefferson. Alfred A. Knopf. ISBN 978-0679444909. online free
- —— (2000). Thomas Jefferson: Genius of Liberty. Viking Studio. ISBN 978-0670889334.
- —— (2003). Founding Brothers: The Revolutionary Generation. Knopf Doubleday Publishing Group. ISBN 978-1400077687.
- —— (2008). American Creation: Triumphs and Tragedies in the Founding of the Republic. Random House LLC. ISBN 978-0307263698.
- Ferling, John (2000). Setting the World Ablaze: Washington, Adams, Jefferson, and the American Revolution. Oxford University Press. ISBN 978-0195134094.
- —— (2004). Adams vs. Jefferson: The Tumultuous Election of 1800. Oxford University Press. ISBN 978-0195167719.
- Finkelman, Paul (1989). "Evading the Ordinance: The Persistence of Bondage in Indiana and Illinois". Journal of the Early Republic. 9 (1): 21–51. doi:10.2307/3123523. JSTOR 3123523. SSRN 1432011.
- Finkelman, Paul, ed. (2006). The Encyclopedia of American Civil Liberties A-F Index. Vol. 1. Taylor & Francis Group. ISBN 978-1135947040.
- Finkelman, Paul (April 1994). "Thomas Jefferson and Antislavery: The Myth Goes On" (PDF). The Virginia Magazine of History and Biography. Vol. 102, no. 2. Virginia Historical Society. pp. 193–228.
- Foster, Eugene A.; et al. (November 5, 1998). "Jefferson fathered slave's last child". Nature. 396 (6706): 27–28. Bibcode:1998Natur.396...27F. doi:10.1038/23835. PMID 9817200. S2CID 4424562.
- Frawley, William J., ed. (2003). "International Encyclopedia of Linguistics: 4-Volume Set". International Encyclopedia of Linguistics. Oxford University Press. ISBN 978-0195139778.
- Freehling, William W. (2005). Levinson, Sanford; Sparrow, Bartholomew H. (eds.). The Louisiana Purchase and American Expansion, 1803–1898 The Louisiana Purchase and the Coming of the Civil War. Rowman & Littlefield Publishers, Inc. pp. 69–82. ISBN 978-0742549838.
- Freeman, Joanne B. (2008). Shuffelton, Frank (ed.). The Cambridge Companion to Thomas Jefferson. Cambridge University Press. ISBN 978-0521867313.
- Gish, Dustin, and Daniel Klinghard. Thomas Jefferson and the Science of Republican Government: A Political Biography of Notes on the State of Virginia (Cambridge University Press, 2017) excerpt.
- Fremont-Barnes, Gregory (2006). The Wars of the Barbary Pirates: To the Shores of Tripoli – The Rise of the US Navy and Marines. Osprey Publishing. ISBN 978-1846030307.
- Golden, James L.; Golden, Alan L. (2002). Thomas Jefferson and the Rhetoric of Virtue. Rowman & Littlefield. ISBN 978-0742520806.
- Gordon-Reed, Annette (1997). Thomas Jefferson and Sally Hemings: An American Controversy. University Press of Virginia. ISBN 978-0813916989.
- —— (2008). The Hemingses of Monticello: An American Family. W. W. Norton & Company. ISBN 978-0393064773.
- Gordon-Reed, Annette (February 20, 2020). "Thomas Jefferson's Vision of Equality Was Not All-Inclusive. But It Was Transformative".
- Greider, William (2010). Who Will Tell the People. Simon & Schuster. ISBN 978-1439128749.
- Halliday, E. M. (2009). Understanding Thomas Jefferson. Harper Collins. ISBN 978-0060197933.
- Hamelman, Steven (January 1, 2002). "Autobiography and Archive: Franklin, Jefferson, and the Revised Self". Midwest Quarterly.
- Harrison, John Houston (1975) [1935]. Settlers by the Long Grey Trail: Some Pioneers to Old Augusta County, Virginia, and Their Descendants of the Family of Harrison and Allied Lines. Genealogical Publishing Com. ISBN 978-0-8063-0664-3.
- Hart, Charles Henry (1899). Browere's Life Masks of Great Americans. De Vinne Press for Doubleday and McClure Company.
- Hayes, Kevin J. (2008). The Road to Monticello: The Life and Mind of Thomas Jefferson. Oxford University Press. ISBN 978-0195307580.
- Hellenbrand, Harold (1990). The Unfinished Revolution: Education and Politics in the Thought of Thomas Jefferson. Associated University Presse. ISBN 978-0874133707.
- Helo, Ari (2013). Thomas Jefferson's Ethics and the Politics of Human Progress: The Morality of a Slaveholder. Cambridge University Press. ISBN 978-1107435551.
- Hendricks, Nancy (2015). America's First Ladies. ABC-CLIO, LLC. ISBN 978-1610698832.
- Herring, George C. (2008). From Colony to Superpower: U.S. Foreign Relations since 1776. Oxford University Press. ISBN 978-0199743773.
- Hogan, Pendleton (1987). The Lawn: A Guide to Jefferson's University. University Press of Virginia. ISBN 978-0813911090.
- Howe, Daniel Walker (2009). Making the American Self: Jonathan Edwards to Abraham Lincoln. Oxford University Press. ISBN 978-0199740796.
- Hyland, William G (2009). In Defense of Thomas Jefferson: The Sally Hemings Sex Scandal. Carolina Academic Press. ISBN 978-0890890851.
- Jacavone, Jared (2017). The Paid Vote: America's Neutrality During the Greek War for Independence (MA thesis). University of Rhode Island. doi:10.23860/thesis-jacavone-jared-2017.
- Kaplan, Lawrence S. (1999). Thomas Jefferson: Westward the Course of Empire. Rowman & Littlefield. ISBN 978-0842026307.
- Kaufman, Will; Macpherson, Heidi Slettedahl (2005). Britain and the Americas: Culture, Politics, and History. ABC-CLIO. ISBN 978-1851094318.
- Keyssar, Alexander (2009). The Right to Vote: The Contested History of Democracy in the United States. Basic Books. ISBN 978-0465010141.
- Maier, Pauline (1997). American Scripture: Making the Declaration of Independence. Knopf. ISBN 978-0679454922.
- Malone, Dumas, ed. (1933). "Jefferson, Thomas". Dictionary of American Biography. Vol. 10. Charles Scribner's Sons. pp. 17–35.
- Malone, Dumas. Jefferson (6 vol. 1948–1981)
  - —— (1948). Jefferson, The Virginian. Jefferson and His Time. Vol. 1. Little Brown. OCLC 1823927., Ebook
  - —— (1951). Jefferson and the Rights of Man. Jefferson and His Time. Vol. 2. Little Brown.
  - —— (1962). Jefferson and the Ordeal of Liberty. Jefferson and His Time. Vol. 3. Little, Brown. ISBN 978-0316544757.
  - —— (1970). Jefferson the President: First Term, 1801–1805. Jefferson and His Time. Vol. 4. Little Brown.
  - —— (1974). Jefferson the President: Second Term, 1805–1809. Jefferson and His Time. Vol. 5. Little Brown. OCLC 1929523.
  - —— (1981). The Sage of Monticello. Jefferson and His Time. Vol. 6. Little Brown. ISBN 978-0316544788.
- Mapp, Alf J. (1991). Jefferson: Passionate Pilgrim. Rowman & Littlefield. ISBN 978-0517098882.
- Mayer, David N. (1994). The Constitutional Thought of Thomas Jefferson (Constitutionalism and Democracy). University of Virginia Press. ISBN 978-0813914855.
- McCullough, David (2001). John Adams. Simon & Schuster. ISBN 978-1471104527.
- McDonald, Robert M. S. (2004). Thomas Jefferson's Military Academy: Founding West Point. Jeffersonian America. University of Virginia Press. ISBN 978-0813922980.
- McEwan, Barbara (1991). Thomas Jefferson, Farmer. McFarland. ISBN 978-0899506333.
- Meacham, Jon (2012). Thomas Jefferson: The Art of Power. Random House LLC. ISBN 978-0679645368.
- —— (2013). Thomas Jefferson: The Art of Power (Paperback). Random House Trade Paperbacks. ISBN 978-0812979480.
- Miller, John Chester (1980). The Wolf by the Ears: Thomas Jefferson and Slavery. University of Virginia Press. ISBN 978-0452005303.
- Miller, Robert J. (2008). Native America, Discovered and Conquered: Thomas Jefferson, Lewis & Clark, and Manifest Destiny. University of Nebraska Press. ISBN 978-0803215986.
- Mott, Frank Luther. (1943) Jefferson and the press (LSU Press) online
- Onuf, Peters S. (2000). Jefferson's Empire: The Language of American Nationhood. U of Virginia Press. ISBN 978-0813922041.
- —— (2007). The Mind of Thomas Jefferson. University of Virginia Press. ISBN 978-0813926117.
- Peterson, Merrill D. (1960). The Jefferson Image in the American Mind. University of Virginia Press. 1998 Revised reprint. ISBN 978-0-8139-1851-8
- —— (1970). Thomas Jefferson and the New Nation; a Biography. Oxford University Press. ISBN 978-0195000542.
- —— (2002). "Thomas Jefferson". In Graff, Henry (ed.). The Presidents: A Reference History (7th ed.). Charles Scribner's Sons. pp. 39–56.
- Phillips, Julieanne (1997). "Northwest Ordinance (1787)". In Rodriguez, Junius (ed.). The Historical Encyclopedia of World Slavery. ABC-CLIO. pp. 473–474. ISBN 978-0874368857.
- Randall, Willard Sterne (1994). Thomas Jefferson: A Life. Harper Collins. ISBN 978-0060976170., popular history; weak after 1790.
- Randall, Willard Sterne (1996). "Thomas Jefferson Takes A Vacation". American Heritage. Vol. 47, no. 4.
- Rodriguez, Junius (2002). The Louisiana Purchase: a historical and geographical encyclopedia. ABC-CLIO. ISBN 978-1576071885.
- Stewart, John J. (1997). Thomas Jefferson: Forerunner to the Restoration. Cedar Fort. ISBN 978-0882906058.
- Sheehan, Bernard (1974). Seeds of Extinction: Jeffersonian Philanthropy and the American Indian. W. W. Norton & Company. ISBN 978-0393007169.
- Scythes, James (2014). Tucker, Spencer C. (ed.). The Encyclopedia of the Wars of the Early American Republic, 1783–1812 A Political, Social, and Military History. ABC-CLIO. ISBN 978-1598841565.
- Shuffelton, Frank (1974). "Introduction". In Jefferson, Thomas. (ed.). Notes on the State of Virginia. Penguin. ISBN 978-0140436679.
- Smith, Robert C. (2003). Encyclopedia of African American Politics. Infobase Publishing. p. 433. ISBN 978-1438130194.
- Spahn, Hannah (2024). Black Reason, White Feeling. The Jeffersonian Enlightenment in the African American Tradition. University of Virginia Press. p. 328. ISBN 978-0813951201.
- Tucker, George (1837). The Life of Thomas Jefferson, Third President of the United States; 2 vol. Carey, Lea & Blanchard.
- —— (1990). Empire of Liberty: The Statecraft of Thomas Jefferson. Cogliano Press. ISBN 978-0198022763.
- Urofsky, Melvin I., ed. (2006). Biographical Encyclopedia of the Supreme Court: The Lives and Legal Philosophies of the Justices. CQ Press. ISBN 978-1452267289.
- Wiencek, Henry (2012). Master of the Mountain: Thomas Jefferson and his slaves. Macmillan.
- Wilentz, Sean (2005). The Rise of American Democracy. W. W. Norton & Company. pp. 108–111. ISBN 978-0393058208.
- Wilson, Steven Harmon (2012). The U.S. Justice System: Law and constitution in early America. ABC-CLIO. ISBN 978-1598843040.
- Wood, Gordon S (2006). Revolutionary Characters: What Made the Founders Different. Penguin Press. ISBN 978-1594200939.
- —— (2010). Empire of Liberty: A History of the Early Republic, 1789–1815. Oxford University Press. ISBN 978-0195039146.
- —— (2011). The Idea of America: Reflections on the Birth of the United States. Penguin Press. ISBN 978-1594202902.

=== Thomas Jefferson Foundation sources ===
- "American Philosophical Society". Thomas Jefferson Foundation.
- "Coded Messages". Thomas Jefferson Foundation.
- "Embargo of 1807". Thomas Jefferson Foundation.
- "I Rise with the Sun". Thomas Jefferson Foundation.
- "Italy – Language". Thomas Jefferson Foundation.
- "James Madison". Thomas Jefferson Foundation.
- "Jefferson's Antislavery Actions". Thomas Jefferson Foundation.
- "Jefferson's Religious Beliefs". Thomas Jefferson Foundation.
- "Maria Cosway (Engraving)". Thomas Jefferson Foundation.
- "Minority Report of the Monticello Research Committee on Thomas Jefferson and Sally Hemings". Thomas Jefferson Foundation.
- "Monticello construction chronology". Thomas Jefferson Foundation.
- "Monticello (House) FAQ – Who built the house?". Thomas Jefferson Foundation.
- "Nailery". Thomas Jefferson Foundation.
- "President Jefferson and the Indian Nations". Thomas Jefferson Foundation.
- "Public Speaking". Thomas Jefferson Foundation.
- "Quotations on Slavery and Emancipation". Thomas Jefferson Foundation. Archived from the original on August 20, 2016.
- "Report of the Research Committee on Thomas Jefferson and Sally Hemings – Conclusions". Thomas Jefferson Foundation.
- "Sale of Monticello". Thomas Jefferson Foundation.
- "Slave Dwellings". Thomas Jefferson Foundation. Archived from the original on March 4, 2016.
- "Slavery at Monticello FAQ – Property". Thomas Jefferson Foundation.
- "Slavery at Monticello FAQ – Work". Thomas Jefferson Foundation.
- "Spanish Language". Thomas Jefferson Foundation.
- "Thomas Jefferson: A Brief Biography". Thomas Jefferson Foundation.
- "Thomas Jefferson and Sally Hemings: A Brief Account". Thomas Jefferson Foundation.
- "Thomas Jefferson and Slavery". Thomas Jefferson Foundation.
- "Thomas Jefferson's Enlightenment and American Indians". Thomas Jefferson Foundation.
- "Thomas Jefferson's Religious Beliefs". Thomas Jefferson Foundation.

=== Primary sources ===
- The Papers of Thomas Jefferson, – the Princeton University Press edition of the correspondence and papers; vol 1 appeared in 1950; vol 41 (covering part of 1803) appeared in 2014.
  - "Founders Online," searchable edition
- Jefferson, Thomas (November 10, 1798). "Thomas Jefferson, Resolutions Relative to the Alien and Sedition Acts". The Founder's Constitution. University of Chicago Press.
- Thomas, Jefferson (1914). Autobiography of Thomas Jefferson 1743–1790. G.P. Putnam's Sons.
- "Thomas Jefferson". University of Virginia Library.
- Jefferson, Thomas (1900). The Life and Writings of Thomas Jefferson. pp. 265–266.
- —— (1853). Notes on the State of Virginia. J.W. Randolph. (Note: This was Jefferson's only book; numerous editions)
- —— (1977). The Portable Thomas Jefferson. Penguin Press. ISBN 978-1101127667.
- Yarbrough, Jean M.; Jefferson, Thomas (2006). The Essential Jefferson. Hackett Publishing. ISBN 978-1603843782.

=== Web site sources ===
- "Gathering Voices: Thomas Jefferson and Native America". American Philosophical Society. Archived from the original on August 13, 2016.
- "Thomas Jefferson to Horatio G. Spafford, 17 March 1814". U.S. Government: National Archives.
- "American President: A Reference Resource". University of Virginia: Miller Center. Archived from the original on August 26, 2014.
- Barger, Herbert (October 15, 2008). "The Jefferson-Hemings DNA Study". Jefferson DNA Study Group.
- "Carving History". Mount Rushmore National Memorial. National Park Service.
- De Witte, Melissa (July 1, 2020). "When Thomas Jefferson penned 'all men are created equal,' he did not mean individual equality, says Stanford scholar". StandfordReport.
- Finkelman, Paul (November 30, 2012). "The Monster of Monticello". The New York Times.
- Haimann, Alexander T. (May 16, 2006). "5-cent Jefferson". Arago, Smithsonian Institution.
- "Jefferson's library". Library of Congress. April 24, 2000.
- "Jefferson Nickel". U.S. Mint.
- "Jefferson's Vision of the Academical Village". University of Virginia. October 14, 2010. Archived from the original on December 25, 2015.
- "Martha Wayles Skelton Jefferson". whitehouse.gov – via National Archives.
- Roberts, Gary Boyd (April–May 1993). "The Royal Descents of Jane Pierce, Alice and Edith Roosevelt, Helen Taft, Eleanor Roosevelt, and Barbara Bush". American Ancestors. New England Historic Genealogical Society.
- Rottinghaus, Brandon; Vaughn, Justin S. (February 13, 2015). "Measuring Obama against the great presidents". Brookings Institution.
- "The Jefferson Hemings Controversy – Report of The Scholars Commission: Summary" (PDF). Thomas Jefferson Heritage Society. 2011 [2001]. pp. 8–9, 11, 15–17. Archived from the original (PDF) on September 18, 2016.
- "Siena Poll: American Presidents". Siena Research Institute. July 6, 2010. Archived from the original on July 6, 2010.
- "Thomas Jefferson: Biography". National Park Service.
- "The Thomas Jefferson Papers Timeline: 1743–1827". Library of Congress.
- "Thomas Jefferson Presidential $1 Coin". U.S. Mint. Archived from the original on August 11, 2016.
- "U.S. Currency: $2 Note". U.S. Bureau of Engraving and Printing.
- "The Life and Morals of Jesus of Nazareth". 1820.
- "Bookquick/"The Autobiography of Thomas Jefferson, 1743–1790" | Penn Current". Archived from the original on December 8, 2015.
- Konig, David T. "Jefferson Thomas and the Practice of_Law, Three cases".
- "The Burr Conspiracy". PBS American Experience. 2000.
- Wilson, Douglas L. (1992). "Thomas Jefferson and the Issue of Character". The Atlantic.
- "Thomas Jefferson's descendants unite over a troubled past". CBS News. February 14, 2019.
- "Thomas Jefferson and Sally Hemings A Brief Account". monticello.org.
- Peter, Carlson (September 27, 2017). "The Bible According to Thomas Jefferson". historynet.com.

Political offices
Preceded by Patrick Henry	Governor of Virginia; 1779–1781	Succeeded by William Fleming
Preceded by John Jay; Acting	United States Secretary of State; 1790–1793	Succeeded by Edmund Randolph
Preceded by John Adams	Vice President of the United States; 1797–1801	Succeeded by Aaron Burr
Preceded by John Adams	President of the United States; 1801–1809	Succeeded by James Madison
Diplomatic posts
Preceded by Benjamin Franklin	United States Minister to France; 1785–1789	Succeeded by William Short
Party political offices
New political party	Democratic-Republican nominee for President of the United States; 1796, (Note: Prior to the passage of the Twelfth Amendment in 1804, each presidential elector would cast two ballots; the highest vote-getter would become president and the runner-up would become vice president. Thus, in 1796, the Democratic-Republican Party fielded Jefferson as a presidential candidate, but he came in second and therefore became vice president.) 1800, 1804	Succeeded by James Madison
