= Early life and career of Thomas Jefferson =

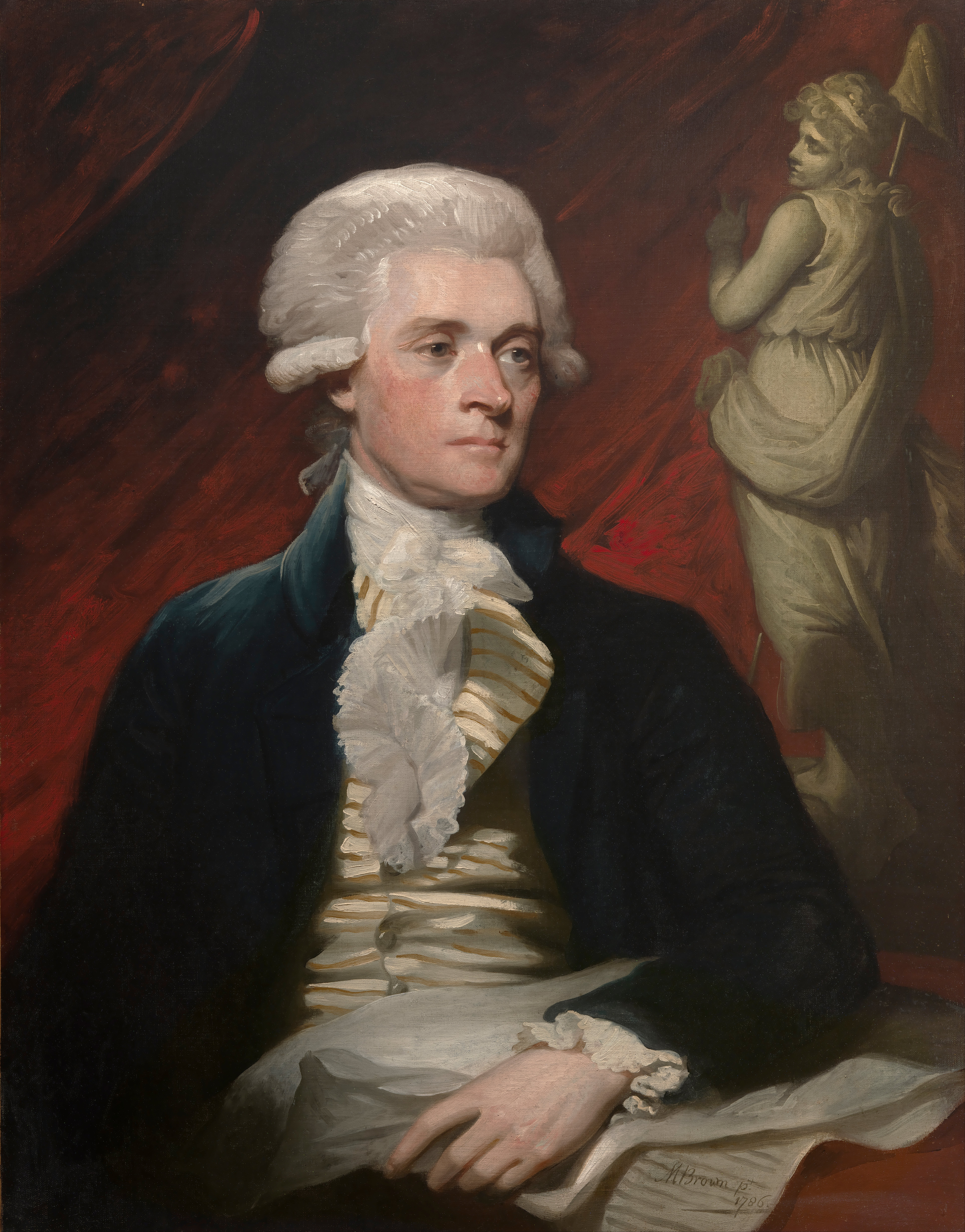
Portrait by Mather Brown, c. 1786

Thomas Jefferson, the third president of the United States, was involved in politics from his early adult years. This article covers his early life and career, through his writing the Declaration of Independence, participation in the American Revolutionary War, serving as governor of Virginia, and election and service as Vice President to President John Adams.

Born into the planter class of Virginia, Jefferson was highly educated and valued his years at the College of William and Mary. He became an attorney and planter, building on the estate and 20–40 slaves inherited from his father.

== Jeffersons of Virginia ==
His father was Peter Jefferson, a planter, slaveholder, and surveyor in Albemarle County (Shadwell, Virginia). When Colonel William Randolph, an old friend of Peter Jefferson, died in 1745, Peter assumed executorship and personal charge of Randolph's estate in Tuckahoe as well as his infant son, Thomas Mann Randolph. That year the Jeffersons relocated to Tuckahoe, where they lived for the next seven years before returning to their home in Albemarle in 1752. Peter Jefferson was appointed to the colonelcy of the county, an important position at the time. After he died in 1757, his son Thomas Jefferson inherited his estate, including about 20-40 slaves. They comprised the core of his labor force when he started to build Monticello as a young man.

Jefferson's paternal grandfather and great-grandfather were also named Thomas. His grandfather, Thomas Jefferson (1677–1731) resided at a settlement called Osbornes in what is now Chesterfield County, Virginia. Jefferson's great-grandfather was a planter of Henrico County and his wife was Mary Branch. (Note: His wife, Mary Branch, married Joseph Mattocks, having obtained a marriage license on November 17, 1700.) Mary was the granddaughter of Christopher Branch, a member of the House of Burgesses. Thomas was a tobacco farmer who owned a couple slaves, surveyor, and "gentleman justice". He purchased land along James River in 1682 and lived in the Flowerdieu, also Flowerdew Hundred of Henrico County. (Note: A John Jefferson or Mr. Jefferson was a delegate representing the Flowerdieu hundred in the first legislative assembly of Colonial America in 1619. The attendee of the 1619 legislative assembly is believed to be an ancestor of President Thomas Jefferson, according to Virginia Biographer Lyon Gardiner Tyler (1898). Thomas Jefferson believed, but was unable to prove, that John Jefferson was his great great grandfather. John arrived in Virginia in 1619, having arrived on the Bonahora or the Bona Nova. He was made a burgess that year and represented the Flowerdieu Hundred at Farolay's Council in Jamestown. He obtained a land patent at Archer's Hope in 1626. He abandoned the property and moved to the West Indies and was back in England by 1645.) Jefferson's great-grandfather died in 1697.

There is conflicting information about Jefferson's heritage (Note: According to historian Jon Meacham, Jefferson's first American ancestor immigrated to Virginia from England in 1612. Monticello states that a Jefferson ancestor(s) immigrated about the 1660s or 1670s. Family tradition was that his first American ancestor arrived in Virginia from Wales, near Snowdon mountain. (Peter Jefferson named some of his land along the James River 'Snowden' for this family story.) No records have been found, though, that state that there were Jeffersons in the Snowdonia region in the 16th and early 17th centuries. Other relatives were also early settlers of Virginia. Taylor (1965) argues that the ancestors of the Jeffersons may have been associated with the time of the Norman Conquest (1066), for "Jefferson" is derived from the Norman "Geoffrey." (It stands for Jeffrey's son or other similar father's name.)) and specifically the parents of his great-grandfather. (Note: There are two theories in which Thomas Jefferson may be related to the Jeaffreson family from Suffolk, England. One theory is that Samuel Jeaffreson who became a successful businessman in the Leeward Islands was the father of Jefferson's great grandfather. Samuel, who was born at Pettistree, Suffolk in 1607 and he settled St. Kitts and Antigua, had a son named Thomas. Samuel is thought to have arrived in St. Kitts in 1624 aboard the Hopewell. Colonel John Jeaffreson, also from the family of Suffolk, was a merchant in London and did business with the Virginia Colony in the early 1620s. He built a fortune on St. Kitts before returning in the 1650s to England, where he purchased the Dullingham House estate in Cambridgeshire. There is some information he may have been the father of a Thomas Jefferson who lived in Nevis and Jamaica in the mid 1600s and may have then removed to Henrico County, Virginia. Although there is scant information to support this theory, the Virginia Jeffersons derived their coat of arms from the Jeaffresons of Dullingham House.) There are also unproven allegations that were made about Jefferson's heritage during an 18th-century Presidential campaign. (Note: In an 18th-century Presidential campaign, someone speaking against Jefferson's candidacy and in favor of that of John Adams accused Jefferson of being "half Injun, half nigger, half Frenchman" and born to a "mulatto father" or slave and "a half-breed Indian squaw", this birth to a mulatto and an Indian allegedly "well-known in the neighbourhood where he was raised" but otherwise unproven.)

Within a few generations, the Jeffersons rose from that of middling planters who struggled against low tobaccos prices beginning in the 1680s to that of the country elite and to the very pinnacle of society. The plantation-based economy of the Jeffersons and their peers relied on acquisition of slaves from West Africa and West Central Africa, primarily from the Bight of Biafra and Angola. In 1784, Jefferson published Notes on the State of Virginia where he stated that enslaved individuals made up to a third to a half of the inhabitants of most Piedmont counties of Virginia.

Thomas Jefferson was born on April 13, 1743 (April 2, 1743 O.S.) (Note: The birth and death of Thomas Jefferson are given using the Gregorian calendar. As he was born when Britain and her colonies still used the Julian calendar, contemporary records and his tombstone record his birth as April 2, 1743.) at the family home in Shadwell, Goochland County, Virginia, now part of Albemarle County. His mother was Jane Randolph, daughter of Isham Randolph, a ship's captain and sometime planter, and his wife. Peter and Jane married in 1739. Thomas Jefferson had appeared to have little interest in and indifference to his ancestry; he stated that he only knew that his paternal grandfather lived.

Before the widower William Randolph died in 1745, he appointed Peter Jefferson, an old friend, as guardian to manage his Tuckahoe Plantation and care for his four children. That year the Jeffersons relocated to Tuckahoe, where they lived for the next seven years before returning to Shadwell in 1752. Here Thomas Jefferson recorded his earliest memory, that of being carried on a pillow by a slave during the move to Tuckahoe. Peter Jefferson died in 1757 and the Jefferson estate was divided between his two sons: Thomas and Randolph. John Harvie Sr. then became Thomas' guardian. Thomas inherited approximately 5,000 acres (2,000 ha; 7.8 sq mi) of land, including Monticello and between 20 and 40 slaves. He took control of the property after he came of age at 21.

On October 1, 1765, when Jefferson was 22, his oldest sister Jane died at the age of 25. He fell into a period of deep mourning, as he was already saddened by the absence of his sisters Mary, who had been married several years to John Bolling III, and Martha, who in July had wed Dabney Carr. Both lived at their husbands' residences. Only Jefferson's younger siblings Elizabeth, Lucy, and the two toddlers, were at home. He drew little comfort from the younger ones, as they did not provide him with the same intellectual engagement as the older sisters had. According to the historian Ferling, while growing up Jefferson struggled with loneliness and abandonment issues that eventually developed into a reclusive lifestyle as an adult.

=== Education ===
Jefferson began his childhood education under the direction of tutors at Tuckahoe along with the Randolph children.

In 1752, Jefferson began attending a local school run by a Scottish Presbyterian minister. It was here at a young age that Jefferson would begin to learn the enlightenment principles through his European teacher by studying Latin, Greek, and French. Jefferson also learned how to ride horses, and began to appreciate the study of nature and gardening. He studied under the Reverend James Maury from 1758 to 1760 near Gordonsville, Virginia. While boarding with Maury's family, he studied history, science and the classics.

At age 16, Jefferson entered the College of William & Mary in Williamsburg, and first met the law professor George Wythe, who became his influential mentor. For two years he studied mathematics, metaphysics, and philosophy under Professor William Small, who introduced the enthusiastic Jefferson to the writings of the British Empiricists, including John Locke, Francis Bacon, and Isaac Newton. He also improved his French, Greek, and violin. A diligent student, Jefferson displayed an avid curiosity in all fields. Jefferson read law while working as a law clerk for Wythe. During this time, he also read a wide variety of English classics and political works. Jefferson was admitted to the Virginia bar five years later in 1767.

Throughout his life, Jefferson depended on books for his education. He collected and accumulated thousands of books for his library at Monticello. When his father Peter died, Jefferson inherited, among other things, his father's large library. A significant portion of Jefferson's library was also bequeathed to him in the will of George Wythe, who had an extensive collection. Always eager for more knowledge, Jefferson continued learning throughout most of his life. Jefferson once said, "I cannot live without books."

=== Marriage and family ===
After practicing as a circuit lawyer for several years, Jefferson married the 23-year-old widow Martha Wayles Skelton. The wedding was celebrated on January 1, 1772, at Martha's home, an estate called 'The Forest' near Williamsburg, Virginia. Martha Jefferson was described as attractive, gracious and popular with their friends; she was a frequent hostess for Jefferson and managed the large household. They were said to have a happy marriage. She read widely, did fine needle work and was an amateur musician. Jefferson played the violin and Martha was an accomplished piano player. It is said that she was attracted to Jefferson largely because of their mutual love of music. One of the wedding gifts he gave to Martha was a "forte-piano". During the ten years of their marriage, she had six children: Martha, called Patsy, (1772–1836); Jane (1774–1775); a stillborn or unnamed son in 1777; Mary Wayles (1778–1804), called Polly; Lucy Elizabeth (1780–1781); and Lucy Elizabeth (1782–1784) (Note: While the news from Francis Eppes, with whom Lucy was staying, did not reach Jefferson until 1785, in an undated letter, it is clear that the year of her death was 1784 from another letter to Jefferson from James Currie dated 20 November 1784.). Two survived to adulthood.

After her father John Wayles died in 1773, Martha and her husband Jefferson inherited his 135 slaves, 11,000 acres and the debts of his estate. These things took Jefferson and other co-executors of the estate years to pay off, which contributed to his financial problems. Among the slaves were Betty Hemings and her 10 children; the six youngest were half-siblings of Martha Wayles Jefferson, as they are believed to have been children of her father, (Note: "John Wayles", Jefferson's Community: Relatives, Monticello. Footnote to Wayles' paternity: Isaac Jefferson, Memoirs, 4; Madison Hemings, "Life Among the Lowly," Pike County Republican, March 13, 1873. A December 20, 1802 letter from Thomas Gibbons, a Federalist planter of Georgia, to Jonathan Dayton states that Sally Hemings "is half sister to his first wife." Similarly, a letter from Thomas Turner in the May 31, 1805 Boston Repertory states, "an opinion has existed . . . that this very Sally is the natural daughter of Mr. Wales, who was the father of the actual Mrs. Jefferson.") and they were three-quarters European in ancestry. The youngest, an infant, was Sally Hemings. As they grew and were trained, all the Hemings family members were assigned to privileged positions among the slaves at Monticello, as domestic servants, chefs, and highly skilled artisans.

Later in life, Martha Jefferson suffered from diabetes and ill health, and frequent childbirth further weakened her. A few months after the birth of her last child, Martha died on September 6, 1782. Jefferson was at his wife's bedside and was distraught after her death. In the following three weeks, Jefferson shut himself in his room, where he paced back and forth until he was nearly exhausted. Later he would often take long rides on secluded roads to mourn for his wife. As he had promised his wife, Jefferson never remarried.

Jefferson's oldest daughter Martha (called Patsy) married Thomas Mann Randolph, Jr. in 1790. They had 12 children, eleven of whom survived to adulthood. She suffered severe problems as Randolph became alcoholic and was abusive. When they separated for several years, Martha and her many children lived at Monticello with her father, adding to his financial burdens. Her oldest son, Thomas Jefferson Randolph, helped her run Monticello for a time after her father's death. She had the longest life of Jefferson's children by Martha.

Mary Jefferson (called Polly and Maria) married her first cousin John Wayles Eppes in 1797. As a wedding settlement, Jefferson gave them Betsy Hemmings, the 14-year-old granddaughter of Betty Hemings, and 30 other slaves. The Eppes had three children together, but only a son survived. Frail like her mother, Maria died at the age of 25, several months after her third child was born. Who also died, and only her son Francis W. Eppes survived to adulthood, cared for by slaves, his father and, after five years, a stepmother.

=== Monticello ===
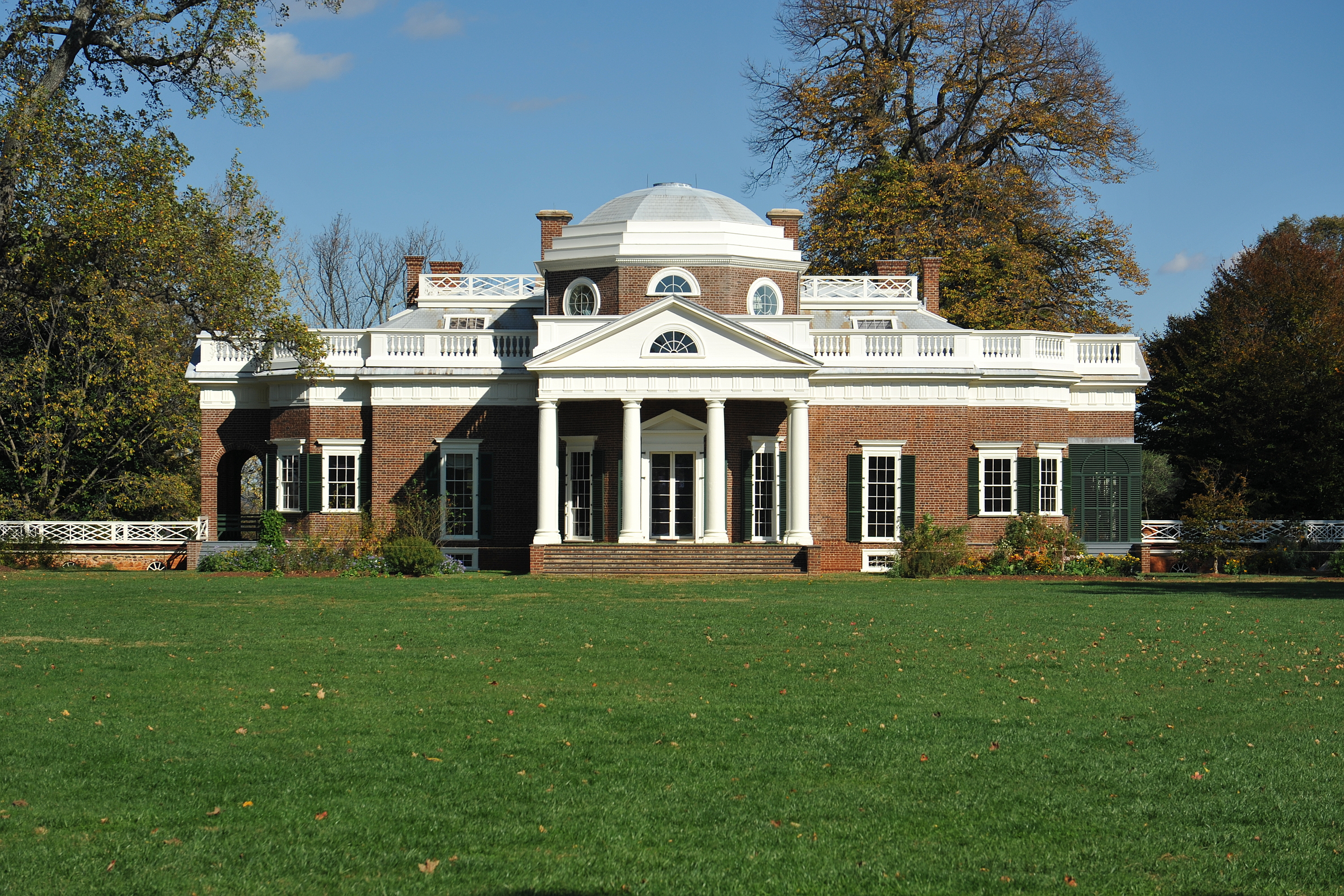
West lawn in October 2010

In 1768, Jefferson started the construction of Monticello located on 5,000 acres of land on and around a hilltop. What would soon become a mansion started as a large one room brick house. Over the years Jefferson designed and built additions to the house where it took on neoclassical dimensions. The house would soon become his architectural masterpiece. The construction was done by Jefferson and his slave laborers, some of whom were master carpenters. Much of the fine furniture in the house was built by his slaves, who were also very skilled designers and craftsmen. Jefferson moved into the South Pavilion (an outbuilding) in 1770, where his new wife Martha joined him in 1772. Monticello would be his continuing project to create a neoclassical environment, based on his study of the architect Andrea Palladio and the classical orders.

While Minister to France during 1784–1789, he had an opportunity to see some of the classical buildings with which he had become acquainted from his reading, as well as to discover the "modern" trends in French architecture then fashionable in Paris. In 1794, following his service as Secretary of State (1790–93), he began rebuilding Monticello based on the ideas he had acquired in Europe. The remodeling continued throughout most of his presidency (1801–09). The most notable change was the addition of the octagonal dome.

=== Lawyer and House of Burgesses ===
Jefferson handled many cases as a lawyer in colonial Virginia, and was very active from 1768 to 1773. Jefferson's client list included members of Virginia's elite families, including members of his mother's family, the Randolphs.

Beside practicing law, Jefferson represented Albemarle County in the Virginia House of Burgesses His friend and mentor George Wythe served at the same time. Following the passage of the Coercive Acts by the British Parliament in 1774, Jefferson wrote a set of resolutions against the acts, which were expanded into A Summary View of the Rights of British America, his first published work. Previous criticism of the Coercive Acts had focused on legal and constitutional issues, but Jefferson offered the radical notion that the colonists had the natural right to govern themselves. Jefferson argued that Parliament was the legislature of Great Britain only, and had no legislative authority in the colonies. The paper was intended to serve as instructions for the Virginia delegation of the First Continental Congress, but Jefferson's ideas proved to be too radical for that body.

== Political career from 1775 to 1800 ==
=== Declaration of Independence ===
In John Trumbull's painting Declaration of Independence, the five-man drafting committee is presenting its work to the Continental Congress.

Thomas Jefferson was the principal author of the Declaration of Independence, a formal document which officially proclaimed the dissolution of the American colonies from the British Crown. The sentiments of revolution put forth in the Declaration were already well established in 1776 as the colonies were already at war with the British when the Declaration was being debated, drafted and signed.

Before the Declaration was drafted, Jefferson served as a delegate from Virginia to the Second Continental Congress beginning in June 1775, soon after the outbreak of the American Revolutionary War. He sought out John Adams who, along with his cousin Samuel, had emerged as a leader of the convention. Jefferson and Adams established a lifelong friendship and would correspond frequently; Adams ensured that Jefferson was appointed to the five-man committee to write a declaration in support of the resolution of independence. Having agreed on an approach, the committee selected Jefferson to write the first draft. His eloquent writing style made him the committee's choice for primary author; the others edited his draft. During June 1776, the month before the signing, Jefferson took notes of the Congressional debates over the proposed Declaration in order to include such sentiments in his draft, among other things justifying the right of citizens to resort to revolution. Jefferson also drew from his proposed draft of the Virginia Constitution, George Mason's draft of the Virginia Declaration of Rights, and other sources.

The historian Joseph Ellis states that the Declaration was the "core of [Jefferson]'s seductive appeal across the ages". After working for two days to modify the document, Congress removed language that was deemed offensive to supporters of the Patriot cause in Britain along with Jefferson's clause that denounced King George III for supposedly imposing the slave trade on the American colonies. This was the longest clause removed. Congress trimmed the draft by about one fourth, wanting the Declaration to appeal to both the British and American public, while at the same time not wanting to give representatives from South Carolina and Georgia reasons to oppose the Declaration on abolitionist grounds. Jefferson deeply resented some of the many omissions Congress made. On July 4, 1776, Congress ratified the Declaration of Independence and distributed the document. Historians have considered it to be one of Jefferson's major achievements; the preamble is considered an enduring statement of human rights that has inspired people around the world. Its second sentence is the following:

We hold these truths to be self-evident, that all men are created equal, that they are endowed by their Creator with certain unalienable Rights, that among these are Life, Liberty and the pursuit of Happiness.

This has been called "one of the best-known sentences in the English language", containing "the most potent and consequential words in American history". The passage came to represent a moral standard to which the United States should strive. This view was notably promoted by Abraham Lincoln, who based his philosophy on it, and argued for the Declaration as a statement of principles through which the United States Constitution should be interpreted. Intended also as a revolutionary document for the world, not just the colonies, the Declaration of Independence was Jefferson's assertion of his core beliefs in a republican form of government. The Declaration became the core document and a tradition in American political values. It also became the model of democracy that was adopted by many peoples around the world. Abraham Lincoln once referred to Jefferson's principles as "..the definitions and axioms of a free society..".

=== Virginia state legislator and Governor ===
After Independence, Jefferson desired to reform the Virginia government. In September 1776, eager to work on creating the new government and dismantle the feudal aspects of the old, Jefferson returned to Virginia and was elected to the Virginia House of Delegates for Albemarle County. Before his return, he had contributed to the state's constitution from Philadelphia; he continued to support freehold suffrage, by which only property holders could vote. He served as a Delegate from September 26, 1776 – June 1, 1779, as the war continued. Jefferson worked on Revision of Laws to reflect Virginia's new status as a democratic state. By abolishing primogeniture, establishing freedom of religion, and providing for general education, he hoped to make the basis of "republican government." Ending the Anglican Church as the state (or established) religion was the first step. Jefferson introduced his "Bill for Establishing Religious Freedom" in 1779, but it was not enacted until 1786, while he was in France as US Minister.

In 1778 Jefferson supported a bill to prohibit the international slave trade in Virginia; the state was the first in the union to adopt such legislation. This was significant as the slave trade would be protected from regulation for 20 years at the federal level under the new Constitution in 1787. Abolitionists in Virginia expected the new law to be followed by gradual emancipation, as Jefferson had supported this by opinion, but he discouraged such action while in the Assembly. Following his departure, the Assembly passed a law in 1782 making manumission easier. As a result, the number of free blacks in Virginia rose markedly by 1810: from 1,800 in 1782 to 12,766 in 1790, and to 30,570 by 1810, when they formed 8.2 percent of the black population in the state. He drafted 126 bills in three years, including laws to establish fee simple tenure in land, which removed inheritance strictures and to streamline the judicial system. In 1778, Jefferson's "Bill for the More General Diffusion of Knowledge" and subsequent efforts to reduce control by clergy led to some small changes at the College of William & Mary, but free public education was not established until the late nineteenth century after the Civil War. Jefferson proposed a bill to eliminate capital punishment in Virginia for all crimes except murder and treason, but his effort was defeated. In 1779, at Jefferson's behest, William and Mary appointed his mentor George Wythe as the first professor of law at an American university.

In 1779, at the age of thirty-six, Jefferson was elected Governor of Virginia by the two houses of the legislature, as was the process. The term was then for one year, and he was re-elected in 1780. As governor in 1780, he transferred the state capital from Williamsburg to Richmond. He served as a wartime governor, as the united colonies continued the Revolutionary War against Great Britain. In late 1780, Governor Jefferson prepared Richmond for attack by moving all arms, military supplies and records to a foundry located five miles outside of town. General Benedict Arnold, who had switched to the British side in 1780, learned of the transfer and moved to capture the foundry. Jefferson tried to get the supplies moved to Westham, seven miles to the north, but he was too late. He also delayed too long in raising a militia. With the Assembly, Jefferson evacuated the government in January 1781 from Richmond to Charlottesville. They began to meet at his home of Monticello. The government had moved so rapidly that he left his household slaves in Richmond, where they were captured as prisoners of war by British forces and later exchanged for captive British soldiers. In January 1781, Benedict Arnold led an armada of British ships and, with 1,600 British regulars, conducted raids along the James River. Later Arnold would join Lord Cornwallis, whose troops were marching across Virginia from the south.

In early June 1781, Cornwallis dispatched a 250-man cavalry force commanded by Banastre Tarleton on a secret expedition to capture Governor Jefferson and members of the Assembly at Monticello. Tarleton hoped to surprise Jefferson, but Jack Jouett, a captain in the Virginia militia, thwarted the British plan by warning the governor and members of the Assembly. Jefferson and his family escaped and fled to Poplar Forest, his plantation to the west. Tarleton did not allow looting or destruction at Monticello by his troops. By contrast, when British forces led by Lord Cornwallis subsequently occupied Elkhill, a smaller estate owned by Jefferson on the James River in Goochland County, Virginia, they looted and burnt the plantation. According to a letter written by Jefferson on July 16, 1788, Cornwallis used Elkhill during the ten-day occupation as a temporary headquarters; during those ten days, his men burnt all crops of corn and tobacco on the plantation in addition to its barns and fences, took all cattle, sheep, and hogs in Elkhill as sustenance, and carried off all horses capable of military service along with putting down foals too young to be useful. They also captured 27 slaves owned by Jefferson as prisoners of war, 24 of which subsequently died of smallpox or epidemic typhus.

Jefferson believed his gubernatorial term had expired in June, and he spent much of the summer with his family at Poplar Forest. The members of the General Assembly had quickly reconvened in June 1781 in Staunton, Virginia across the Blue Ridge Mountains. They voted to reward Jouett with a pair of pistols and a sword, but considered an official inquiry into Jefferson's actions, as they believed he had failed his responsibilities as governor.

The inquiry ultimately was dropped, yet Jefferson insisted on appearing before the lawmakers in December to respond to charges of mishandling his duties and abandoning leadership at a critical moment. He reported that he had believed it understood that he was leaving office and that he had discussed with other legislators the advantages of Gen. Thomas Nelson, a commander of the state militia, being appointed the governor.

(The legislature did appoint Nelson as governor in late June 1781.)

Jefferson was a controversial figure at this time, heavily criticized for inaction and failure to adequately protect the state in the face of a British invasion. Even on balance, Jefferson had failed as a state executive, leaving his successor, Thomas Nelson, Jr. to pick up the pieces.

He was not re-elected again to office in Virginia.

=== Notes on the State of Virginia ===
In 1780 Jefferson as governor received numerous questions about Virginia, posed to him by François Barbé-Marbois, then Secretary of the French delegation in Philadelphia, the temporary capital of the united colonies, who intended to gather pertinent data on the American colonies. Jefferson's responses to Marbois' "Queries" would become known as Notes on the State of Virginia (1785). Scientifically trained, Jefferson was a member of the American Philosophical Society, which had been founded in Philadelphia in 1743. He had extensive knowledge of western lands from Virginia to Illinois. In a course of five years, Jefferson enthusiastically devoted his intellectual energy to the book; he included a discussion of contemporary scientific knowledge, and Virginia's history, politics, and ethnography. Jefferson was aided by Thomas Walker, George R. Clark, and U.S. geographer Thomas Hutchins. The book was first published in France in 1785 and in England in 1787.

It has been ranked as the most important American book published before 1800. The book is Jefferson's vigorous and often eloquent argument about the nature of the good society, which he believed was incarnated by Virginia. In it he expressed his beliefs in the separation of church and state, constitutional government, checks and balances, and individual liberty. He also compiled extensive data about the state's natural resources and economy. He wrote extensively about the problems of slavery, miscegenation, and his belief that blacks and whites could not live together as free people in one society.

=== Member of Congress and Minister to France ===
Following its victory in the war and peace treaty with Great Britain, in 1783 the United States formed a Congress of the Confederation (informally called the Continental Congress), to which Jefferson was appointed as a Virginia delegate. As a member of the committee formed to set foreign exchange rates, he recommended that American currency should be based on the decimal system; his plan was adopted. Jefferson also recommended setting up the Committee of the States, to function as the executive arm of Congress. The plan was adopted but failed in practice.

Jefferson was "one of the first statesmen in any part of the world to advocate concrete measures for restricting and eradicating Negro slavery." Jefferson wrote an ordinance banning slavery in all the nation's territories (not just the Northwest), but it failed by one vote. The subsequent Northwest Ordinance prohibited slavery in the newly organized territory, but it did nothing to free slaves who were already held by settlers there; this required later actions. Jefferson was in France when the Northwest Ordinance was passed.

He resigned from Congress when he was appointed as minister to France in May 1784.

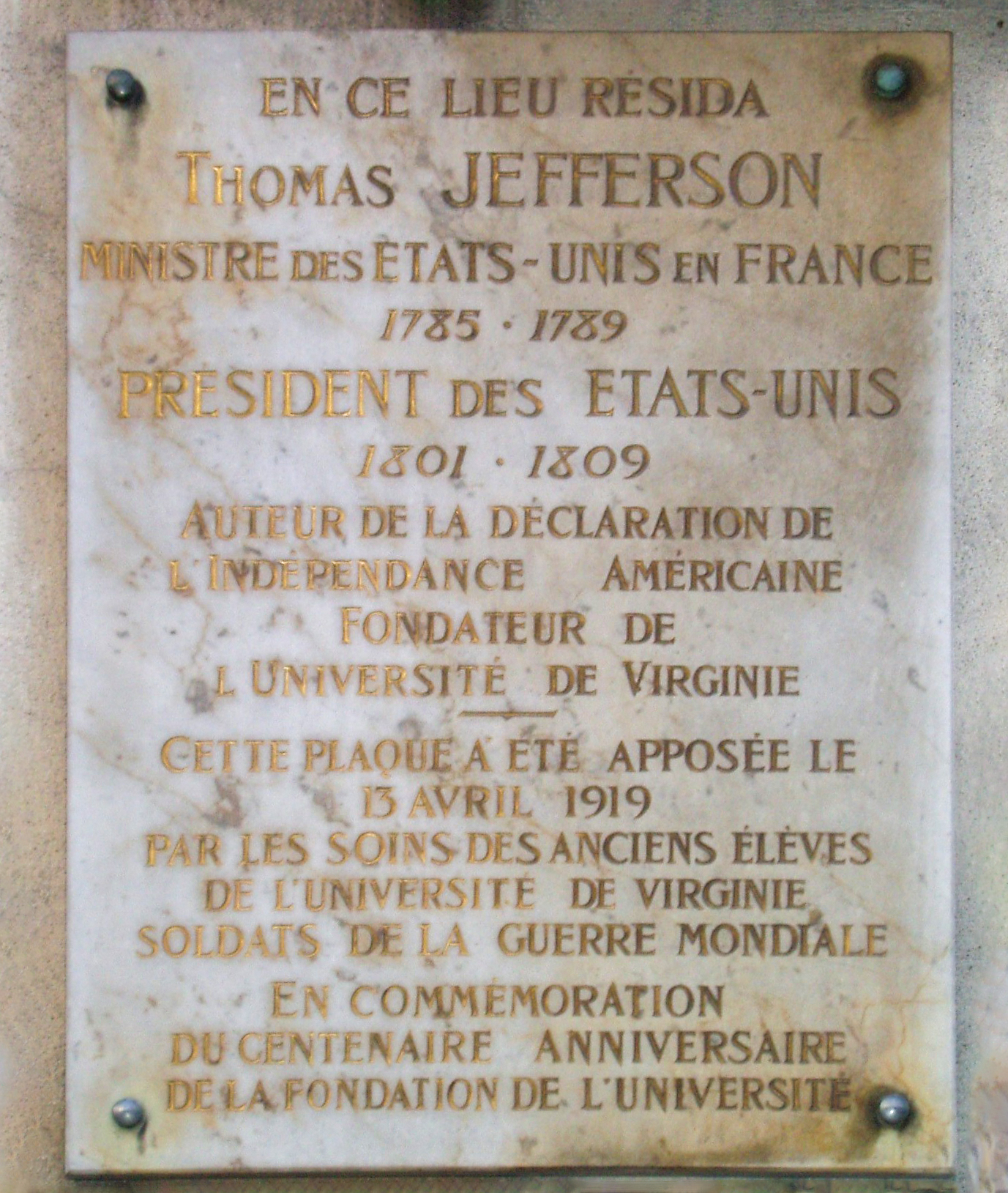
Memorial plaque marking where Jefferson lived while he was Minister to France.

The widower Jefferson, still in his 40s, was minister to France from 1785 to 1789, the year the French Revolution started. When the French foreign minister, the Count de Vergennes, commented to Jefferson, "You replace Monsieur Franklin, I hear," Jefferson replied, "I succeed him. No man can replace him."

Beginning in early September 1785, Jefferson collaborated with John Adams, US minister in London, to outline an anti-piracy treaty with Morocco. Their work culminated in a treaty that was ratified by Congress on July 18, 1787. Still in force today, it is the longest unbroken treaty relationship in U.S. history. Busy in Paris, Jefferson did not return to the US for the 1787 Constitutional Convention.

He enjoyed the architecture, arts, and the salon culture of Paris. He often dined with many of the city's most prominent people, and stocked up on wines to take back to the US. While in Paris, Jefferson corresponded with many people who had important roles in the imminent French Revolution. These included the Marquis de Lafayette, and the Comte de Mirabeau, a popular pamphleteer who repeated ideals that had been the basis for the American Revolution. His observations of social tensions contributed to his anti-clericalism and strengthened his ideas about the separation of church and state.

Jefferson's eldest daughter Martha, known as Patsy, went with him to France in 1784. His two youngest daughters were in the care of friends in the United States. To serve the household, Jefferson brought some of his slaves, including James Hemings, who trained as a French chef for his master's service.

Jefferson's youngest daughter Lucy died of whooping cough in 1785 in the United States, and he was bereft. In 1786, Jefferson met and fell in love with Maria Cosway, an accomplished Italian-English artist and musician of 27. They saw each other frequently over a period of six weeks. A married woman, she returned to Great Britain, but they maintained a lifelong correspondence.

In 1787, Jefferson sent for his youngest surviving child, Polly, then age nine. He requested that a slave accompany Polly on the trans-Atlantic voyage. By chance, Sally Hemings, a younger sister of James, was chosen; she lived in the Jefferson household in Paris for about two years. According to her son Madison Hemings, Sally and Jefferson began a sexual relationship in Paris and she became pregnant. She agreed to return to the United States as his concubine after he promised to free her children when they came of age.

=== Secretary of State ===
In September 1789 Jefferson returned to the US from France with his two daughters and slaves. Immediately upon his return, President Washington wrote to him asking him to accept a seat in his Cabinet as Secretary of State. Jefferson accepted the appointment.

As Washington's Secretary of State (1790–1793), Jefferson argued with Alexander Hamilton, the Secretary of the Treasury, about national fiscal policy, especially the funding of the debts of the war. Jefferson later associated Hamilton and the Federalists with "Royalism," and said the "Hamiltonians were panting after ... crowns, coronets and mitres." Due to their opposition to Hamilton, Jefferson and James Madison founded and led the Democratic-Republican Party. He worked with Madison and his campaign manager John J. Beckley to build a nationwide network of Republican allies. Jefferson's political actions and his attempt to undermine Hamilton nearly led Washington to dismiss Jefferson from his cabinet. Although Jefferson left the cabinet voluntarily, Washington never forgave him for his actions, and never spoke to him again.

The French minister said in 1793: "Senator Morris and Secretary of the Treasury Hamilton ... had the greatest influence over the President's mind, and that it was only with difficulty that he [Jefferson] counterbalanced their efforts." Jefferson supported France against Britain when they fought in 1793. Jefferson believed that political success at home depended on the success of the French army in Europe. In 1793, the French minister Edmond-Charles Genêt caused a crisis when he tried to influence public opinion by appealing to the American people, something which Jefferson tried to stop.

Jefferson tried to achieve three important goals during his discussions with George Hammond, British Minister to the U.S.: secure British admission of violating the Treaty of Paris (1783); vacate their posts in the Northwest (the territory between the Appalachian Mountains and the Mississippi River north of the Ohio); and compensate the United States to pay American slave owners for the slaves whom the British had freed and evacuated at the end of the war. Chester Miller notes that after failing to gain agreement on any of these, Jefferson resigned in December 1793.

=== Election of 1796 and Vice Presidency ===
In late 1793, Jefferson retired to Monticello, from where he continued to oppose the policies of Hamilton and Washington. The Jay Treaty of 1794, led by Hamilton, brought peace and trade with Britain – while Madison, with strong support from Jefferson, wanted "to strangle the former mother country" without going to war. "It became an article of faith among Republicans that 'commercial weapons' would suffice to bring Great Britain to any terms the United States chose to dictate." Even during the violence of the Reign of Terror in France, Jefferson refused to disavow the revolution because "To back away from France would be to undermine the cause of republicanism in America." As vice president, Jefferson conducted secret talks with the French, in which he advocated that the French government take a more aggressive position against the American government, which he thought was too close to the British. He succeeded in getting the American ambassador expelled from France.

As the Democratic-Republican presidential candidate in 1796, Jefferson lost to John Adams, but had enough electoral votes to become Vice President (1797–1801). One of the chief duties of a vice president is presiding over the Senate, and Jefferson was concerned about its lack of rules leaving decisions to the discretion of the presiding officer. Years before holding his first office, Jefferson had spent much time researching procedures and rules for governing bodies. As a student, he had transcribed notes on British parliamentary law into a manual which he would later call his Parliamentary Pocket Book. Jefferson had also served on the committee appointed to draw up the rules of order for the Continental Congress in 1776. As Vice President, he was ready to reform Senatorial procedures. Prompted by the immediate need, he wrote A Manual of Parliamentary Practice, a document which the House of Representatives follows to the present day.

With the Quasi-War underway, the Federalists under John Adams started rebuilding the military, levied new taxes, and enacted the Alien and Sedition Acts. Jefferson believed that these acts were intended to suppress Democratic-Republicans rather than dangerous enemy aliens, although the acts were allowed to expire. Jefferson and Madison rallied opposition support by anonymously writing the Kentucky and Virginia Resolutions, which declared that the federal government had no right to exercise powers not specifically delegated to it by the states. Though the resolutions followed the "interposition" approach of Madison, Jefferson advocated nullification. At one point he drafted a threat for Kentucky to secede. (Note: Jefferson's draft said: "where powers are assumed [by the federal government] which have not been delegated, a nullification of the act is the rightful remedy: that every State has a natural right in cases not within the compact, (casus non fœderis) to nullify of their own authority all assumptions of power by others within their limits." See Jefferson's draft of the Kentucky Resolutions of 1798.) Jefferson's biographer Dumas Malone argued that had his actions become known at the time, Jefferson might have been impeached for treason. In writing the Kentucky Resolutions, Jefferson warned that, "unless arrested at the threshold," the Alien and Sedition Acts would "necessarily drive these states into revolution and blood." The historian Ron Chernow says, "[H]e wasn't calling for peaceful protests or civil disobedience: he was calling for outright rebellion, if needed, against the federal government of which he was vice president."

Chernow believes that Jefferson "thus set forth a radical doctrine of states' rights that effectively undermined the constitution." He argues that neither Jefferson nor Madison sensed that they had sponsored measures as inimical as the Alien and Sedition Acts. The historian Garry Wills argued, "Their nullification effort, if others had picked it up, would have been a greater threat to freedom than the misguided [alien and sedition] laws, which were soon rendered feckless by ridicule and electoral pressure." The theoretical damage of the Kentucky and Virginia resolutions was "deep and lasting, and was a recipe for disunion". George Washington was so appalled by them that he told Patrick Henry that if "systematically and pertinaciously pursued", they would "dissolve the union or produce coercion." The influence of Jefferson's doctrine of states' rights reverberated to the Civil War and beyond.

According to Chernow, during the Quasi-War, Jefferson engaged in a "secret campaign to sabotage Adams in French eyes." In the spring of 1797, he held four confidential talks with the French consul Joseph Letombe. In these private meetings, Jefferson attacked Adams, predicted that he would only serve one term, and encouraged France to invade England. Jefferson advised Letombe to stall any American envoys sent to Paris by instructing them to "listen to them and then drag out the negotiations at length and mollify them by the urbanity of the proceedings." This toughened the tone that the French government adopted with the new Adams Administration. Due to pressure against the Adams Administration from Jefferson and his supporters, Congress released the papers related to the XYZ Affair, which rallied a shift in popular opinion from Jefferson and the French government to supporting Adams.

== Ancestry ==
Ancestors of Thomas Jefferson

8. Thomas Jefferson
4. Thomas Jefferson
18. Christopher Branch
9. Mary Branch
19. Mary Francis Addie
2. Peter Jefferson
20. James Field
10. Peter Field
21. (Note: Peter Field's mother may be Ann Rogers Clark (a widow), Anne Clark, Anna Clark, Sarah Clark, or someone else/unknown. A citation from a reliable source is needed.)
5. Mary Field
22. Henry Soane
11. Judith Soane
23. Judith Fuller
1. Thomas Jefferson
24. Richard Randolph
12. William Randolph
25. Elizabeth Ryland
6. Isham Randolph of Dungeness
26. Henry Isham
13. Mary Isham
27. Katherine Banks
3. Jane Randolph
14. Charles Rogers
7. Jane Rogers
30. William Lilburn
15. Jane Lilburn
31. Elizabeth Nicholson

== See also ==
- Bibliography of Thomas Jefferson

== Further reading and bibliography ==
- Gordon-Reed, Annette. The Hemingses of Monticello: an American Family. (W.W. Norton & Company, 2008); (Pulitzer Prize winner)
- Malone, Dumas (1948). Jefferson, The Virginian. Jefferson and His Time. Vol. 1. Little Brown. OCLC 1823927.
- Peterson, Merrill D. Thomas Jefferson and the New Nation: A Biography (Oxford U.P., 1975)
