= Thomas Randolph of Tuckahoe =

American politician (1683–1729)

Thomas Randolph

Member Virginia House of Burgesses for Henrico County
- In office 1720–1722 Serving with William Randolph
- Preceded by: John Bolling
- Succeeded by: John Bolling

Personal details
- Born: June 1683 Turkey Island Plantation, Colonial Virginia
- Died: 1729 Henrico County, Colonial Virginia
- Spouse: Judith Fleming (m. 1712)
- Children: 3, including William
- Occupation: Planter, militia officer, politician

Military service
- Branch/service: Henrico County, Virginia militia

Thomas Randolph (June 1683 – 1729), also known as Thomas Randolph of Tuckahoe, was the first European settler at Tuckahoe, a member of the House of Burgesses, and the second child of William Randolph and Mary Isham, daughter of Henry Isham and Katherine Isham (Banks).

== Early life ==
Coat of Arms of William Randolph

Randolph was born in June 1683 on the Turkey Island Plantation along the James River in Henrico County, Virginia. (Note: Page states that he was born in 1681. There are other sources that state he was born about 1683, without the month.) He was the son of the English immigrant William Randolph who established Turkey Island along the James River, and Mary Royall Isham, the daughter of Henry Isham. They descend from Ishams of Northamptonshire in England. Children born to the Randolphs were William, Thomas, Isham, Richard, Henry of Longfield, Edward, Mary, John, and Elizabeth. Randolph studied at the College of William & Mary.

All of the sons took active and prominent part in the affairs of the Colony, and each received a large patrimony in the distribution of the great estate of their father. Most of them built fine houses and became known by the names of their estates.

— Jefferson Randolph Anderson

William Randolph acquired land probably used as outlying quarter plantations during his lifetime. He died in 1711 and left property to each son, along with enslaved people to work the land.

== Career ==
=== Planter ===
William Byrd hired Randolph to oversee his Westover Plantation around March 6, 1712. Thomas inherited land from his father and purchased additional adjoining acreage on September 4, 1714, from his brother John for £90 sterling, the total of which became the Tuckahoe plantation. (Note: There are a number of theories about Randolph having received the land before that time, but the land records show that he could not have owned the land until 1714. The land was acquired by his father by the time he created his will on May 6, 1711. His brother inherited the land for Tuckahoe, which he sold to Thomas in 1714.) He owned 3,256 acres of land on which Randolph likely built a modest wood-frame house so that he could focus his energy on establishing and operating the plantation. (Note: Dendrochronology analysis on the current Tuckahoe house reveals the present dwelling was most likely constructed beginning ca. 1735.) The first church in the area, Dover Church, was built in 1720 by Thomas, who covered the cost with 54,990 pounds of tobacco. Until 1728, the area was mostly wilderness with just a few homesteads. Rev. William Douglass, the first permanent resident minister for the church, was not established in Northam of St. James Parish until 1750. Randolph's estate was in the part of Henrico County that later became Goochland County. In 1727, he also bought Farrar's Island in the James River from Thomas Farrar (who already lived in St. James Parish that became Goochland County that year) and his nephew, William Farrar IV (who moved to Goochland County). That plantation, which had been founded by William Farrar Jr. nearly a century earlier, ultimately became part of Chesterfield County.

=== Politician ===
Randolph became one of the justices of the peace for Henrico county in 1713. Randolph and his brother William Randolph II were the two representatives from Henrico in the House of Burgesses for the 1720 to 1722 session. Goochland was set apart from Henrico County in 1727. A year later, he was the county lieutenant for Goochland.

== Personal life ==
Thomas Randolph of Henrico County married Judith Fleming on October 16, 1712. (Note: Thomas' wife was Judith Fleming. There was a belief among some that Judith Churchill of Middlesex was Thomas' wife. However, there are a series of records that show that his wife was Judith Fleming: 1) A marriage record shows that Thomas Randolph of Henrico County married Judith Fleming on October 16, 1712. 2) She married Nicholas Davies in 1733, which was witnessed by the bride's brothers, John and Tarleton Fleming. 3) Two deeds showed that William Randolph III's mother was Judith Fleming Davies. The theory that Thomas married Judith Churchill by historian William Edward Railey is now known to be incorrect. There was confusion about family members named Judith; one was Judith Fleming, married to Thomas Randolph; and the other was Judith Wormeley (1694-1716), step-daughter of Col. William Churchill, married to Mann Page in 1712, and mother of Maria Judith (Page) Randolph.) Judith, born about 1689, was the daughter of Susanna Tarleton and Charles Fleming of New Kent County and the sister of John and Tarleton Fleming. (Note: Charles Fleming is a planter with land next to Isham Randolph and on the upper James River at Howard's Neck in New Kent County, Virginia, where he was an important Quaker. He owned Castle Rock Plantation.)

The Randolphs had three children:

- William Randolph III (born 1712 or 1713) married Maria Judith, the daughter of Mann Page, and had four children, including their only son Thomas Mann Randolph Sr.
- Judith Randolph (born ~1724) married her first cousin William Stith, 3rd President of the College of William and Mary, and had three children. Stith was the son of her Captain John Stith and Mary Randolph, her aunt.
- Mary Randolph (born ~1726) married Rev. James Keith (Note: The claim that he was a descendant of the Earls Marischal of Scotland conflates Rev. James Keith of Virginia with Field Marshal James Francis Edward Keith of Scotland (1696-1758), brother to the last Earl Marischal.) and had eight children. (Note: Some references indicate the husband of Mary Randolph to be William Keith.) Their daughter Mary Randolph Keith was the mother of John Marshall, a United States Secretary of State and 4th Chief Justice of the United States.

Thomas died in 1729 or 1730. Judith married Nicolas Davies, an immigrant from Wales, on December 24, 1733.

Randolph was a great-uncle of United States President Thomas Jefferson.

== Ancestry ==
Ancestors of Thomas Randolph of Tuckahoe

16. Robert Randolph
8. William Randolph
17. Rosa Roberts
4. Richard Randolph
18. Richard Lane
9. Dorothy Lane
19. Elizabeth Vincent
2. William Randolph
20. John Rilande
10. Richard Ryland
21. Maria Canning
5. Elizabeth Ryland
11. Elizabeth Harward
1. Thomas Randolph
24. Sir Euseby Isham
12. William Isham
25. Anne Borlase
6. Henry Isham
26. William Brett
13. Mary Brett
27. Mary Toddington
3. Mary Isham
28. Christopher Banks
14. Christopher Banks
29. Alice Foxe
7. Catherine Banks
30. John Royall
15. Janet Royall
31. Angeline

== See also ==
- First Families of Virginia
- Randolph family of Virginia
