= Isham Randolph of Dungeness =

American planter, grandfather of Thomas Jefferson

Isham Randolph
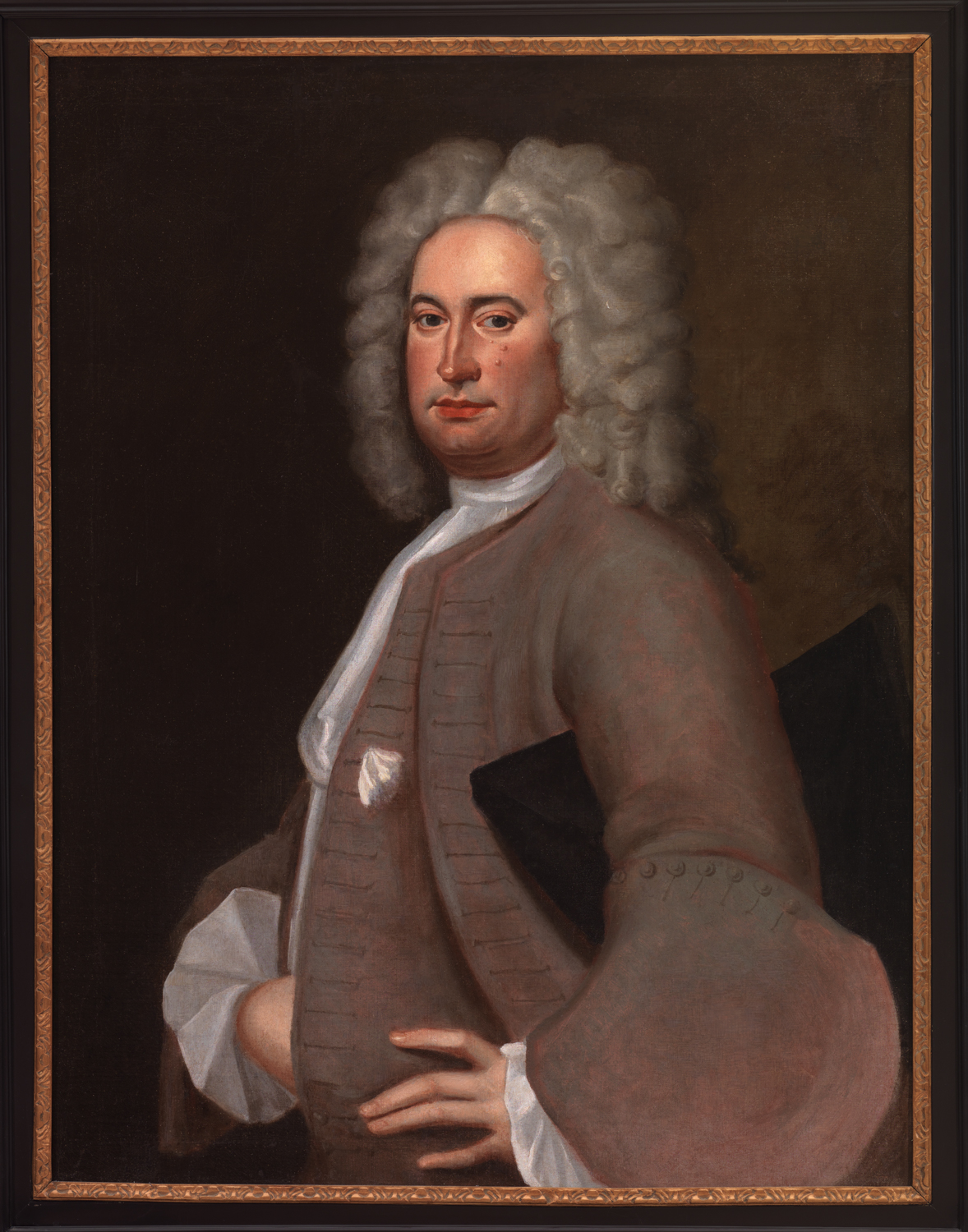
- Portrait, c. 1729

Member of the House of Burgesses for Goochland County
- In office 1738–1741 Serving with James Holman
- Preceded by: Edward Scott
- Succeeded by: William Randolph III

Personal details
- Born: February 24, 1687 Turkey Island, Henrico County, Virginia, British America
- Died: November 2, 1742 (aged 55) Goochland County, Virginia, British America
- Resting place: Turkey Island, Virginia
- Spouse: Jane Rogers (m. 1717)
- Relations: Thomas Jefferson (grandson); Charles Lilburn Lewis (grandson); James Pleasants (grandson)
- Children: 11, including Jane
- Parents: William Randolph (father); Mary Isham (mother)

Isham Randolph (February 24, 1687 – November 2, 1742) was an American planter, shipmaster, merchant, military officer and politician who served a partial term in the House of Burgesses representing Goochland County. He is also the maternal grandfather of United States President Thomas Jefferson.

== Early life ==
Coat of Arms of William Randolph

Isham Randolph was born on the Turkey Island plantation in Henrico County, Virginia on February 24, 1687. He was the third son of William Randolph (1650–1711) and wife Mary Isham (c. 1659–1735). His father was a colonist, landowner, planter, and merchant who served as the 26th Speaker of the Virginia House of Burgesses.

Randolph graduated from the College of William & Mary.

== Career ==
Like his father, Isham Randolph farmed tobacco and other crops using enslaved labor. In 1730, Randolph built "Dungeness," an English manor styled house on what became a large tobacco plantations, near Goochland, Virginia just west of Fine Creek (near the Fine Creek Mills Historic District). That land had seemed near the frontier when it was acquired, 40 miles from Richmond, Virginia. but Dungeness became a house of "refinement and elegant hospitality" with a hundred or more servants.

Randolph was also a prominent merchant and shipmaster, traveling across the Atlantic Ocean to London many times. A well-established merchant in London, Randolph became agent for the colony of Virginia, but returned by October 1725 when his second daughter, Mary, was born. In addition to bringing indentured servants to the colony, Randoph also participated in the triangular trade, and slaves to colonial Virginia.

Like his good friend, Colonel William Byrd, Randolph had an interest in science and engaged in amateur science circles while in London. He was noted for his abilities as a naturalist by members of the Royal Society. Upon the recommendation of naturalist John Bartram, Randolph was visited by botanist Peter Collinson and led an excursion to gather specimens in colonial Virginia.

In 1738, Randolph succeeded Abraham Nicholas as the adjutant general of Virginia. The following year, he became a colonel of the militia of Goochland County. Around the same time, Randolph also succeeded Edward Scott of Manakintown, who died in 1738, as one of Goochland County's two representatives to the House of Burgesses.

== Marriage and children ==
In 1717, Isham Randolph married Jane Rogers in London at St. Paul's Church in the Shadwell parish (today east London). Jane was from a wealthy landed gentry family of England and Scotland. Isham and Jane Randolph moved to Virginia. Together, they had nine children (Note: Robert Isham Randolph, whose grandfather's grandfather was Thomas Randolph, wrote that various sources erroneously treat sons Thomas and Isham as one child named "Thomas Isham". He also noted that some sources list birthdates for the children well after Isham Randolph of Dungeness had died in 1742.) and were familially connected to many other prominent individuals:

- Isham Randolph (1718-1718), lived only ten days.
- Jane Randolph (1720–1776), who married Peter Jefferson and had nine children, including Thomas Jefferson, the third President of the United States.
- Isham Randolph (born August 18, 1724), married Sarah Hargreaves in 1749, in Philadelphia.
- Mary Randolph (born October 15, 1725, in Colonial Williamsburg), who married Colonel Charles Lewis of Buck Island and had eight children, including Charles Lilburn Lewis, one of the founders of Milton, Virginia.
- Elizabeth Randolph (born 1727)
- William Randolph (1729–1791), married Elizabeth Little on 31 July 1761, in London and would died in Bristol
- Dorothea Randolph (born November 24, 1730) who married John Woodson
- Thomas Randolph (1732-173?), died young.
- Ann Randolph (born February 5, 1735), who had four children in three marriages. She was the mother of James Pleasants Jr., the 22nd Governor of Virginia, via her last marriage to James Pleasants Sr.
- Thomas Randolph (born August 13, 1736), who married Jane Cary, the daughter of Archibald Cary, in 1768.
- Susannah Randolph (born September 25, 1738), who married Carter Henry Harrison I (the brother of Benjamin Harrison V, the son of Benjamin Harrison IV, and the grandson of Benjamin Harrison III and Robert "King" Carter) and had six children. She was the great-grandmother of Carter Henry Harrison III, a five-time mayor of Chicago.

== Death and legacy ==
Randolph died in November 1742 and was buried on Turkey Island. In his will he assigned guardians of his children, including his son-in-law, Peter Jefferson (the father of President Thomas Jefferson.) His nephew William Randolph III (1712–1745; son of Thomas Randolph of Tuckahoe) would succeed him in the House of Burgesses but serve only one session (with his cousin of the same name representing Charles City County downstream).

The distinguished qualities of the Gentleman he possessed in an eminent degree: To justice probity & honor so firmly attached that no view of secular interest or worldly advantage, no discouraging frowns of fortune could alter his Steady purpose of heart. By an easy Compliance and obliging deportment he new no enemy but gained many friends; this in life meriting an universal esteem.

— From the inscription on his tomb

== Ancestry ==
Ancestors of Isham Randolph of Dungeness

8. William Randolph
4. Richard Randolph
9. Dorothy Lane
2. William Randolph
10. Richard Ryland
5. Elizabeth Ryland
11. Elizabeth Harward
1. Isham Randolph
12. William Isham
6. Henry Isham
13. Mary Brett
3. Mary Isham
14. Christopher Banks
7. Catherine Banks
15. Janet Royall

== See also ==
- Ancestry of Thomas Jefferson
- Jane Randolph Jefferson § Ancestry
