= Christopher Branch =

English settler in Colonial Virginia and tobacco planter

Christopher Branch (circa 1600–1681) was an early English settler in Colonial Virginia, tobacco planter, and a member and justice of the House of Burgesses. He was a three times great-grandfather of United States President Thomas Jefferson.

== Early life and marriage ==
Coat of Arms of Christopher Branch

Branch was born in England around 1600. or 1602. His parents were Lionel Branch and Valentia Sparks of London. He married Mary Francis Addie, daughter of Francis Addie of Darton, Yorkshire, on 2 September 1619 in St. Peter's, Westcheap, London.

Christopher and Mary Branch sailed to Virginia on the London Merchant in March 1621 and survived the Powhatan attack of 1622 the following year. (Note: Or they may have sailed in March 1619/1620.) They were living at Colledg Land in Henrico by February 1623 when their son Thomas was nine months old. According to the William and Mary Quarterly, Thomas was born in 1623. They then had two more sons. William was born in 1625 and Christopher was born about 1627. His granddaughter Mary became the great-grandmother of President Thomas Jefferson, making him the three times great-grandfather of the president.

== Career ==
Branch acquired land in Henrico (now Chesterfield) County on the south side of the James River and north of Proctors Creek beginning in or before 1634 (Note: In 1634 Branch patented 100 acres (0.40 km^{2}) of land in Henrico County, Virginia. In September 1636, he patented land in the same section as the first patent, and on 18 December 1636, he patented 250 acres (1.0 km^{2}) known as Kingsland Plantation.) and established the Kingsland and Arrahattock Plantations. Branch first settled at Arrahattock on the north side of the James River. The Kingsland Plantation, which grew to 450 acres by 1639, was located across the river from Arrahattock. (Note: Remnants of Kingsland Plantation can be seen from Kingsland Road, which runs from Highway 5 across old Kingsland plantation to the James.) Branch operated a tobacco plantation and due to a glut in the market, a limit of the tobacco crop to a percentage per planter was established by the Virginia General Assembly. The remainder of the tobacco crop was to be destroyed.

In 1639 he was a member of the House of Burgesses from Henrico County and was named a tobacco inspector that year. He was a member of the House of Burgesses again in 1641. In 1656, he was the Justice of Henrico County. He died in 1681 while living on the Kingsland Plantation. His wife, Mary, died many years earlier, likely before 1630.

== See also ==
- The article of Jefferson's father Peter Jefferson § Ancestry
- Ancestry of Thomas Jefferson
