= William Randolph III (son of Thomas) =

American politician and county clerk

William Randolph
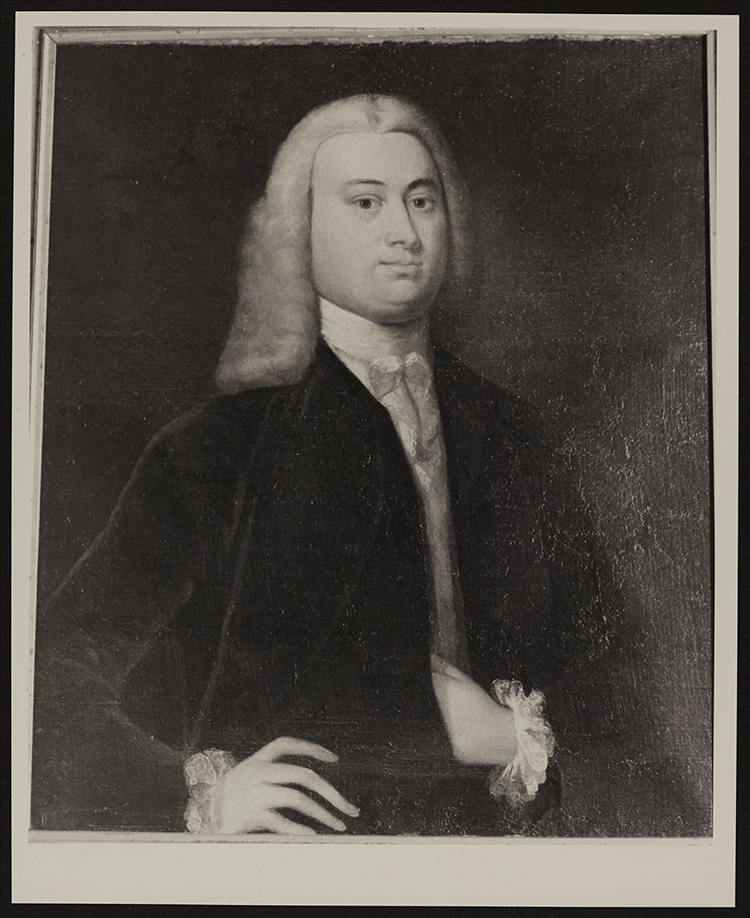

Member of the House of Burgesses for Goochland County
- In office 1738–1741 Serving with Benjamin Cocke
- Preceded by: Isham Randolph
- Succeeded by: George Carrington

Personal details
- Born: 1713 or 1714 Virginia
- Died: 1745 Tuckahoe, Virginia
- Children: Thomas Mann Randolph Sr.
- Parent(s): Thomas Randolph, Judith Fleming (Note: William's mother was Judith Fleming. Some thought Judith Churchill of Middlesex was Thomas' wife and William's mother. However, records show that his mother was Judith Fleming: 1) A marriage record shows that Thomas Randolph of Henrico (county for Tuckahoe at that time) married Judith Fleming on October 16, 1712. 2) She married Nicholas Davies in 1733, and she was the sister of John and Tarleton Fleming. 3) Two deeds showed that William Randolph's mother was Judith Fleming Davies.)
- Relatives: Jane Randolph Jefferson (Thomas Jefferson's mother); William Randolph (grandfather)
- Occupation: Planter
- Known for: Building Tuckahoe manor, friend and relative of the Jeffersons

William Randolph (1712 or 1713–1745) was an American planter, politician and county clerk. He was the son of Thomas Randolph of Tuckahoe in Goochland County, Virginia. He built the elegant two-story residence for Tuckahoe. Randolph held the positions of Clerk and Justice in Goochland County and he represented the county as a member of the House of Burgesses. He was the first Clerk of Albemarle County.

He was a good friend of Peter Jefferson, whose wife Jane Randolph Jefferson was Randolph's first cousin. The Jeffersons raised Randolph's children after his wife's death in 1743 and his death in 1745.

== Early life ==
Coat of Arms of William Randolph

William was born in 1712 or 1713 to the former Judith Fleming and her planter husband Thomas Randolph of Tuckahoe. Descended on both sides from the First Families of Virginia, he was named to honor his grandfather William Randolph of Turkey Island (who died in 1711). His maternal grandparents were Susanna Tarleton and Charles Fleming of New Kent County. William had two sisters, Maria Judith and Mary Isham.

His father, Thomas Randolph established Tuckahoe plantation when this man was a boy, purchasing that particular parcel from his youngest brother (this man's uncle) John on September 4, 1714. In 1720, Thomas Randolph spent an additional 54,990 pounds of tobacco to finance construction of first church in the area, Dover Church. Until 1728, the area was mostly wilderness with just a few homesteads. Thomas died in 1730. His widow Judith remarried, to Nicolas Davies, an immigrant from Wales, on December 24, 1733.

== Career ==
=== Planter ===
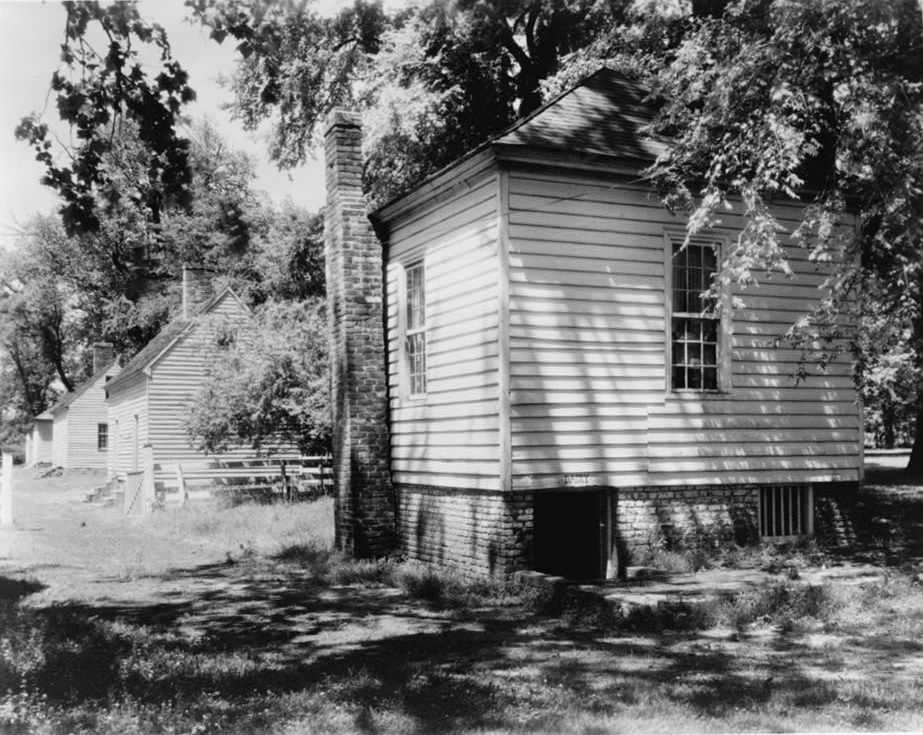
"Residence, cabin, on James River, Tuckahoe Plantation, Goochland County, Virginia" by Frances Benjamin Johnston, c. 1905-1933. The schoolhouse for the Jefferson and Randolph children is in the foreground

William Byrd of Westover visited Judith and questioned the difficulties the eighteen-year-old might face for taking on significant responsibilities before getting a good education. In any event, Randolph became an able manager of the family's plantation and fit in well with the "elite planter culture". Household and farm work was performed by indentured servants and enslaved men, women, and children. (Note: In 1859, there were 62 slaves that worked in the house, as cooks, a smith, or as field hands. From the records of that time, children began working in the fields by age 11.) The slave quarters at Tuckahoe were larger than most slave quarters, which could be as small as 12 by 8 feet. They were about 16 by 20 feet, but were divided into two units, which were separated by a central chimney. Each room had an exterior door.

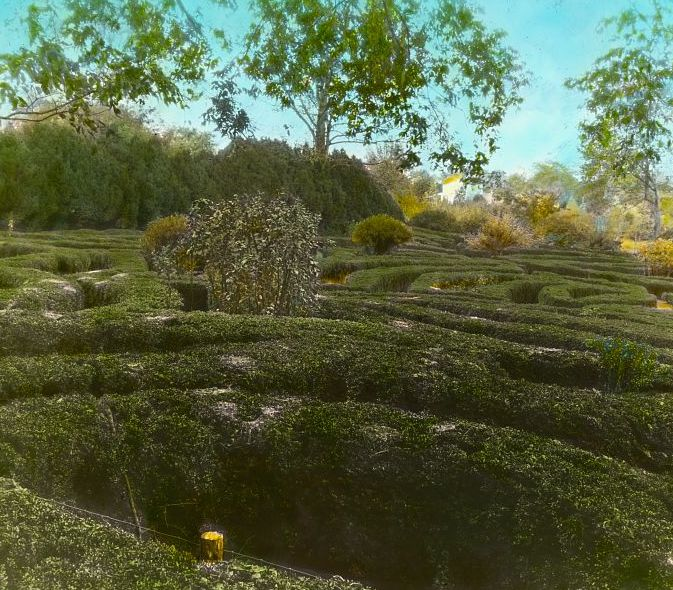
A 1936 view from the schoolhouse of boxwood maze, which was destroyed in the 1970s by blight. A path lined by boxwood plants was created along the former maze's perimeter.

Tuckahoe, located along the James River in Goochland County, Virginia, was near the properties of his uncle, Isham Randolph of Dungeness, and Peter and Jane Jefferson. He patented 2400 acres in what is now Albemarle County. The land was adjacent to a 2000-acre tract owned by Peter Jefferson. Randolph sold 200 acres that were adjacent to Peter Jefferson's Shadwell property in 1741 to Jefferson, who used it for the site of his home with his wife Jane. (Note: On May 18, 1736, Peter Jefferson received an option to buy 200 acres of land from Randolph. The £50 payment for the property was recorded on May 16, 1841.)

=== Politics ===
He worked for Goochland County as the Clerk and as one of the justices of the peace who jointly governed the county in that era. In 1742 he succeeded his uncle Isham Randolph of Dungeness (who had died) as one of the men representing Goochland County in the House of Burgesses, alongside Benjamin Cocke. Later in that session the legislature created Albemarle County from the western part of Goochland County, so George Carrington succeeded him as the other burgess for Goochland. In 1744, Randolph became the first Clerk of Albemarle County.

== Marriage and children ==
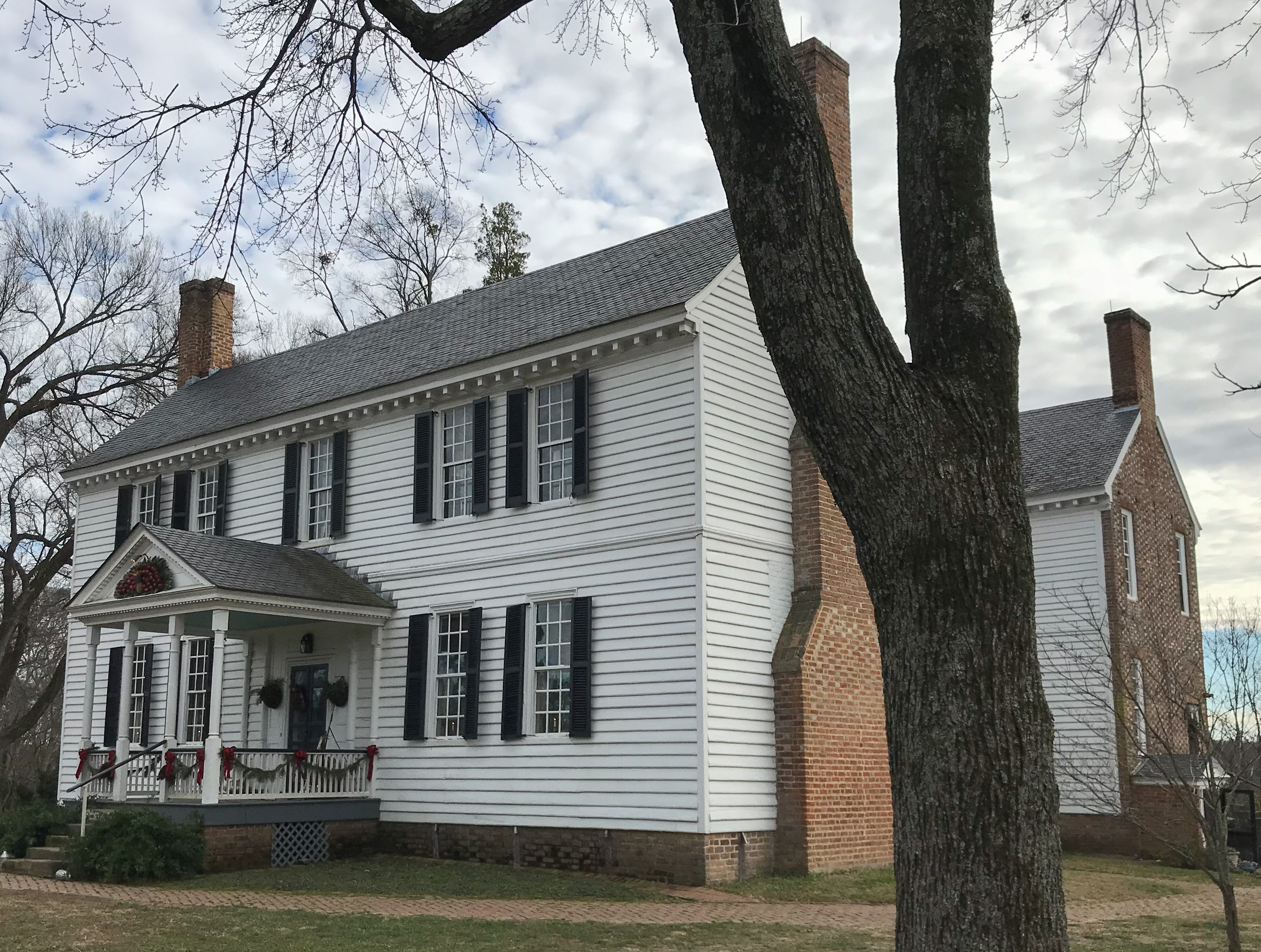
Tuckahoe Plantation - view of the whole house, which has a rare H shape.

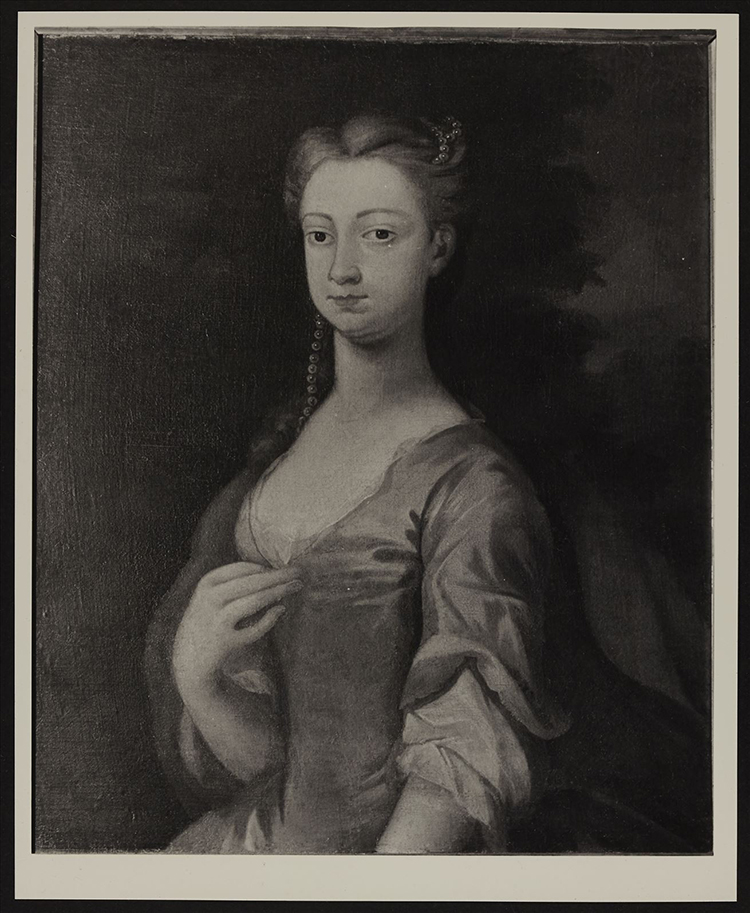
Maria Judith Page

In 1733, Randolph started building a two-story house on Tuckahoe. In 1735, he married Maria Judith Page, the daughter of Hon. Mann Page and Judith Wormsley or Wormeley of Rosewell. Known as Mary, she had a dowry of £2000 sterling, which the couple used to finish building the mansion for Tuckahoe. It was completed in 1840 and The Washington Post said that it is "one of the James River's most famous plantations.

They had four children, including their only son Thomas Mann Randolph Sr.

== Death ==
When Maria died by 1742, Randolph wrote out a will in late 1745, shortly before his death, knowing that his three children would become orphans.

Whereas I have appointed by my will that my dear only son Thomas Mann Randolph should have a private education given him in my house at Tuckahoe, my will is that my dear and loving friend Mr. Peter Jefferson do move down with his family to my Tuckahoe house and remain there till my son comes of age with whom my dear son and his sisters shall live.

— William Randolph

Although Peter Jefferson had intended to establish a plantation off the Rivanna River, he instead moved his family to Tuckahoe in 1746 and raised William and Maria Judith's children there until 1752, (Note: A few sources say it was in 1751 and others, such as presidential historian Jon Meacham, say it was 1752,) when Thomas Randolph was 11 years of age.

(Note: An "English school" was established in a one-room schoolhouse for the children: three Randolph children, Thomas Jefferson, and his three sisters. They had coursework in the English and Latin languages. Thomas Mann Randolph was a childhood friend, legal client, and business partner of Jefferson throughout their lives. Jefferson's daughter Martha married Thomas Mann Randolph's son Thomas Mann Randolph Jr. in 1790. Thomas Jefferson came to formulate his moral viewpoints about slavery from his formative years, from about two years of age until the age of 9, at Tuckahoe: The whole commerce between master and slave is a perpetual exercise of the most boisterous passions, the most unremitting despotism on the one part, and degrading submissions on the other. Our children see this, and learn to imitate it… — Thomas Jefferson, Notes on the State of Virginia) During that time Jefferson managed the plantation, was executor of William Randolph’s estate, and was guardian of the children. It was considered unusual that he did not chose a Randolph family member to be guardian of his children or executor of his estate.

== See also ==
- First Families of Virginia
- Randolph family of Virginia
