= George L. Rives =

American lawyer, politician and author

George Lockhart Rives
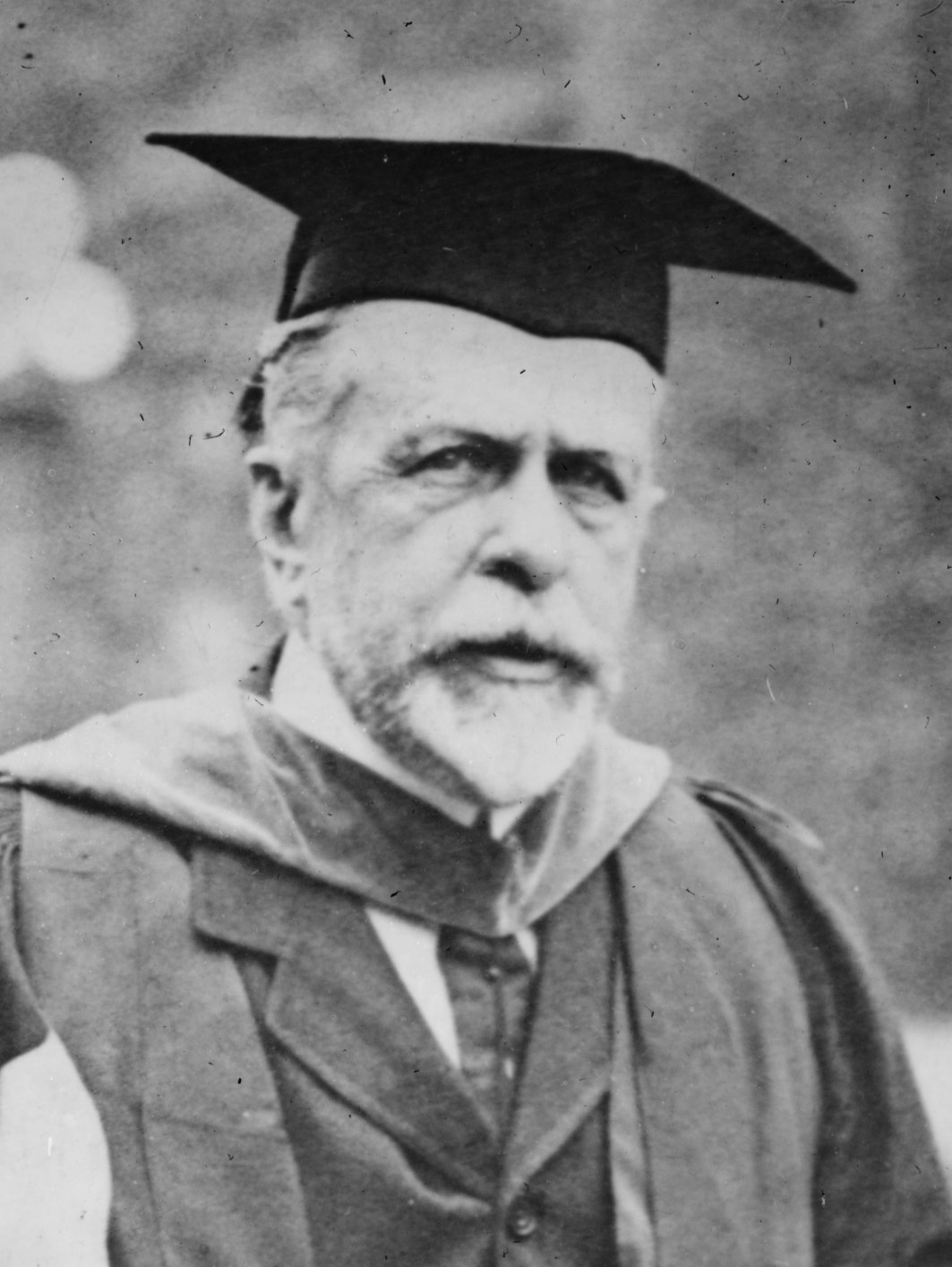

United States Assistant Secretary of State
- In office November 19, 1887 – March 5, 1889
- President: Grover Cleveland
- Preceded by: James D. Porter
- Succeeded by: William F. Wharton

Personal details
- Born: May 1, 1849 New York City, U.S.
- Died: August 18, 1917 (aged 68) Newport, Rhode Island, U.S.
- Spouses: Caroline Morris Kean (m. 1873; died 1887) Sarah Swan Whiting Belmont (m. 1889)
- Parent(s): Francis Robert Rives; Matilda Antonia Barclay
- Relatives: William C. Rives (grandfather); Alfred Rives (uncle); Amélie Rives (cousin)
- Education: Columbia College; Trinity College, Cambridge; Columbia Law School

George Lockhart Rives (May 1, 1849 – August 18, 1917), was an American lawyer, politician, and author who served as United States Assistant Secretary of State from 1887 to 1889.

== Early life ==
Rives was born in New York City on May 1, 1849, to Francis Robert Rives and Matilda Antonia (née Barclay) Rives. His father was the secretary of the American legation at London under U.S. Minister to Great Britain Edward Everett during the William Henry Harrison administration.

Rives was a descendant of the Schuyler, the Van Cortlandt and the Delancey families. His paternal grandparents were Judith Page (née Walker) Rives, who inherited the Castle Hill plantation in Virginia from her father Francis Walker, (Note: Francis Walker (1764–1806), a U.S. Representative from Virginia, was a brother of John Walker (1744–1809), a U.S. Senator from Virginia, and son of physician and explorer Dr. Thomas Walker (1715–1794), considered to be the "first white man who entered Kentucky".) and William Cabell Rives, a U.S. Senator and Minister to France who studied law under Thomas Jefferson and was a friend of James Madison. (Note: William Cabell Rives (1793–1868), also a delegate from Virginia to the Provisional Confederate Congress and member of the Confederate Congress from Virginia, was the brother of Alexander Rives (1806–1885), a Judge of the Virginia Supreme Court of Appeals and Judge of United States District Court for the Western District of Virginia, appointed by President Ulysses S. Grant.) George's uncle was noted engineer Alfred Landon Rives and his first cousin was author Amélie Rives, who married John Armstrong Chanler (a descendant of John Jacob Astor) and, later, Russian Prince Pierre Troubetzkoy. His maternal grandparents were Louisa Anna Matilda (née Aufrére) Barclay and U.S. Civil War General George Barclay, who owned Carnwath Manor in Wappinger, New York. (Note: George Barclay (1790–1869) was the son of Susan DeLancey Barclay (1754–1837), a granddaughter of Stephen Delancey, Thomas Henry Barclay (1753–1830), an American lawyer who became one of the United Empire Loyalists serving as Speaker of the House of Assembly of Nova Scotia. George's sister, Susannah Barclay (1785–1805), was married to Peter Gerard Stuyvesant (1777–1847). Louisa Anna Matilda Aufrére (1792–1868) was the daughter of Anthony Aufrère (1757–1833), the antiquary and barrister who was descended from the Huguenot Antoine Aufrère, Marquis de Corville, who fled from France in 1685.)

He graduated from Columbia College in 1868 with a B.A., and again in 1872 with an A.M. At Columbia, George L. Rives was a member of the Philolexian Society. Also in 1872, he graduated from Trinity College, Cambridge, and then from Columbia Law School in 1873.

== Career ==
Following his graduation from Columbia Law School, he passed the bar and began practicing law in New York City.

In 1887, Rives was appointed Assistant Secretary of State for Latin Affairs by President Grover Cleveland to replace James Davis Porter, serving under U.S. Secretary of State Thomas F. Bayard. Rives' term as Assistant Secretary of State ended in 1889 after Cleveland's defeat by Benjamin Harrison during the 1888 presidential election. Rives was succeeded by Boston lawyer William F. Wharton who served under Secretary James G. Blaine.

Following his service in the State Department, he joined the firm of Ohr, Rives & Montgomery. From 1896 until 1902, he was a member of the New York Rapid Transit Commission and in 1900, he was president of the Commission during its revision of the Greater New York Charter.

From 1902 to 1903, during the administration of New York City Mayor Seth Low, Rives was Corporation Counsel of New York City.

In 1913, he wrote and published the two volume book The United States and Mexico, 1821-1848: A History of the Relations between the Two Countries from the Independence of Mexico to the Close of the War with the United States.

=== Philanthropy ===
From 1882 until 1917, Rives was a trustee of his alma mater, Columbia University. From 1903 to 1917, he succeeded William C. Schermerhorn and served as chairman of the trustees. In 1917, he resigned as trustee and was awarded an honorary Doctor of Laws degree.

Rives also served as president of the New York Public Library, and chairman of the Trustees of the New York Hospital.

== Personal life ==
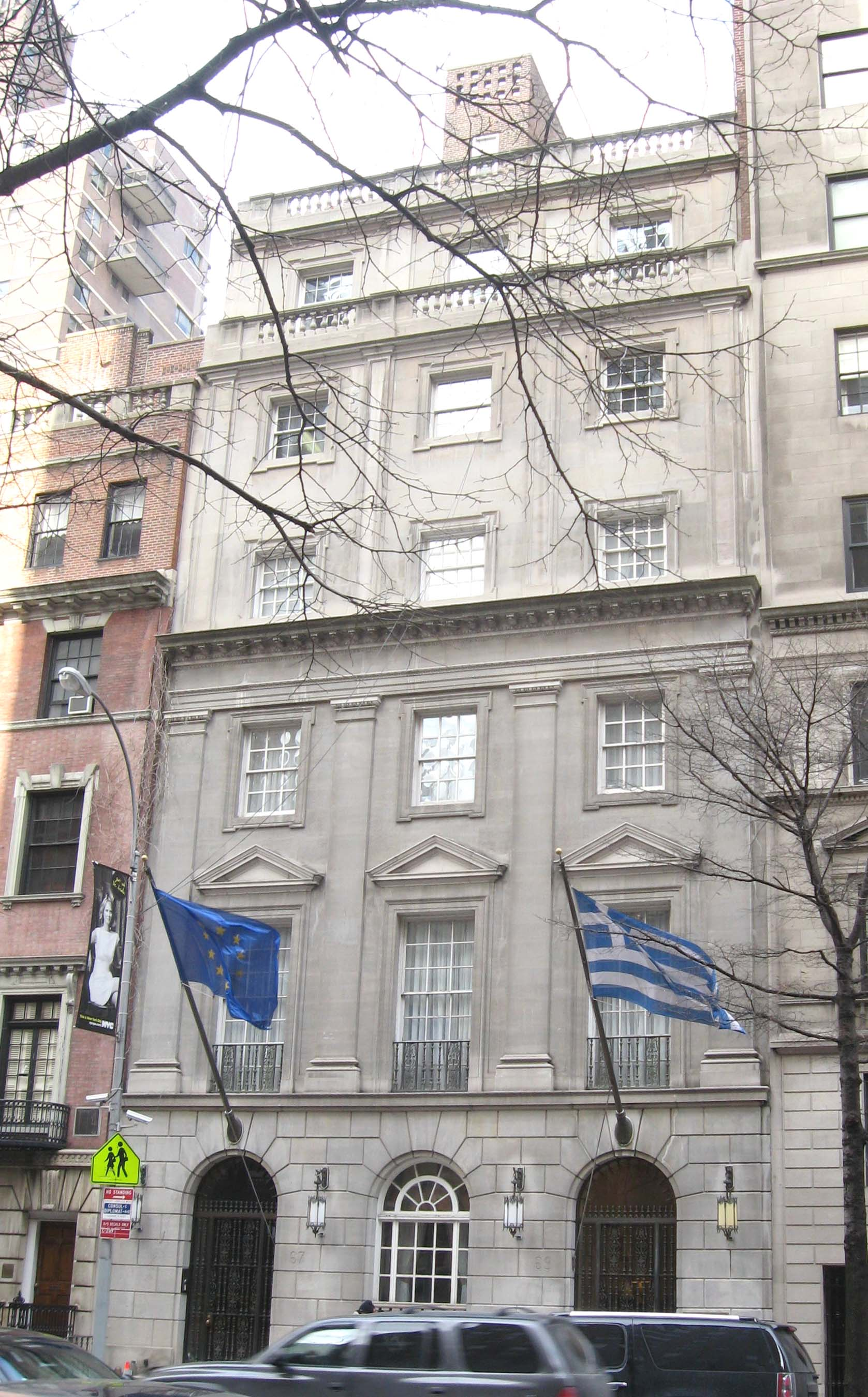
Former home of George L. Rives at 69 East 79th Street, Manhattan, today the Greek Consulate General

On May 21, 1873, Rives was married to Caroline Morris Kean (1849–1887). Caroline, daughter of Col. John Kean, granddaughter of Peter Philip James Kean, and great-granddaughter of Continental Congressman John Kean, was the sister of U.S. Senators John Kean and Hamilton Fish Kean.

- George Barclay Rives (1875–1935), a graduate of St. Paul's School and Princeton University who worked in the U.S. Diplomatic Service as the first secretary of the American Embassy in Vienna, Chargé d'affaires in Brazil, and special assistant to U.S. Ambassador James W. Gerard in Berlin during World War I. George was married to Gisela Antonia Preinerstorfer (1882–1953).

After his first wife's death, Rives married for the second time to Sarah Swan (née Whiting) Belmont (1861–1924), the daughter of Augustus L. Whiting and Sarah (née Swan) Whiting, on March 20, 1889. From her first marriage to banker and socialite Oliver Belmont, (Note: Oliver Hazard Perry Belmont (1858–1908) was the son of banker August Belmont and Caroline (née Perry) Belmont, the grandson of Commodore Matthew Perry, and the brother of Perry Belmont and August Belmont, Jr. After his divorce from Sarah, he married Alva Erskine Smith Vanderbilt (the former wife of William K. Vanderbilt and mother of Consuelo Vanderbilt, who married Charles Spencer-Churchill, 9th Duke of Marlborough, William Kissam Vanderbilt II, and Harold Stirling Vanderbilt) and became a member of Congress representing New York.) she was the mother of Natica Caroline Belmont (1883–1908). After George's marriage to Sarah, he adopted Natica who took the surname Rives. In 1907, she married William Burden, brother of Arthur Scott Burden and James A. Burden Jr., though she died of asphyxiation in 1908, a few months after the marriage. Together, George and Sarah were the parents of two additional children:

- Francis Bayard Rives (1890–1969), who married Helen Leigh Hunt (1893–1996), daughter of real estate investor Leigh S. J. Hunt and sister of Henry Leigh Hunt, who was married to Louise Lévêque de Vilmorin.
- Mildred Sara Rives (1893–1927), who married architect Frederick Marquand Godwin (1889–1961) of Cedarmere in Roslyn, New York, in 1917. Frederick was a cousin of Professor Allan Marquand. Mildred died in December 1927 giving birth to their only child, Peter Bryant Godwin, who also died during birth.

The Riveses had a city residence at 69 East 79th Street in Manhattan designed by Carrère and Hastings in 1907–1908; a summer home in Newport, Rhode Island; and a country home in Tuxedo Park, New York. His portrait was painted in 1915 by the Swiss-born American artist Adolfo Müller-Ury (1862–1947) and hangs in the University; another version by the artist belonged to the sitter's family.

Rives died at his summer home in Newport on August 18, 1917. His widow died at her residence, 907 Fifth Avenue in New York, on May 29, 1924.
