= William Cabell Rives =

American politician (1793–1868)

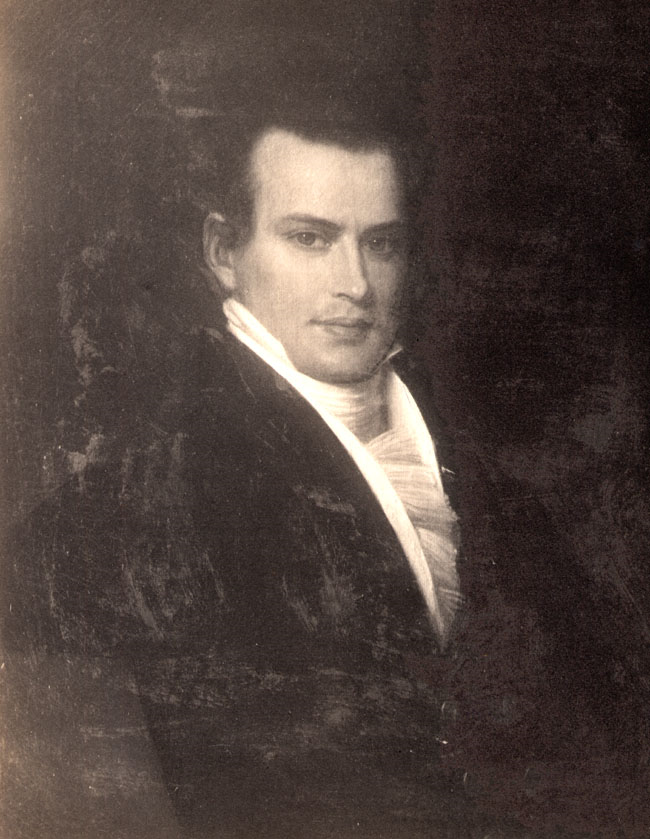

Member of the Confederate Congress from Virginia's 7th district
- In office May 2, 1864 – March 2, 1865
- Preceded by: James Philemon Holcombe
- Succeeded by: Position abolished

Delegate from Virginia to the Provisional Confederate Congress
- In office February 4, 1861 – February 17, 1862
- Preceded by: Position established
- Succeeded by: Position abolished

13th and 18th United States Minister to France
- In office 1849–1853
- Appointed by: Zachary Taylor
- Preceded by: Richard Rush
- Succeeded by: John Y. Mason
- In office 1829–1833
- Appointed by: Andrew Jackson
- Preceded by: James Brown
- Succeeded by: Levett Harris

United States Senator from Virginia
- In office January 18, 1841 – March 3, 1845
- Preceded by: Himself
- Succeeded by: Isaac S. Pennybacker
- In office March 4, 1836 – March 3, 1839
- Preceded by: John Tyler Jr.
- Succeeded by: Himself
- In office December 10, 1832 – February 22, 1834
- Preceded by: Littleton W. Tazewell
- Succeeded by: Benjamin W. Leigh

Member of the U.S. House of Representatives from Virginia's 10th district
- In office March 4, 1823 – 1829
- Preceded by: Thomas L. Moore
- Succeeded by: William F. Gordon

Member of the Virginia House of Delegates from Albemarle County
- In office 1822-23 Serving with William F. Gordon
- Preceded by: Charles Cocke
- Succeeded by: Thomas Mann Randolph

Member of the Virginia House of Delegates from Nelson County
- In office 1817–1820 Serving with Thomas McCleland, John P. Cobbs and Joseph Shelton
- Preceded by: Joseph Shelton
- Succeeded by: John P. Cobbs

Personal details
- Born: May 4, 1793 Amherst County, Virginia, U.S.
- Died: April 25, 1868 (aged 74) Charlottesville, Virginia, U.S.
- Party: Democratic, Whig

William Cabell Rives (May 4, 1793 – April 25, 1868) was an American lawyer, planter, politician and diplomat from Virginia. Initially a Jackson Democrat as well as member of the First Families of Virginia, Rives served in the Virginia House of Delegates representing first Nelson County, then Albemarle County, Virginia, before service in both the U.S. House and Senate (his final term as a Whig). Rives also served two separate terms as U.S. Minister to France. During the Andrew Jackson administration, Rives negotiated a treaty whereby the French agreed to pay the U.S. for spoliation claims from the Napoleonic Wars. During the American Civil War, Rives became a Delegate to the Provisional Confederate Congress and the Confederate House of Representatives.

== Early life and education ==
Rives was born at "Union Hill", the James River plantation estate of his grandfather, Col. William Cabell, in what was then Amherst County, Virginia and is now Nelson County. His parents were Robert Rives (1764–1845) and the former Margaret Cabell (c. 1770–1815). Robert Rives of Sussex County had served in the patriot army during the final Yorktown campaign, then became a commission merchant (first operating as Robert Rives and Company and later as Brown, Rives and Company), with Thomas Jefferson as one of his clients. He built a plantation, Oak Ridge Plantation, in Nelson County in 1802, where he would bury his wife, and later be buried. On his death in 1845, the personal estate of Rives Sr. would be valued at $100,000 (~$3.19 million in 2024) and included lands in Albemarle, Buckingham, Campbell and Nelson Counties. Three of their sons, including William C. Rives would serve as legislators. Others included Robert Rives Jr. (1798–1869) and future Virginia Court of Appeals and U.S. District Judge Alexander Rives. His distant nephew Alexander Brown wrote books about the early history of Virginia as well as The Cabells and their Kin.

After private tutoring appropriate to his station, W. C. Rives attended Hampden-Sydney College, followed by the College of William & Mary in Williamsburg. He then studied law with Thomas Jefferson at Monticello in nearer home.

During the War of 1812, he joined the local militia, which defended the Commonwealth.

== Personal life ==
In 1819, Rives married Judith Page Walker (1802–1882), the daughter of Francis Walker, and likewise of the First Families of Virginia. Their eldest son, Francis Robert Rives (1821–1891) followed his father's path into the law and diplomacy, but after returning from his foreign service in 1845, married Thomas Henry Barclay's granddaughter, Matilda Antonia Barclay and lived in Manhattan as well as Dutchess County, New York, with his firstborn son George Lockhart Rives (1849–1917) following family tradition by becoming a lawyer and diplomat (but not owning slaves). This Rives' second son, William C. Rives Jr. (1826–1890), likewise began a legal career and also operated Virginia plantations using enslaved labor. The junior Rives owned the still-standing Cobham Park Estate near Charlottesville, and his son, also William Cabell Rives (1850–1938) donated the Peace Cross and supported building the Washington National Cathedral. The youngest son, Alfred Landon Rives, became a prominent engineer (working on the U.S. Capitol and later for railroads), and his granddaughter Amélie Rives became a novelist, best known for The Quick or the Dead? (1888). The Rives also had daughters Grace Rives (1822–), Amelia Rives Sigourney (1832–1873) and Emma Rives (1835–1892).

== Early career ==
In 1814, Rives was admitted to the bar at Richmond. He began his law practice in Nelson County, but after his marriage moved to her estate Castle Hill, near Cobham in Albemarle County. This remained his primary residence for the rest of his life.

Like his father and other family members, Rives operated his plantations using enslaved labor. In the 1830 federal census, he owned 26 enslaved men and 26 enslaved women in Albemarle County. In the 1850 federal census, he owned 54 slaves in Albemarle County. A decade later, Rives owned 68 slaves and his son William C. Rives Jr. owned 24 slaves in Albemarle County. His brother or nephew Robert Rives Jr. owned 43 slaves in Albemarle County in 1850. and 70 slaves a decade later.

== Political career ==
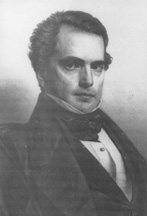
William Cabell Rives

Rives' political career began by as one of Nelson County's delegates in the state constitutional convention of 1816. Rives then won election and re-election as one of Nelson County's delegates (part time) in the Virginia House of Delegates (serving 1817–19), then won election as one of Albemarle County's delegates in 1822. During that session, his younger brother Robert Rives Jr., also served, as one of the Nelson County delegates.

Rives did not seek re-election to the Virginia legislature because in November 1822, voters in Virginia's 10th congressional district (which included both counties) elected him to represent them in the United States House of Representatives. He also won re-election and served from 1823 to 1829. In 1829 President Andrew Jackson nominated Rives to become Minister to France.

When Rives took office, compensation demands for captured American ships and sailors, dating from the Napoleonic era, caused strained relations between the American and French governments. The French Navy had captured and sent American ships to Spanish ports while holding their crews captive, thus forcing them to labor without any charges or judicial rules. Secretary of State Martin Van Buren, considered relations between the U.S. and France "hopeless." Yet, Rives was able to convince the French government to sign a reparations treaty on July 4, 1831, that would award the U.S. ₣ 25,000,000 ($5,000,000) in damages. However, the French government fell behind in its payments due to internal financial and political difficulties, but after firm insistence from the United States, payments were finally made in February 1836.

Rives was presented as a candidate for the Democratic vice presidential nomination in 1835, but the nomination went to Richard M. Johnson, in spite of having been presidential nominee Martin Van Buren's preferred candidate.

After Rives returned from France, Virginia legislators elected (and twice re-elected) him to the United States Senate. He replaced conservative Littleton Tazewell. In 1834, Rives resigned because he disagreed the proposed senatorial censure of President Jackson's removal of government deposits from the Bank of the United States. However, the next legislature again elected Rives as Senator, this time to replace John Tyler (thus he did not succeed himself). During his third term, Rives had become a member of the Whig Party and voted to expunge record of the censure from Senate records.

Rives also served on the Board of Visitors for the University of Virginia from 1834 to 1849, and for many years as president of the Virginia Historical Society.

In 1849, Rives once again accepted an appointment (and the Senate confirmed him) as Minister to France. He served until 1853, when he returned to his Virginia plantations. In 1831, Rives was elected as a member of the American Philosophical Society.

== Later life and American Civil War ==
Rives published several books and pamphlets, including the Life and Character of John Hampden (1845), Ethics of Christianity (1855) and Life and Times of James Madison (4 vols., Boston, 1859–68). His wife also published several volumes: The Canary Bird (1835), Epitome of the Holy Bible (1846), Tales and Souvenirs of a Residence in Europe (1842), Home and the World (1857),

In 1860, Rives endorsed the call for a Constitutional Union Party Convention. He received most of Virginia's first ballot votes for president. Rives then became one of Virginia's unofficial delegates to the February 1861 Peace Conference in Washington, which sought to prevent the American Civil War by preserving slavery. Although Rives spoke out against secession, he was loyal to Virginia when it seceded. He served in the Provisional Confederate Congress from 1861 to 1862 and the Second Confederate Congress from 1864 to 1865.

== Death and legacy ==
Rives died at Castle Hill in 1868 and was buried in the family cemetery at Castle Hill. Rives is the namesake of the town of Rivesville, West Virginia.

== See also ==
- Rives, Barclay (2014). William Cabell Rives : a country to serve. New York, New York: Atelerix. ISBN 978-0-9899263-2-4. OCLC 878972025.
- Latner, Richard B. (2002). "Andrew Jackson". In Graff, Henry (ed.). The Presidents: A Reference History (7th ed.).
- McCoy, Drew R. The Last of the Fathers: James Madison and the Republican Legacy. Cambridge, MA: Cambridge University Press, 1989, pp. 323–369.

U.S. House of Representatives
Preceded by Thomas L. Moore	Member of the U.S. House of Representatives from Virginia's 10th congressional district 1823–1829	Succeeded by William F. Gordon
U.S. Senate
Preceded by Littleton W. Tazewell	U.S. senator (Class 2) from Virginia; 1832–1834; Served alongside: John Tyler Jr.	Succeeded by Benjamin W. Leigh
Preceded by John Tyler Jr.	U.S. senator (Class 1) from Virginia; 1836–1839; Served alongside: Richard E. Parker, William H. Roane	Succeeded by Himself
Preceded by Himself	U.S. senator (Class 1) from Virginia; 1841–1845; Served alongside: William S. Archer	Succeeded by Isaac S. Pennybacker
Political offices
Preceded by New creation	Delegate to the Provisional Confederate Congress from Virginia; April 29, 1861 – February 16, 1862	Succeeded by Office abolished
Confederate States House of Representatives
Preceded by James P. Holcombe	Member of the C.S. House of Representatives from Virginia's 7th congressional district February 17, 1864 – March 7, 1865	Succeeded by Office abolished
Diplomatic posts
Preceded by James Brown	Minister to France; Mid-1829–1832	Succeeded by Edward Livingston
Preceded by Richard Rush	Minister to France; 1849–1853	Succeeded by John Y. Mason
