= William Wharton =

William Wharton may refer to:

- William H. Wharton (1802–1839), American colonist, political leader, diplomat, Senator and orator
- William Wharton (Royal Navy officer) (1843–1905), British admiral and Hydrographer of the Navy 1884-1904
- William F. Wharton (1847–1919), American attorney who served as the United States Assistant Secretary of State
- William Wharton (author) (1925–2008), American author, pen name of Albert William Du Aime
- William P. Wharton (1880–1976), president of the National Parks Association 1935-53
- William Wharton, the villain from the novel The Green Mile by Stephen King and the 1999 movie of the same name
