= William Cabell (American Revolution) =

American politician (1730–1798)

Member of the Virginia House of Burgesses representing Albemarle County
- In office 1756–1761 Serving with John Nicholas, Allen Howard
- Preceded by: Peter Jefferson
- Succeeded by: John Fry

Member of the Virginia House of Burgesses representing Amherst County
- In office 1761–1776 Serving with Cornelius Thomas, Joseph Cabell
- Preceded by: n/a
- Succeeded by: Joseph Cabell

Member of the Virginia Senate representing Albemarle, Amherst and Buckingham Counties
- In office October 7, 1776 – May 3, 1778
- Preceded by: n/a

Member of the Virginia Senate representing Albemarle, Amherst, Fluvanna and Buckingham Counties
- In office May 4, 1778 – May 1782
- Preceded by: n/a
- Succeeded by: Joseph Cabell

Member of the Virginia House of Delegates representing Amherst County
- In office May 1782 – May 2, 1784 Serving with Hugh Rose, Nicholas Cabell
- Preceded by: Nicholas Cabell
- Succeeded by: Nicholas Cabell
- In office October 15, 1787 – October 17, 1790 Serving with Samuel J. Cabell
- Preceded by: Hugh Rose
- Succeeded by: Hugh Rose
- In office October 21, 1793 – December 3, 1797 Serving with William Warwick, Joseph Burruss
- Preceded by: Samuel J. Cabell
- Succeeded by: Joseph Shelton

Personal details
- Born: March 13, 1730 Goochland County, Colony of Virginia, British America
- Died: March 23, 1798 (aged 68)
- Profession: Planter, politician

William Cabell (March 13, 1730 – March 23, 1798) was an American planter, soldier, and politician who served more than four decades in both houses of the Virginia General Assembly representing the area of his and family members' plantations on the upper James River.

== Early life, family and education ==
Cabell was born on March 13, 1730, near Licking Hole Creek in what was then vast Goochland County, Virginia. The firstborn son of physician, planter and surveyor William Cabell (1699–1774), who had emigrated from Warminister, England, and his wife the former Elizabeth Burks (1705–1756), he would have younger brothers Joseph Cabell (1730–1798), John Cabell (1735–1815) and Nicholas Cabell (1750–1803), and a sister Mary. All the Cabell brothers (and Mary's husband John Horsley) became patriots in the American Revolutionary War shortly after their father's death, and married well (thus making their family one of the First Families of Virginia), as they operated plantations using enslaved labor, and served in the Virginia General Assembly and local governments.

Cabell's father returned to England for several years to settle his father's estate, during which time he often wrote his wife about the boy's education. Elizabeth Burks Cabell ran her family's estates and greatly increased them during this time (including by buying slaves). According to family tradition, after receiving a private education suitable to his class from his parents and tutors at home, this William Cabell studied at the College of William and Mary in Williamsburg. At some point the college acknowledged his qualifications as surveyor, so by 1749, he was assisting in his father's surveying business. His public career would begin in 1751 as he joined his father as a vestryman of St. Anne's Parish in Albemarle County, Virginia. Two years later he received an official appointment as surveyor in his own right. As settlement proceeded westward through Virginia's Piedmont, the Virginia General Assembly created Albemarle County from the western section of Goochland County in 1744, and would create Buckingham County from the southern part of Albemarle County and Amherst County from the western section in 1761. Joseph and John Cabell would represent Buckingham County for many terms and Nicholas Cabell (who inherited his father's last plantation, called "Liberty Hall") would represent Amherst County during many legislative sessions (although "Liberty Hall's address would become Nelson County when it was created from Amherst County).

This William Cabell married Margaret Jordan, daughter of future one-term Buckingham County Burgess Col. Samuel Jordan in 1756. Seven children survived their father. Their firstborn, Samuel Jordan Cabell, was born the year of their marriage and would like his father become a planter and politician, serving in the U.S. Congress as well as Virginia House of Delegates. His slightly younger brother Margaret Cabell bore William Cabell, Jr. (1759–1822), who also served in the Continental Army, married the daughter of Virginia judge Paul Carrington and succeeded his father at "Union Hill," most of which became part of Nelson County during that county's creation from parts of both Albemarle and Amherst counties in 1808. Their two other sons were Landon Cabell (1765–1834) and Hector Cabell (1768–1807), with Hector's widow marrying judge William Daniel and helping raise future justice William Daniel. Their three daughters all married well. Margaret married prominent Nelson County planter and merchant Robert Rives; their son William Cabell Rives would have a distinguished legal and diplomatic career. Paulina (1763–1845) married Maj. Edmund Read and after his death c. 1808 Rev. Nash LeGrand. Their youngest daughter Elizabeth (1774–1801) married her cousin William H. Cabell (1772–1853; Nicholas' son), who became governor of Virginia and, after her death, president of what later became the Virginia Supreme Court.

== Colonial planter, politician and military officer ==
In 1756, William Cabell won his first election and the following spring began what became a more than four decade long political career as a delegate in the House of Burgesses, representing first Albemarle County, then Amherst County following its creation by the legislature in 1761. Amherst County voters re-elected him as their (part-time) representative to successive assemblies until Lord Dunmore suppressed that legislative body just before the American Revolutionary War. In 1764, Cabell was one of the first subscribers to the James River Canal Company (although it would not be formally incorporated by the legislature until January 5, 1785), and in 1772 began the first of several terms as treasurer of Amherst County.

Cabell joined the Albemarle County militia in 1756 and two years later (with his father-in-law Samuel Jordan and John Nicholas) became a commissioner for inspecting the damage from the native American raids the previous year, as well as bills for provisions and militia service during the French and Indian War. Governor Francis Fauquier appointing Cabell militia Colonel for Albemarle County on October 11, 1760, and in the following two years the may have been granted 460 acres and 1243 acres in Brunswick County for that service.

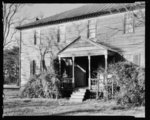
Union Hill plantation house, Warminster, Nelson County, Virginia

Between February 16, 1761, and May 2, 1763, Dr. Cabell began dividing his land (some received via royal letters patent in 1738) among his sons. He gave William Cabell 1,785 acres of his inheritance early (although he had been living on the acreage bounded by the Fluvanna River since 1752), and began establishing what would become his first and core plantation, "Union Hill". A decade earlier, in 1753, William Cabell had received his first land patent (claim) for 2700 acres on the east side of Tobacco Row Mountain, for which he paid the colony's government 12 pounds and 15 shillings in cash. In 1760, this William Cabell patented land on both sides of Findlay Creek adjoining the acreage he received from his father, and in 1764 he added another 579 acres—and would build a house and continue to add to the plantation for years.

Meanwhile, William Cabell also received appointments as the first presiding magistrate of Amherst County, first County lieutenant (chief military officer), first county surveyor (the most important office in a new frontier county), and as its first coroner, all of which legislative, executive and judicial offices he continued to hold until 1775. Thus, while he held all the county offices until 1775, the family historian speculates that many functions were performed by clerks or others under his supervision.

== Patriot ==
During the American Revolutionary War, William Cabell attended four of the five Virginia Conventions (his brother John Cabell, the sheriff of Buckingham County attended the fifth). His younger brother Nicholas Cabell led troops (including this William Cabell's sons William Jr. and Samuel Jordan) as well as served in the legislature, until assigned duties in southwestern Virginia, whereupon Samuel J. Cabell led the military company. Meanwhile, this William Cabell served on the Amherst County Committee of Safety during the revolutionary struggle, and would be the only Piedmont-area representative on the state Committee of Safety. As the presiding justice for Amherst County beginning in 1777, he in effect continued as the area's chief executive officer, in addition to performing judicial duties.

Following the creation of the Commonwealth of Virginia after defeating the British, voters in Albemarle, Amherst and Buckingham counties elected Cabell as their first state senator (and re-elected him in 1788 when Fluvanna County which had been created from part of Albemarle County in 1777 was added to the district).

In 1788 Amherst County voters overwhelmingly elected this William Cabell and his eldest son Samuel J. Cabell to represent them in the Virginia Ratification Convention (with 327 and 317 votes respectively, the next candidate receiving 23 votes), where both Cabells (like their ally Patrick Henry) voted against the proposed United States Constitution, although the convention as a whole ratified it. William Cabell then became a member of the Virginia legislative committee that drew up the Declaration of Rights of January 7, 1789. As one of his last political acts in his long career, William Cabell served as one of the presidential electors who voted for George Washington as the first President of the United States. He also served many terms as trustee of Hampden–Sydney College, where his sons studied.

== Death and legacy ==
William Cabell Sr. died in 1798 and was buried at Union Hill Cemetery in Winginia, Nelson County. By the time of his death, he had distributed estates to various family members, who received an additional 30,000 acres in his will. His eldest son, Samuel J. Cabell, was by then representing the area in the U.S. Congress. Many Cabell family papers are held by the University of Virginia libraries, including this man's journals and a 1996 monograph about newly discovered correspondence between his parents during his childhood. However, most of the Union Hill outbuildings were deteriorated by 1898, and much of the property left family hands in 1969 when sold to a Richmond development company. The Union Hill house was moved onto 1551 Carriage Lane in Goochland County circa 1980, although the Cabell Foundation continues to hold and maintain the historic Cabell family cemetery.
