= Alfred L. Rives =

American engineer and railroad executive (1830–1903)

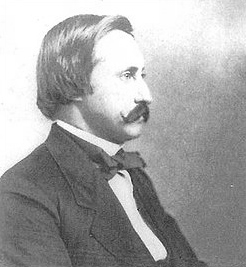
Rives, likely in the 1850s or 1860s

Alfred Landon Rives (March 25, 1830, Paris, France – February 27, 1903, Castle Hill, Virginia) was an American engineer. He worked on various railroads, bridges, buildings and canals in Northern and Central America. He also served as a Confederate States Army officer during the American Civil War.

== Life ==
Alfred Rives was the son of William Cabell Rives and Judith (Walker) Rives. His father, who was among the most distinguished citizens of Virginia, was the United States Minister to France; based in Paris where Alfred was born in 1830. The elder Rives would serve as a United States Senator before being posted on the same position again in 1848.

Rives was taught by private tutors until fourteen years of age, then became a student of Concord Academy. At the age of sixteen he became a cadet at the Virginia Military Institute and graduated two years later in 1848, ranking sixth in a class of twenty-four.

Being proficient in engineering, he determined to adopt that as a profession, and in the same year entered the University of Virginia, where he remained one session, then accompanied his father to France. After a year devoted to the study of mathematics and French, he successfully passed an examination for entrance in the Government Engineering School of France, the Ecole des ponts et Chaussees. After graduation in 1854, he was offered a position in the French Northern Railway Company but instead returned to the United States, where he served in the engineering corps of the Virginia Midland Railway.

Later Rives accepted a civil engineering position in Washington D.C., teaming with Captain Montgomery C. Meigs of the United States Corps of Engineers. There he served a year as Assistant Engineer for the United States Capitol and various Post Office buildings. He was appointed engineer-in-charge in the Department of the Interior under President Franklin Pierce, to report upon the best location for a bridge across the Potomac River. He presented details and estimates for the project in the 1857 "Congressional records". The report was favorably received, and Rives was selected to make calculations and estimates for this Cabin John bridge, which was built under his supervision.

He returned to Virginia, his native state, upon its secession from the Union. Three days later he received the commission of captain of engineers from the state of Virginia, and was directed to report to Colonel Andrew Talcott, at that time chief engineer of the state. Rives was assigned to duty on the lower Virginia Peninsula, and upon the resignation of Colonel Talcott was soon made acting chief engineer of the state of Virginia.

When the Engineer Bureau of the Confederate States of America was established in 1861, Rives was named Assistant Chief Engineer. He frequently served as Acting Chief Engineer, basically leading the bureau from late 1861 to mid 1864. Throughout the war the Confederate States Army officer was successively promoted to major, lieutenant-colonel and eventually colonel of engineers. Meanwhile his father served in the Confederate States Congress.

After the war he was offered a professorship in several institutions of learning, and also a good architectural position under the United States government. He declined all of those, preferring to stay in Richmond and try to recover his fortunes as an engineer and architect. In 1868 he was division engineer of the Chesapeake and Ohio Railroad. In 1870 he was appointed chief engineer of the Mobile & Birmingham railroad. He was engineer in charge of the South & North Alabama railroad and part of the Louisville & Nashville system, which he completed in 1873. He was offered by Gen. William T. Sherman, for the Khedive of Egypt, the position of chief engineer of the civil works of Egypt, which position he declined to accept and of chief engineer and general superintendent of the Mobile & Ohio railroad.

In 1883, Rives became vice-president and general manager of the Richmond and Danville Railroad, now a part of the Southern Railway System. In 1886, was appointed a member of the United States commissioned to inspect and receive on the part of the government forty miles of the Northern Pacific Railroad in the state of Washington, and the following year became general superintendent of the Panama Railroad, and while with that railroad went to Paris, and concluded a traffic agreement with the Canal Company. He presented to the canal commission a plan for the completion of the Panama Canal, in which he had always taken a great interest. In 1894, he communicated to the director of the canal a plan for the construction of a part at La Boca in the vicinity of Panama, which if constructed would tend greatly to facilitate and increase the traffic across the isthmus.

After resigning his position with the Panama Railroad, he was made chief engineer of the Cape Cod Canal. He then was charged with the construction of the Vera Cruz and Pacific Railroad in Mexico, being named its vice president.

He died at Castle Hill on February 27, 1903. His papers are held at Duke University.

== Family ==
Rives married Sadie MacMurdo, with whom he had three children: Amelia, who became a well-known author and wife of Prince Trubetskoy; Gertrude, the wife of Allen Potts, Esq.; and Miss Landon Rives.
