= Cobham Park (Virginia) =

Historic house in Virginia, United States

- U.S. National Register of Historic Places
- Virginia Landmarks Register
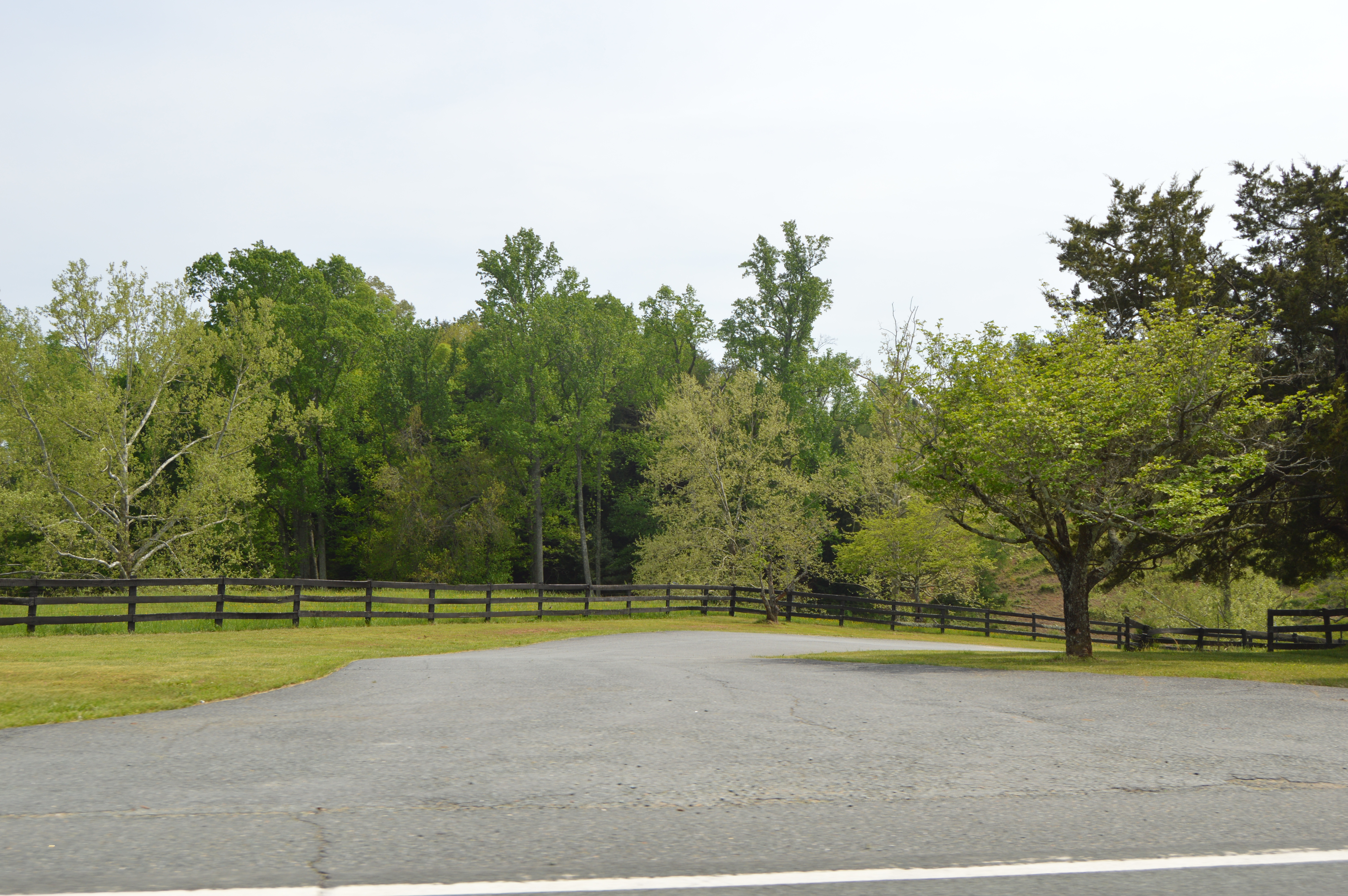
- Entrance to the estate

- Location within Virginia Location within the United States
- Location: South of VA 22, near Cobham, Virginia
- Coordinates: 38°3′34″N 78°15′46″W
- Area: 692.5 acres (280.2 ha)
- Built: 1856
- Built by: McSparren
- Architectural style: Georgian
- NRHP reference No.: 74002101
- VLR No.: 002-0153

Significant dates
- Added to NRHP: July 18, 1974
- Designated VLR: January 15, 1974

Cobham Park, or Cobham Park Estate, is a historic estate located near Cobham, in Albemarle County and Louisa County, Virginia. The mansion was built in 1856, and is a rectangular 2 1/2-story, five-bay, double-pile structure covered by a hipped roof with three hipped roof dormers on each of the main slopes, and one dormer on each end. The house is an unusual example of ante-bellum period Georgian style architecture. It features front and rear, simple Doric order porches supported on square Ionic order columns. Also on the property are: two smokehouses, one brick and one frame, a frame dependency, and a simple two-story frame dwelling. It was the summer home of William Cabell Rives, Jr., (1825-1890), second son of the noted United States senator and minister to France William Cabell Rives.

It was added to the National Register of Historic Places in 1974.
