= Samuel Jordan Cabell =

American politician

Member of the U.S. House of Representatives from Virginia's 14th district
- In office March 4, 1795 – March 3, 1803
- Preceded by: Francis Walker
- Succeeded by: Matthew Clay

Member of the Virginia House of Delegates representing Amherst County
- In office October 17, 1785 – October 20, 1793 Serving with William Cabell Jr., Hugh Rose, Samuel Meredith
- Preceded by: Nicholas Cabell
- Succeeded by: William Cabell Jr.

Personal details
- Born: December 15, 1756 Albemarle County, Virginia Colony, British America
- Died: August 4, 1818 (aged 61) Wingina, Nelson County, Virginia, U.S.
- Party: Democratic-Republican

Samuel Jordan Cabell (December 15, 1756 – August 4, 1818) was an American Revolutionary War officer, planter and Virginia politician who served in the Virginia House of Delegates (from 1785 to 1793) and at the Virginia Ratification Convention of 1788 as an Anti-Federalist and in the United States House of Representatives aligned with the Democratic-Republican (from 1795 to 1803).

== Early life and education ==
Cabell was born in what was then Albemarle County in the Colony of Virginia, the son of prominent planter William Cabell and his wife. His grandfather, also William Cabell, had emigrated from Warminister, England to the new world, possibly after visiting the Virginia colony during his service with the Royal Navy as a ship's surgeon (although he had no medical degree, medical schools having been formed in the era). In addition to his medical practice, his grandfather became a local undersheriff in Henrico County, then surveyor and coroner slightly to the west upstream along the James River in Goochland County as he began operating plantations using enslaved labor, and kept moving westward in Virginia, finally dying at a plantation he left his youngest son (this man's uncle) in what ultimately became Nelson County. The Virginia General Assembly split Goochland County into Albemarle County in 1844, during his father's and grandfathers' lifetimes, and split Albemarle County several times during his childhood and early adulthood. Young Cabell received a private education suitable to his class, then was sent to the former capital at Williamsburg for higher studies at The College of William & Mary.

== Military service ==
The American Revolutionary War interrupted his studies, in part as the College of William & Mary closed during much of the conflict and troops occupied the campus. His father William Cabell was familiar with the college and Williamsburg through his service in the Virginia House of Burgessess, first representing Albemarle County and then Amherst County after its creation in 1760. The elder Cabells sided with patriots and against royal authority, which had led Lord Dunmore to suspend the legislature, after which William Cabell represented Amherst County at four of the five Virginia Conventions as the American Revolutionary War began. Samuel Cabell and his younger brother William Cabell Jr. joined the Revolutionary Army in 1775. The Cabell family recruited a company of riflemen, with his uncle Nicholas Cabell of the "Union Hills" plantation as their Colonel. However Nicholas Cabell was then appointed a commissioner to settle various claims in Virginia's "southern district" (Pittsylvania, Augusta, Botetourt and Bedford Counties). Thus, in 1776, the Amherst County Volunteers elected this Samuel Cabell captain and state officials assigned the unit to the 6th Virginia Regiment led by Col. Charles Lewis of Albemarle County and who marched with a group of Hanover County volunteers led by Col. Samuel Meredith and Patrick Henry to Gwynn Island to seize the powder previously commandeered by Lord Dunmore. Capt. Cabell participated in the Battle of Saratoga in 1777 and was promoted to the rank of major. He served in George Washington’s army in 1778–1779 and received a promotion to the rank of lieutenant colonel. However, at the Siege of Charleston on May 12, 1780, Col. Cabell was captured and in British custody at Haddock's Point until the war's end, returning home on August 21, 1781.

== Career ==
After the war, Cabell operated plantations using enslaved labor, as did his father, and also served (sometimes with his father) as a member of the Virginia House of Delegates from 1785 to 1792. In 1788 Amherst county voters elected Cabell and his father to represent them in the Virginia Ratification Convention, where both Cabells (like Patrick Henry) voted against the proposed United States Constitution, although the convention as a whole ratified it. Samuel Cabell then persuaded fellow Anti-Federalist and Continental Army veteran James Monroe to run against James Madison for the position of U.S. Representative for the extensive district that ran from Amherst County in southwest Virginia to Spotsylvania County in the Northeast, thus extending the future President's political experience. Meanwhile, Matthew Clay, a relative of future U.S. Senator Henry Clay succeeded to Cabell's congressional seat in the 1802 election, and his cousin William H. Cabell had succeeded Cabell's younger brother in the Virginia House of Delegates and began a career which would include service as Virginia's governor and presiding judge of what later would be called the Virginia Supreme Court.

== Death and legacy ==
Samuel Cabell died in 1818 on his estate Soldier's Joy at Wingina in Nelson County. Many of the family papers are held by the University of Virginia Library.

U.S. House of Representatives
Preceded by Francis Walker	Member of the U.S. House of Representatives from Virginia's 14th congressional district March 4, 1795 – March 3, 1803	Succeeded by Matthew Clay
