= Dr. Thomas Walker State Historic Site =

Park in Kentucky, United States

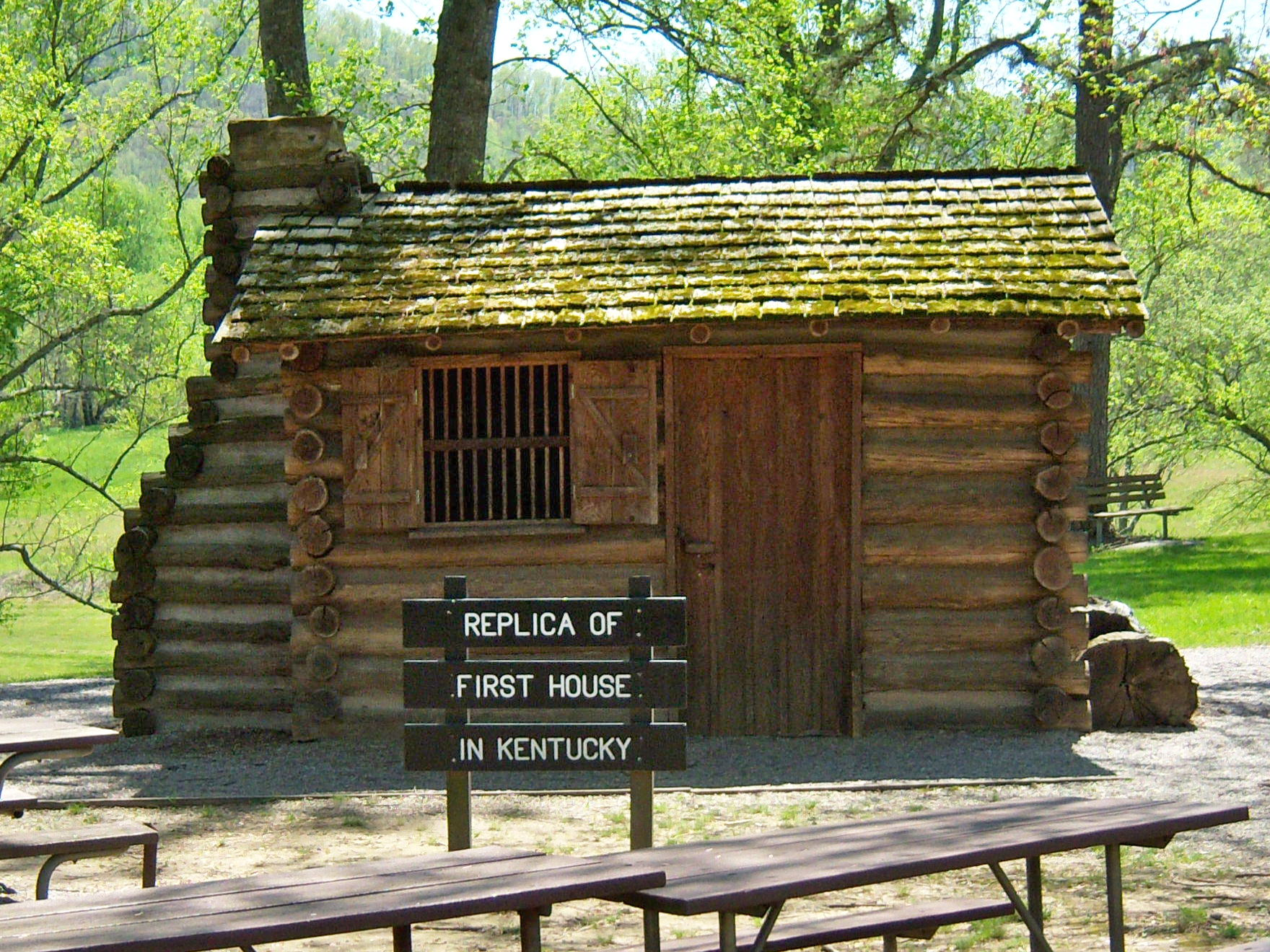
- Replica of Thomas Walker's cabin

- Location within Kentucky Location within the United States
- Location: Knox County, Kentucky, United States
- Coordinates: 36°50′21″N 83°55′09″W
- Area: 12 acres (4.9 ha)
- Established: 1931
- Administrator: Kentucky Department of Parks
- Website: Official website

Dr. Thomas Walker State Historic Site is a park located six miles southeast of Barbourville in Knox County in the U.S. state of Kentucky. The land was donated by the American Legion and the people of Barbourville, and marks the area where Kentucky pioneer Thomas Walker, a physician, built his cabin in 1750. A representative cabin marks the spot of "the first house in Kentucky". The site was dedicated in 1931. A replica of the cabin can be toured.
