= Francis Walker (Virginia politician) =

American politician

The Hon. Francis Walker
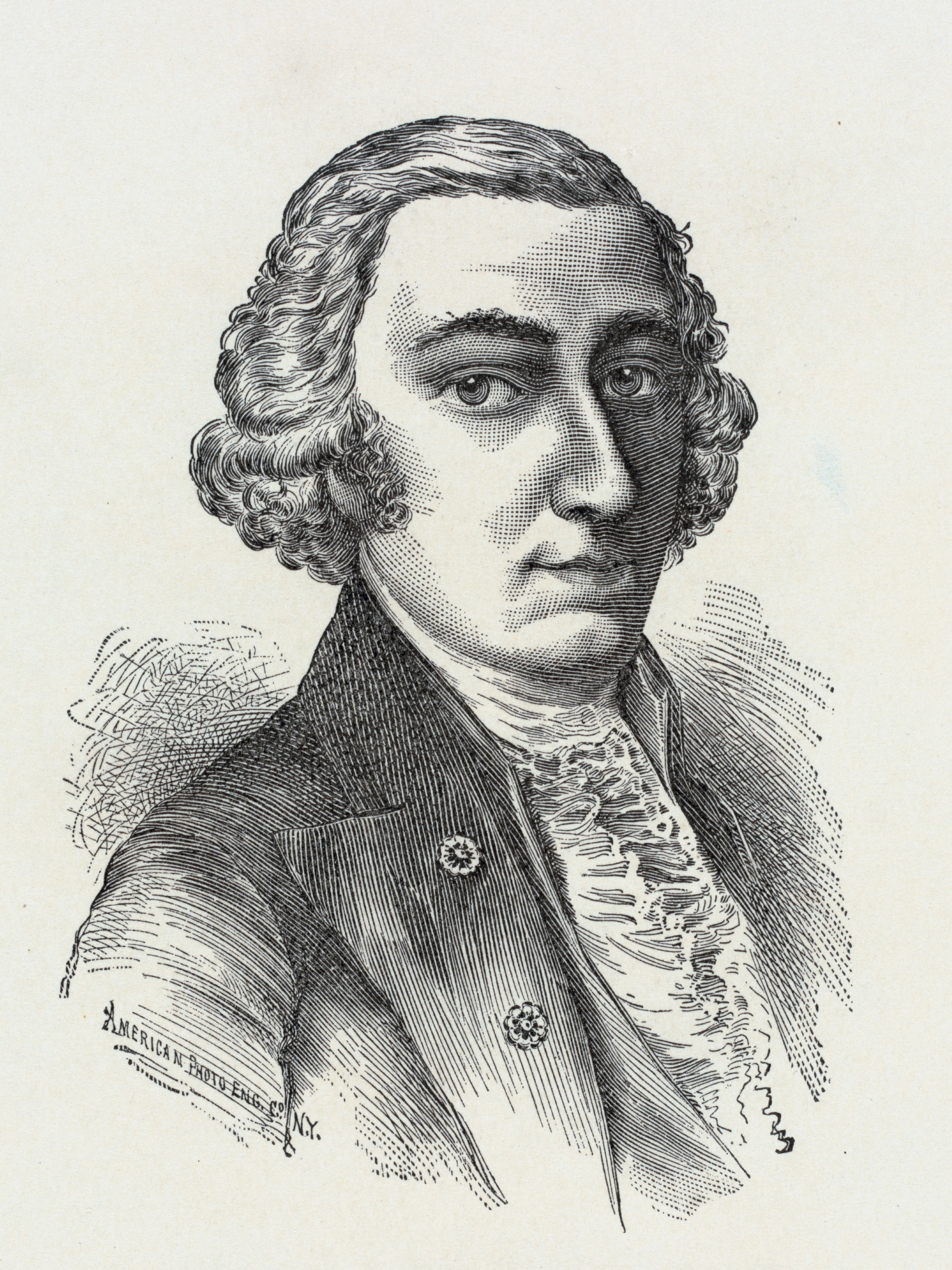
- Portrait of Francis Walker

Member of the Virginia House of Delegates from the Albemarle district
- In office 1788–1791
- In office 1797–1801

Member of the U.S. House of Representatives from Virginia's 14th district
- In office December 2, 1793 – March 3, 1795
- Preceded by: District created
- Succeeded by: Samuel J. Cabell

Personal details
- Born: June 06, 1764 Albemarle County, Virginia
- Died: March 1806 (age 41) Castle Hill
- Resting place: Castle Hill
- Party: Anti-Administration
- Spouse: Jane Byrd Nelson
- Children: Jane Walker, Judith Walker
- Parents: Thomas Walker; Mildred Walker
- Relatives: John Walker

Francis Walker (June 22, 1764 – March 1806) was an American planter and politician from Albemarle County, Virginia. He was member of the Virginia House of Delegates in 1788-91 and again in 1797–1801. He represented Virginia in the U.S. Congress from 1793 to 1795.

== Biography ==
Francis was the second son, and one of twelve children of Dr. Thomas (1715–1794) and Mildred Walker. His mother was the widow of Nicholas Meriwether and through her he inherited the estate at Castle Hill in Albemarle County. His older brother John represented Virginia in the Continental Congress and the U.S. Senate.

Francis married Jane Byrd Nelson, daughter of General Hugh Nelson, and granddaughter William Nelson who had been President of the council and acting governor of Colonial Virginia. They had two daughters: Jane and Judith. Judith married William C. Rives who was later a U.S. Senator for Virginia.

Besides his state and federal service, Walker was a judge in Albemarle County, and Colonel of the county's militia. He died at home in 1806 and was buried in a family plot on his estate of Castle Hill.

Castle Hill (Virginia) still stands and is on the National Register of Historic Places. It is off Virginia Highway 231, north of Interstate 64 and northeast of the community of Cismont in Albemarle County. The property was sold in 2003 for 24 million (U.S. dollars). There is a roadside historic marker, but the estate itself is private property.

U.S. House of Representatives
Preceded by District created	Member of the U.S. House of Representatives from Virginia's 14th congressional district March 4, 1793 – March 3, 1795	Succeeded by Samuel J. Cabell
