= Anthony Aufrère =

English antiquary, barrister and translator

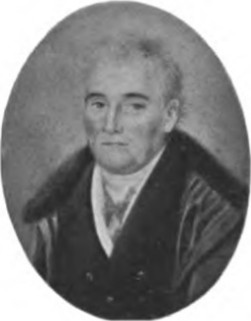
Portrait of Anthony Aufrère

Anthony Aufrère (30 November 1757 at Hoveton, Norfolk – 29 November 1833 in Pisa, Italy) was an English antiquary, barrister and translator.

== Early life ==
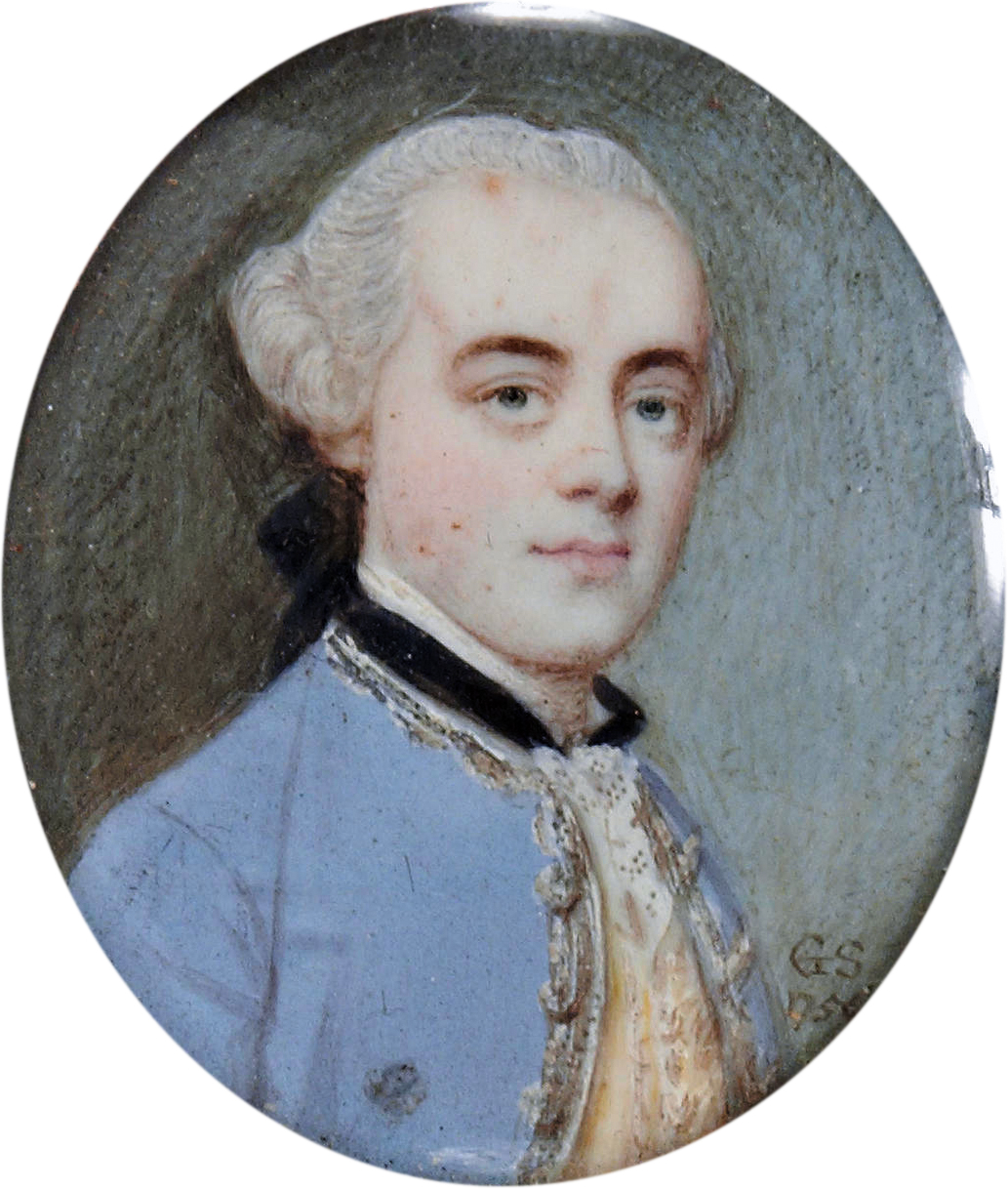
Anthony Aufrère Sr. (1730–1814) (Gervase Spencer, 1756). Aufrère's father.

Aufrère was the eldest son of Anthony Aufrère (1730–1814), of Hoveton Hall, Norfolk, a landowner and magistrate, from a very large family of fifteen children- seven sons and eight daughters. His mother was Anna Norris (1728–1816), only daughter of John Norris, of Witton, in the same county, and sister to John Norris, founder of the Norrisian professorship at Cambridge. The Aufrère family were of noble French lineage, and proud Protestant Huguenots who had left France on the revocation of the Edict of Nantes in 1685. As the eldest child, his parents had in mind a legal career for their son, and he was admitted to Gray's Inn in 1773 as a fifteen-year-old. Not much is known about his early life but he appears to have got into serious financial difficulties and his friend, the Reverend William Gunn (1750–1841), rector of Sloley, Norfolk, helped him out in 1781 with his debts. Aufrère was called to the Bar in February 1782. Details pertaining to Inn practice and if Aufrère was allowed chambers remains unclear. Three years later a friend of Gunn's wrote to him in 1785 "Anthony has given up the law and is now at Boulogne". In what appears to have been an attempt to flee his creditors, he went abroad. He met up with his friend Gunn in Pisa, Italy, who was on a Grand Tour, and they both continued to Florence. According to Riviere, Gunn's biographer, Aufrère later settled in Florence in 1785. The American royalist Thomas Hall (1750–1824), chaplain to the British factory at Leghorn (Livorno), also an antiquary, wrote to Gunn in October 1785 about "news of Aufrère who lives at Pisa". Riviere writes of "Aufrere's old lodgings by the centre bridge" presumably he lived in the Via Borgo Stretto by the Ponte di mezzo over the Arno river. This proximity would explain part of Aufrère's "Queries sent me by Mr. Gunn; with my answers (1786)", first published by Riviere in 1965, consisting of some 25 questions and answers on different Italian topics, ranging from the origin of the sham battle the Gioco del Ponte in Pisa to the Linnean name of the fish (Argentina Sphyrana) used in making false pearls at Rome. In January 1786 Aufrère travelled to Naples, and he said himself that he visited Rome for the first time in the winter of 1786, as he recalled seeing Charlotte Stuart, Duchess of Albany there. In 1787 it was reported that he was back in Florence, and in the same year he was also in Geneva, where he studied with the celebrated language teacher Monsieur de Rodon.

== Aufrere in Germany ==
Soon after he visited Germany, he settled down in Stuttgart and befriended Karl Friedrich Emich Freiherr von Uxküll=Gyllenband (1755–1832), gentleman of the chamber to the Duke of Wirtemberg. He was a renowned art connoisseur and a generous patron. We know that it was the Baron who originally showed Aufrère, Johann Gottfried Herder's essay on the great German humanist, knight, poet and pamphleteer, Ulrich von Hutten (1488–1523) that had been published in 1776 in Christoph Martin Wieland's journal Der Teutsche Merkur and that he suggested to him that he should translate it, as this is all mentioned in the translator's preface which is dated (Stuttgardt 10 June 1788).

title page of Aufrere's 1789 translation

We presume that it was also the Baron that had assured him that this anonymously printed essay was from the pen of Johann Wolfgang von Goethe. This false attribution was widely shared in Germany, and the error (that even Herder himself complained about as late as 1793), was still being made by German professors of literature in the 1840s. Aufrère is thus one of the earliest English translators of one of Herder's Sturm und Drang writings, albeit as a supposititious work. It is clear, however, from his preface, that he was proud to have translated this work:

"I trust that I am not deceived in my hopes and wishes, that this publication may prove grateful to the public, and may induce some to make farther enquiries into the particulars of the life of Hutten, and of his contemporaries, with which is interwoven a very interesting event in the history of mankind; nor can I help thinking that I am doing a pleasure to such as take delight in elegant and classic literature. Should I fail in my wishes in these respects, I still hope that my endeavours to make known in England the merits of a great and a virtuous man, will shelter me from censure, and that the defects in the execution will be pardoned in favour of the intention." [A Tribute to the Memory of Hutten (1789), Preface of the Translator, p.xi]

== Marriage in London, 1791 ==
Aufrère returned to England early 1791 and set about preparations for his marriage. At St George's, Hanover Square, in the fashionable London district of Mayfair, on 19 February he married Countess of the Empire, Marianne Matilda Lockhart (10 October 1774 – 14 September 1850), the only surviving daughter of General James Lockhart, of Lee and Carnwath in Lanarkshire, Scotland, who had been a general in the service of Empress Maria Theresa. The Empress had raised him to the dignity of a Baron of the Holy Roman Empire and had decorated him with military orders. In his later years he had been attached to the household of the Grand Duke of Tuscany, and Lockhart had died in Pisa on 6 February 1790. Aufrère and Marianne had almost certainly met in Pisa in 1785 as his friend William Gunn had already been introduced to father and daughter and, as he wrote somewhat begrudgingly, it was expected of him to spend the evenings at the houses of the three English families there. After the marriage the Aufrère family chose to live abroad in Heidelberg, Germany, possibly for financial reasons, and in the following year their daughter Louisa Anna Matilda (17 November 1792 – 1868) was also born there. There is a letter of Aufrère's to Gunn from Heidelberg dated 1 May 1793 but it is claimed that they had later moved to Mannheim, as his friend William Gunn and his family – returning from his second Grand Tour – met up with him there on 26 September, where they hired a barge and went sailing down the Rhine. In 1794 a son George Anthony (18 June 1794 – 6 May 1881) was born. There followed the publication of his Travels (1795) that has the translator's preface signed "Newton, near Chester, February, 1795." It was pitched in the newspaper classified ads as "a proper Supplement to Mr. Henry Swinburne's Travels in the Two Sicilies" so a work firmly belonging to that genre of the travel book influencing and encouraging the Grand Tour. In 1798 appeared his popular anti-revolutionary pamphlet A Warning to Briton's (1798) Aufrère also had in mind the translation of German work, and had written to his publishers Cadell & Davies in 1799: "As I hate to be idle I have some thoughts of employing my few leisure hours in a free translation & alteration of a German Novel, with additional portraits of some characters within the sphere of my own observations- & if I follow it up, as I now think I shall, I shall have it ready by next spring, & will send it you for perusal, & for publication if you think it will take." It appears that the novel was never published or finished.

== Imprisonment in France, 1802–1814 ==
According to the Genealogical Notes, compiled by George Lockhart Rives (1849–1917), but based on Aufrère's own MS, it says "He and his family went to France in 1802 and were among the English prisoners seized by Napoleon at the rupture of the Treaty of Amiens in May, 1803. They were in consequence forced to spend eleven years in France chiefly at Verdun and Avignon." John Henry Lawrence (1773–1840), a fellow dètenu who knew them both at Verdun and also moved to Orleans in July 1808, reported "Mr. and Mrs. Aufrère left Verdun in September, 1805, for Orleans, but generally resided in the neighbourhood, at the little town of Beaugency till July, 1808, when they received permission to remove at their option to Moulins, Lions, or Avignon." Lawrence gave a charming description of Mrs Aufrère confronting the commandant's wife, Madame la Generale Wirion at Verdun. While at Avignon Aufrère was involved with the distribution of 'charitable succours', as aid was then called, for two neighbouring depots of British prisoners of war.

== Return to Norfolk, 1814 ==
In the year of his release from imprisonment, his father died (11 September 1814) and, as eldest son, he inherited Hoveton Hall and the considerable estates. His mother died less than two years later (11 April 1816). According to Riviere it was Aufrère who got Humphry Repton (1752–1818), the architect and landscape gardener "to make some drawings for a new house there." "New" Hoveton Hall was built between 1809 and 1812. In 1817 he mortgaged 241 acres in Hoveton St. John to Robert Baker. In 1828 Aufrère sold the Hoveton estate to Christabell Burroughes as well as land allotted under the Hoveton Inclosure Bill after Aufrère's own petition to Parliament, where he is named: "Anthony Aufrere, Esquire, Lord of the Manor of Smallburgh". When he was in England he resided at Old Foulsham Hall, Norfolk, which is now a grade II listed building, which was previously the home of Major General Philip Skippon, Commander of Parliamentary Forces at the battle of Naseby.

== Last years in Italy ==
In his last years he was often to be found at the Italian spa resort, Bagni di Lucca, Tuscany, he even wrote a small article for the Gentleman's Magazine there. and there are letters full of antiquarian interest from Aufrère to Gunn at Milan (14 October 1830) and again at Pisa (5 November 1830) He died at Pisa on 29 November 1833, a day before his seventy-sixth year. He is buried at the Sepolture al vecchio Cimitero Inglese di Livorno (Via Verdi), the Old British cemetery of Leghorn, where the Scottish writer Tobias Smollett is also buried. In his last will & testament, in a last codicil written at Pisa 22 January 1833, Aufrère wrote "I desire to be interred in the English burial ground at Leghorn as near as possible to the Lockhart monuments..." He also stipulated his inscription on a plain monumental stone: "Anthony Aufrère Esquire of Foulsham Old Hall in the county of Norfolk upwards of 48 years in the Commission of the Peace for that county." His wife survived him seventeen years and died at Edinburgh, on 14 September 1850.

== Works ==
An obituary described Aufrère as "an excellent modern scholar, and a master of the Italian and French as well as German languages." As a translator, Aufrère published:

- A Tribute to the Memory of Ulric of Hutten, contemporary with Erasmus and Luther;One of the most zealous Antagonists, as well of the Papal Power as of all Despotic Government, and one of the most elegant Latin Authors of his Time; Translated from the German of Goethe, The celebrated author of the Sorrows of Werther : By Anthony Aufrère, Esq. Illustrated with remarks by the translator. With an appendix containing extracts from some of Hutten's performances, a list of his works, and other explanatory and interesting papers. London. Printed For J. Dodsley, Pall-Mall. (1789), in fact an English translation of the 1776 written essay by Johann Gottfried Herder.
- Travels through Various Provinces of the Kingdom of Naples, in 1789 (1795), from the German of Carl Ulisses von Salis-Marschlins
- A Warning to Britons against French Perfidy and Cruelty: Or, A short Account of the treacherous and inhuman Conduct of the French Officers and Soldiers towards the Peasants of Suabia, During the Invasion of Germany in 1796. Selected and translated from a well-authenticated German publication,... with an address to the people of Great Britain, by the translator, (1798) There was also 'An Abridgment of A Warning to Britons...' published the same year with pp. 24 instead of the original pp. 72.
- The Cannibals' progress; or The dreadful horrors of French invasion, as displayed by the Republican officers and soldiers, in their perfidy, rapacity, ferociousness and brutality, exercised towards the innocent inhabitants of Germany. Translated from the German. By Anthony Aufrer(sic), Esq. (Portsmouth: New-Hampshire, 1798) The popular American edition also had an "Introductory address. To the people of America." written by William Cobbett
- The Lockhart Papers; containing Memoirs and Commentaries upon the Affairs of Scotland, from 1702 to 1715, his Secret Correspondence with the- Son of James the Second, from 1718 to 1728, and his other Political Writings; also Journals and Memoirs of the Young Pretender's Expedition in 1745, by Highland Officers in his Army; published from original Manuscripts in the possession of Ant. Aufrère, Esq. of Hoveton, in Norfolk, 2 vols. 4to. (London, 1817.) Aufrere said that he was given the task by his brother-in-law, Charles Count Lockhart, of editing the Lockhart Letters for the purpose of publication "about three years before his death, which took place in August 1802" This would suggest 1799. The translation did not take place then for the following reasons:"but my avocations during that period, my journey to and detention of eleven years in France, and application to family arrangements upon my return to England in 1814, combined to delay their preparation for the press." It was eventually published in 1817 in two volumes. They contain much curious correspondence between the Lockharts and covert Jacobites, previous to and during the 1715 rebellion and 1745 rebellion. The delay in publication was deliberate, to avoid incriminating living persons.
- Narrative of an Expedition from Tripoli to the Western Frontier of Egypt, in 1817. By the Bey of Tripoli; in letters to Dr. Viviani of Genoa...with an appendix, containing instructions for navigating the Great Syrtis (1822), from the Italian of Paolo della Cella (1792–1854).

He was also a contributor to the Gentleman's Magazine, under the pseudonym of "Viator A."

== Family ==
Aufrère's own MS. of tracing his family beginning with Etienne Aufrère, President of the Parliament of Toulouse, at the close of the 15th Century is extant (Genealogical Notes, Of the Aufrère Family. pp. 50–61.); of his younger brothers the Rev. George John Aufrère (1769–1853) and the Rev. Philip DuVal Aufrère (1776–1848) were both educated at Norwich Grammar School and the University of Cambridge and were always destined for the clergy; his other brother, Charles Gastine Aufrère (1770–1799) a first lieutenant, died on board the frigate HMS Lutine, that was wrecked off the Dutch coast carrying a massive shipment of gold bullion. A further brother, Thomas Norris Aufrère (1773–1835) was a wealthy civil servant for the East India Company. Of his sisters, Sophia Aufrère (1763–1845) married William Dawson, Esq., of Holles-street, Cavendish-square. "Beautiful and ambitious, as well as something of a snob.... Sophia Dawson was often invited to play cards at Windsor Castle with King George III and Queen Charlotte, but she made it a rule never to play on a Sunday, even when invited by the King. Apparently he took no offence at this, but remarked to her: 'You are a good little woman, Mrs. Dawson.'" Harriet Aufrère (1765–1846) married Robert Baker, Barrister at law, and afterwards Knighted; Lady Baker died at the age of 80 years. Aufrere provided a list of her 13 children (Ibid., p. 59)

== Notes ==
Attribution

This article incorporates text from a publication now in the public domain: Stephen, Leslie, ed. (1885). "Aufrere, Anthony". Dictionary of National Biography. Vol. 2. London: Smith, Elder & Co.
