= John Walker (Virginia politician) =

American politician (1744–1809)

John Theodorus Walker
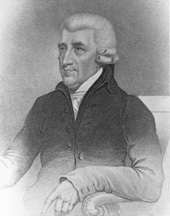

United States Senator from Virginia
- In office March 31, 1790 – November 9, 1790
- Appointed by: Beverley Randolph
- Preceded by: William Grayson
- Succeeded by: James Monroe

Delegate to the Second Continental Congress from Virginia
- In office 1780

Member of the Virginia House of Delegates from Albemarle County
- In office May, 1782 – December 28, 1782 Serving with Thomas Jefferson
- Preceded by: Thomas Walker
- Succeeded by: Position abolished

Member of the Virginia House of Burgesses from Albemarle County
- In office February 10, 1772 – November 29, 1776 Serving with Thomas Jefferson
- Preceded by: Thomas Walker
- Succeeded by: Position abolished

Personal details
- Born: February 13, 1744 Cobham, Albemarle County, Colony of Virginia
- Died: December 2, 1809 (aged 65) Madison Mills, Orange County, Virginia US
- Party: Pro-Administration
- Education: College of William & Mary
- Profession: Lawyer

John Theodorus Walker (February 13, 1744 – December 2, 1809) was a lawyer, planter, military officer and U.S. senator from Virginia.

== Early life ==
Walker was born in "Castle Hill" plantation in Albemarle County, Virginia, the son of Dr. Thomas Walker. He received private education before attending the College of William and Mary, from which he graduated in 1764. He was a neighbor and classmate at William and Mary of Thomas Jefferson, and they remained close friends until the elections of 1804-1805. In 1768, he was elected to the American Society.

== Military and political service ==
While still student at William & Mary or shortly after graduation, Walker accompanied his father to Fort Pitt to make a treaty with Native American tribes. In 1772, Albemarle County voters elected him to replace his father as a one of their representatives to the House of Burgesses, future governor and President Thomas Jefferson being the other part-time delegate; both were re-elected and served until that Governor Lord Dunmore suspended the body as the American Revolutionary War began. Walker also represented alongside Jefferson in the first four of the Virginia Revolutionary Conventions, with Charles Lewis also becoming a delegate in the Fourth Convention and replacing this man in the Fifth Convention as George Gilmer replaced Jefferson.

Unlike Jefferson, Walker served in the Continental Army, including in 1777 as an aide-de-camp to General George Washington, holding the rank of colonel.

In 1780, Virginia legislators elected Walker as a delegate to the Continental Congress. In 1782, Albemarle County voters elected him to his last term in the House of Delegates, where he again served alongside Jefferson.

At some point, Walker studied law, was admitted to the Virginia bar and served for many years as Commonwealth Attorney (prosecutor) for Albemarle County. When William Grayson died in 1790, Virginia's governor appointed Walker as his replacement in the United States Senate, where he served from March 31 to November 9 of that year, when fellow Revolutionary War veteran and future president James Monroe was elected by the Virginia General Assembly.

Walker was an elected member of the American Philosophical Society.

Walker owned several plantations, including "Belvoir" in Albemarle County, which he (like his father) operated using enslaved labor, which was not uncommon in this era. In the 1787 Virginia tax census, his father owned 37 slaves under 16 years old, 38 adult slaves, 25 horses and 81 cattle, as well as a four wheeled chariot, and this man owned 26 slaves under 16 years old, 21 adult slaves, 17 horses, 3 cattle and a four wheeled chariot

== Personal life ==
Walker married Elizabeth Moore, the daughter of Bernard Moore. They had a daughter Mildred, who married Francis Kinloch (1765-1826) who had graduated from Eton College and studied in Paris and Geneva before serving in the Revolutionary War and earning promotion to captain and serving many terms in the South Carolina House of Representatives as well as in the Continental Congress, the South Carolina ratification convention, and as warden of the city of Charleston

Thomas Jefferson's attempted seduction of this man's wife, which almost led to a duel, and was fodder for the Federalist Press.

== Death and legacy ==
Walker died in 1809.

U.S. Senate
Preceded by William Grayson	U.S. senator (Class 1) from Virginia; March 31, 1790 – November 9, 1790; Served alongside: Richard H. Lee	Succeeded by James Monroe
