= William F. Wharton =

American lawyer (1847–1919)

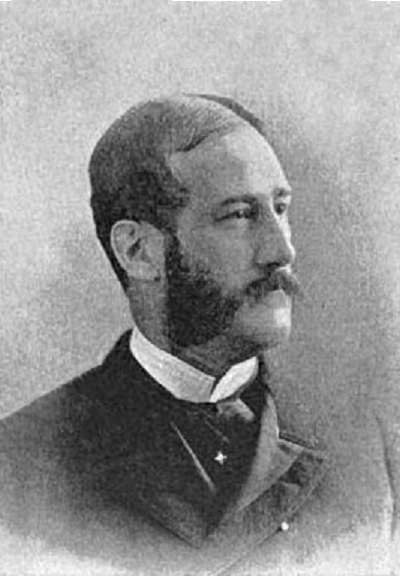

United States Assistant Secretary of State
- In office April 2, 1889 – March 20, 1893
- President: Benjamin Harrison; Grover Cleveland
- Preceded by: George L. Rives
- Succeeded by: Josiah Quincy

Acting United States Secretary of State
- In office February 24, 1893 – March 6, 1893
- President: Benjamin Harrison; Grover Cleveland
- Preceded by: John W. Foster
- Succeeded by: Walter Q. Gresham
- In office June 4, 1892 – June 29, 1892
- President: Benjamin Harrison
- Preceded by: James G. Blaine
- Succeeded by: John W. Foster

Personal details
- Born: William Fisher Wharton; June 28, 1847 Boston, Massachusetts, U.S.
- Died: May 20, 1919 (aged 71) Boston, Massachusetts, U.S.
- Spouses: Fanny Pickman (m. 1877; died 1880): Susan Carberry Lay
- Parent(s): William Craig; Nancy W. Wharton
- Education: Harvard College

William Fisher Wharton (June 28, 1847 – May 20, 1919), was a Boston attorney who served as the United States Assistant Secretary of State from 1889 to 1893.

== Early years ==
William Fisher Wharton was born in the Jamaica Plain section of Boston, Massachusetts on June 28, 1847; he was the son of William Craig and Nancy W. Wharton. Both of his parents were well known in upper-class Boston society. William attended Harvard College, graduating in 1870 with honors in Greek, Latin and Ancient History. He graduated from Harvard Law School in 1873 and was admitted to the bar not long afterwards. After traveling in Europe for several years, he began practicing law in Boston in 1875. In 1877, he married Fanny Pickman, but she died three years later. He subsequently remarried, to Susan Carberry Lay. He was the father of one son with his first wife, and a son and a daughter with his second wife.

== Massachusetts political career ==
Wharton entered politics in late 1879, when he first ran for office. In December of that year, Boston elected a Democratic mayor, Frederick O. Prince, but Republicans won the majority in the Common Council (later known as the City Council); among the elected Republicans was William F. Wharton. He was appointed to two committees: finance and ordinances. He became known for his work revising and updating city ordinances, and by 1884, after having been re-elected twice, he was named chairman of the ordinances committee. Wharton also became known for being fiscally prudent while serving on the finance committee; for example, he disapproved of granting pay raises to city officials, saying he believed they were making a sufficient amount of money already. Wharton was well-regarded by the city's political establishment: the Boston Herald praised his work on the council, saying he had become "one of the most influential members of the lower branch of the city government." Subsequently, Wharton continued to move up in Massachusetts politics, getting elected to the House of Representatives in 1885. He served there until 1888, becoming the chairman of the rules committee as well as working on issues related to the railroads.

== National politics ==
Wharton was chosen by Republican President Benjamin Harrison to serve as Assistant Secretary of State. He took the oath of office on April 11, 1889. It does not appear that Wharton had as influential a role in national politics as he had in Massachusetts: newspaper articles of that time rarely mentioned him, focusing instead on Secretary of State James G. Blaine. But when Blaine became ill in 1892, Wharton's duties and responsibilities increased. And towards the end of Harrison's term in office, Wharton was doing Blaine's job; he served as acting secretary of state for about a month. When Harrison's presidency ended, Wharton decided he was no longer interested in politics, and told the press he planned to return to Boston and resume the practice of law.

== After politics ==
William F. Wharton moved back to his home on Beacon Street in downtown Boston, and while he remained a loyal supporter of Republican causes, he did not run for office again, despite calls by the Boston Herald for him to do so. He was active in the Boston Bar Association, as well as the Massachusetts Bar Association. He and his wife had a summer home in Groton, where they socialized with members of Boston's most influential families. Wharton died at his Boston home, on May 20, 1919, at the age of 72. Despite being very influential in local politics in Massachusetts in the 1880s and 1890s, today it is all but forgotten: a Boston Globe article in January 2013 noted that "Some of the even more obscure [Secretaries of State] include William F. Wharton, who was acting secretary of state twice in the early 1890s. He is so forgotten that he does not even have his own Wikipedia page." But although Wharton remains relatively unknown, at least now, he does have his own Wikipedia entry.

Political offices
Preceded by George L. Rives	United States Assistant Secretary of State; 1889–1893	Succeeded by Josiah Quincy
Preceded by James G. Blaine	United States Secretary of State; Ad interim 1892	Succeeded by John W. Foster
Preceded by John W. Foster	United States Secretary of State; Ad interim 1893	Succeeded by Walter Q. Gresham
