= Thomas Walker (explorer) =

American physician and explorer

Member of the Virginia House of Burgesses representing Louisa County
- In office 1752–1755 Serving with Abraham Venable
- Preceded by: Charles Barrett
- Succeeded by: Robert Anderson

Member of the Virginia House of Burgesses representing Hampshire County
- In office 1756–1761 Serving with Gabriel Jones
- Preceded by: Gabriel Jones
- Succeeded by: James Keith

Member of the Virginia House of Burgesses representing Albemarle County
- In office 1761–1772 Serving with Henry Fry, Edward Carter, Thomas Jefferson
- Preceded by: Allen Howard
- Succeeded by: John Walker

Member of the Virginia House of Delegates representing Albemarle County
- In office May 1782 – May 1783 Serving with Thomas Jefferson
- Preceded by: Isaac Davis
- Succeeded by: George Nicholas

Personal details
- Born: January 25, 1715 Walkerton, King and Queen County, Virginia
- Died: November 9, 1794 (age 79) Castle Hill, Albemarle County, Virginia, U.S.
- Spouses: Mildred Thornton (m. 1741) Elizabeth Thornton (m. 1781)
- Children: 12, including John and Francis
- Known for: politician, explorer

Thomas Walker (January 25, 1715 – November 9, 1794) was a physician, planter and explorer in colonial Virginia who served multiple terms in the Virginia General Assembly, and whose descendants also had political careers. Walker explored the Western Colony of Virginia (present-day Kentucky) in 1750, a full 19 years before the arrival of famed frontiersman Daniel Boone.

== Early life ==
Thomas Walker was born at "Rye Field", Walkerton, King and Queen County, Virginia. He was raised as an Englishman in the Tidewater region of Virginia. Walker's first profession was that of a physician; he had attended the College of William & Mary and studied under his brother-in-law Dr. George Gilmer.

Walker married Mildred Thornton (widow of Nicholas Meriwether) in 1741, and acquired land and owned enslaved people in the soon-to be formed Albemarle County from her late husband's estate. The couple built a home known as Castle Hill and had 12 children. They in turn would later become prominent Albemarle County citizens in their own right. Two of Walker's sons, John and Francis Walker, became U.S. Congressmen. After the death of his first wife, in 1781 Walker married Elizabeth Thornton.

== Planter and burgess ==
In April 1744, Walker was elected as vestryman at his church, a position he held for more than forty years, until 1785. He also served Virginia as a delegate to the House of Burgesses many times, first from Louisa County, then newly formed Hampshire County in the Appalachian region, and finally from Albemarle County. Walker also became a trustee of the newly formed town of Charlottesville.

Around 1742, Walker brought several English Foxhounds to Keswick, which the Keswick Hunt Club describes as the beginning of fox-hunting in the region.

== Pioneer and explorer ==
On July 12, 1749, the Loyal Land Company was founded with Walker as a leading member, along with fellow surveyors Joshua Fry and Peter Jefferson, as well as many investors. After receiving a royal grant of 800,000 acres (320,000 ha) in what is now southeastern Kentucky (which was occupied by Native Americans), the company appointed Walker to lead an expedition to explore and survey the region in 1750, so he set out, probably along the Wilderness Road. Walker also bought a plantation from Frye along the Hardware River in Albemarle County, in part to pay sums due him for his surveying services. Fellow stockholders elected Walker head of the Loyal Land Company in 1752.

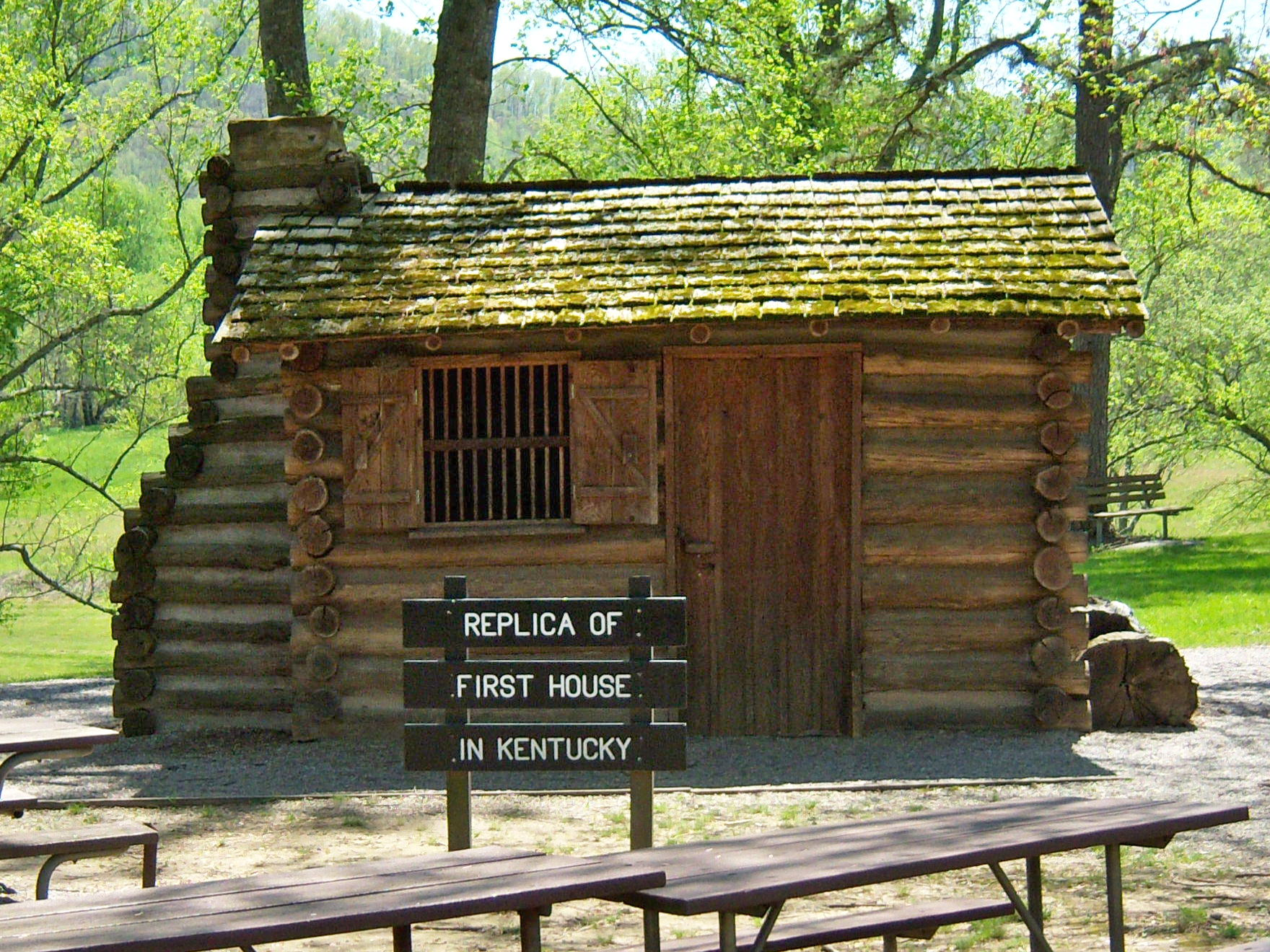
Replica of the first house built in Kentucky

During the expedition, Walker gave names to many topographical features, including the Cumberland Gap. His party built the first non-Indian house (a cabin) in Kentucky, and helped Virginia pioneer Samuel Stalnaker build his home on the westernmost point in colonial Virginia. Walker kept a daily journal of the trip.

During some of his expeditions, Walker explored with fellow Virginian, Indian agent, legislator, surveyor and later Revolutionary War general, Joseph Martin, as some of the first colonialists to travel in this area. Martin's son, Revolutionary War officer Colonel William Martin, described the naming of the area and river in a letter to historian Lyman Draper,

A treaty with the Cherokees was held at Fort Chiswell on New River, then a frontier. On the return of the chiefs home, Dr. [Thomas] Walker, a gentleman of distinction, and my father, [General] Joseph Martin, accompanied them. The Indians being guides, they passed through the place now called Cumberland Gap, where they discovered a fine spring. They still had a little rum remaining, and they drank to the health of the Duke of Cumberland. This gave rise to the name of Cumberland Mountain and Cumberland River.

At age 64, Walker again traveled to the western areas of what is now Kentucky and Tennessee; he had been commissioned to survey the border between westward of the Virginia and North Carolina. (At that time each state claimed the land to the west of their boundaries for ultimate settlement by the right of discovery.) Because the border was mapped and surveyed, rather than created along the natural boundary of a river, it was considered controversial. It was called the "Walker Line" and still constitutes the border between Kentucky and Tennessee from east to west terminating at the Tennessee River.

Walker was influential in dealing with Indian affairs. He was appointed to represent Virginia at the Treaty of Fort Stanwix and Treaty of Lochaber (1770), and dealt with the peace negotiations after the Battle of Point Pleasant. In 1775, Walker served as a Virginia commissioner in negotiations with representatives of the Iroquois Six Nations in Pittsburgh, as the colonies tried to engage them as allies against the British.

He is credited as the first to discover and use coal in Kentucky. Because of his broad knowledge of the areas and their resources, Walker became an adviser to Thomas Jefferson from 1780 to 1783 as the future president wrote his Notes on the State of Virginia (1785).

== Death, legacy and honors ==
Thomas Walker died on November 9, 1794, at his home of Castle Hill.

Kentucky built a replica of the cabin which his expedition put up in present-day Kentucky; it has been designated as the Dr. Thomas Walker State Historic Site. Thomas Walker High School is one of two high schools in Lee County, Virginia. It is located one mile east of the town of Ewing, and three miles west of the town of Rose Hill. Thomas Walker High School was built in 1940. It was built to combine Rose Hill High School and Ewing High School. The high school was remodeled and enlarged in 1959. The last addition was added to Thomas Walker High School in 1971. The Rose Hill District is made up of two towns, Rose Hill and Ewing.
