= Amélie Rives Troubetzkoy =

American writer (1863–1945)

Amélie Rives Troubetzkoy Princess Troubetzkoy
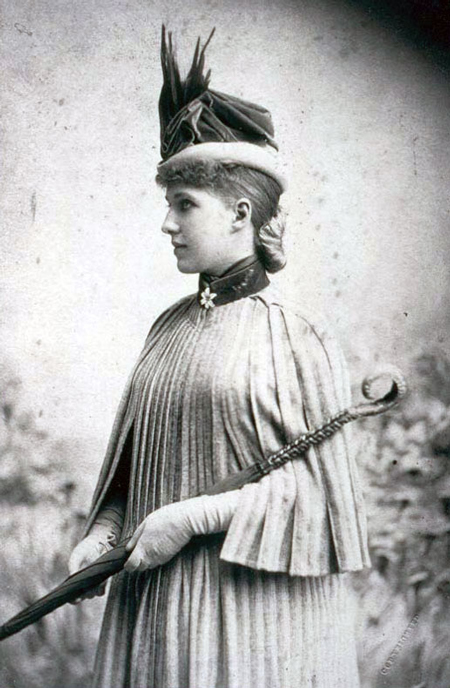
- Amélie Rives in 1890
- Born: Amélie Louise Rives; August 23, 1863; Richmond, Virginia, C.S
- Died: June 15, 1945 (aged 81)
- Resting place: Rives Troubetzkoy Cemetery, Cismont, Virginia
- Occupation: Author
- Spouses: John Armstrong Chanler (m. 1888; div. 1896) Pierre Troubetzkoy (m. 1896)
- Relatives: William Cabell Rives (grandfather); Robert E. Lee (godfather)
- Writing career
- Language: English
- Genres: novels, poetry, plays

Princess Amélie Rives Troubetzkoy (August 23, 1863 – June 15, 1945) was an American author of novels, poetry, and plays. The Quick or the Dead? (1888), her first novel, which sold 300,000 copies, created more of a sensation than any of her later work. Her 1914 novel, World's End was reputed to be "the best seller in New York City". Described as a genius who was morbidly sensitive, she was a woman of moods and fancies, but in manner, as simple as a child.

== Early life and education ==
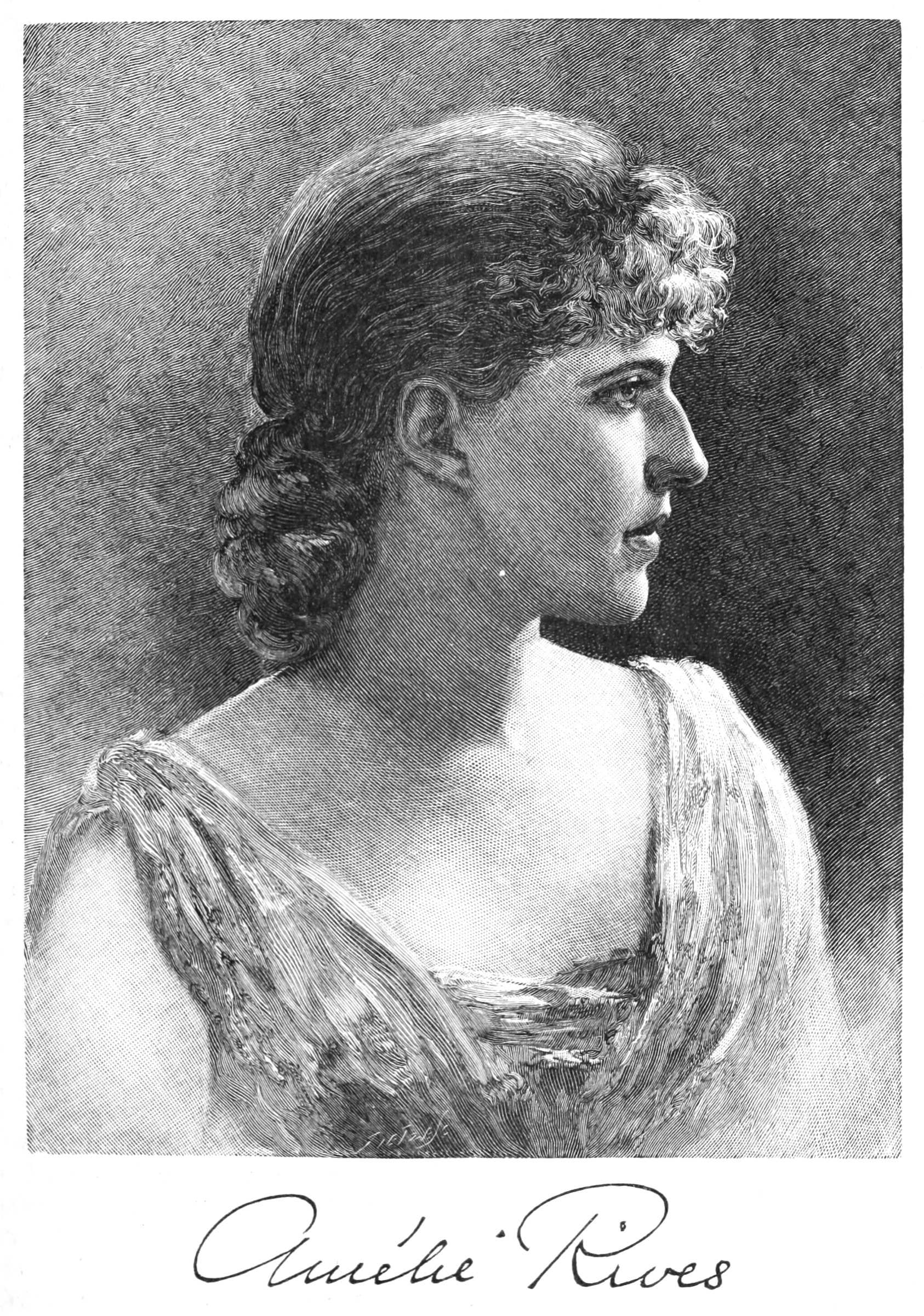
Portrait by Richard G. Tietze, published in Harper's in 1887

Amélie Louise Rives was born August 23, 1863, in Richmond, Virginia, to Alfred L. Rives, an engineer, and Sadie MacMurdo. She was named after her aunt, Amélie, a goddaughter of French Queen Marie-Amélie. She was a goddaughter of Robert E. Lee and a granddaughter of the engineer and Senator William Cabell Rives, Minister Plenipotentiary to France in the early part of the 19th century.

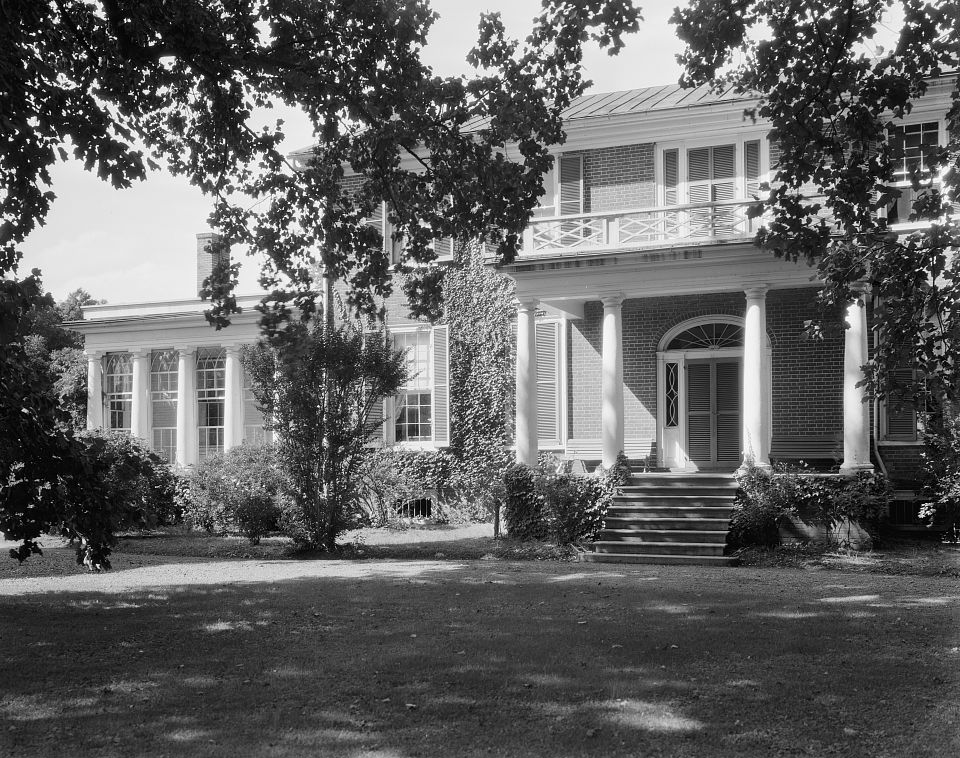
Castle Hill

Troubetzkoy's early life was spent at Castle Hill, Albemarle County, Virginia, and later the family moved to Mobile, Alabama. She was educated entirely at home under private tutors. She was always an imaginative child who delighted in gathering around her the neighbors' children and rehearsing to them her new ideas. She was then and later, morbidly sensitive, and there was no estimating how much that may have accounted for many of her peculiarities, and much concerning her that was not understood.

== Career ==
By the time Rives was fifteen, she had written verses, essays, and stories, but with no intention of publishing them. Like Nathaniel Hawthorne for many years, she destroyed all that she wrote. The editor of the Atlantic Monthly said that Rives never spoke of herself or her writings. "Instead of pushing her work upon me, she was so modest about it that I had to get the first story published through her mother." Her first published work, A Brother to Dragons, appeared in The Atlantic Monthly in 1886 and attracted immediate attention for its daring originality. Other stories soon followed, including Farrier Lam of Piping Pebworth, Nurse Crumpet's Story, Story of Arnon, and Virginia of Virginia, as well as several poems.

Rives' first novel, The Quick or the Dead?, was published in 1888 and remains her most famous and popular work. The novel, which depicts a newly widowed woman struggling with her erotic passion for her late husband's cousin, was condemned as "immoral", "unfit to be read", and "impure". Rives was criticized for pandering to the public and offending the refined tastes of readers who had been previously charmed by her stories. The negative publicity helped the notorious book sell over 300,000 copies.

In 1889, Rives published Herod and Marianne, a tragedy based upon the historical facts given by Josephus. It was filled with passion, deep intrigue, wild jealousy, hatred, murder, and terrible revenge. It was undoubtedly a strong play, demonstrating literary and' dramatic genius, but it was said to need "pruning to rid it of its coarseness and passion, and make it acceptable". Had Troubetzkhoy intended all that her readers found in her last named works she would have continued in the same vein when Barbara Denny appeared. This was as free as possible from all that could offend, showing that the author was not conscious of much that her former words implied. Her 1914 novel, World's End was reputed to be "the best seller in New York City". Her other works included The Witness of the Sun, Athelwold, According to St. John, and Tanis, the Sang Digger. "The Critic" said, "She sees Nature with the eye of a painter, and describes it with the voice of a poet."

Later, she turned to theater and began writing plays for Broadway. Her play The Fear Market ran for 118 performances at the Booth Theatre in 1916.

== Personal life ==
In 1888, Amélie Rives married John Armstrong Chanler, a great-great grandson of John Jacob Astor and the oldest of 10 orphaned siblings, born to John Winthrop Chanler and Margaret Astor Ward of the Astor family. The courtship was at Newport. They spent the years of 1890–91 in Europe. The Rives-Chanler marriage was scandalous, and unhappy. The couple spent seven years as husband and wife, but most of the time lived apart. Rives reportedly flirted with George Curzon and began using drugs.

In 1896, just four months after their divorce, she married Prince Pierre Troubetzkoy, an artist and aristocrat after Oscar Wilde introduced them in London. The couple resided at Castle Hill.

She studied art in Paris, and her friends feared that its fascinations would interfere with her literary work. Her health became impaired, however, so that she was forced to abandon the brush and then it was that she resumed the pen. Troubetzkoy was a close friend of novelist Julia Magruder, a frequent guest at Castle Hill, as well as prominent New York novelist Louis Auchincloss, who included a chapter on her in his memoir, A Writer's Capital.

== Death and legacy ==
She died June 15, 1945. Troubetzkoy's papers are held at the Albert and Shirley Small Special Collections Library of the University of Virginia.

== Novels ==
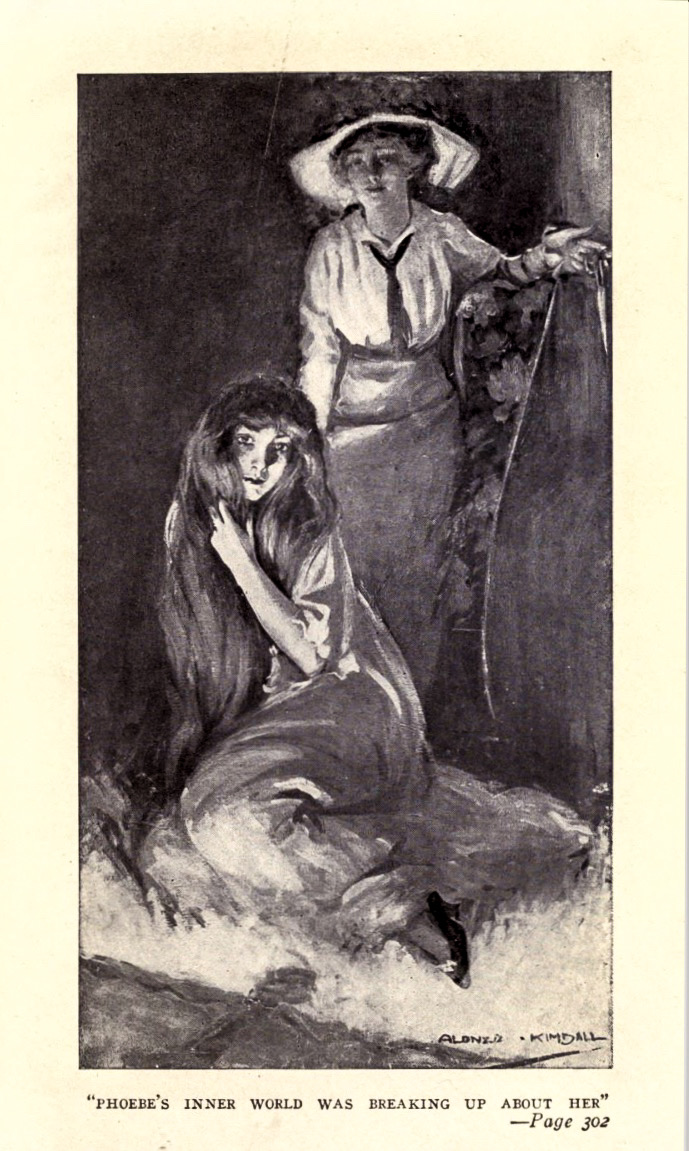
Illustration in World's End, reproduced from painting by Alonzo Myron Kimball

- A Brother to Dragons and Other Old-time Tales (Harper & Brothers, New York, 1888)
- Virginia of Virginia (Harper & Brothers, New York, 1888)
- Herod and Mariamne (Harper & Brothers, New York, 1888)
- The Quick or the Dead? A Study (J. B. Lippincott Co., Philadelphia, 1888)
- Witness of the Sun (J. B. Lippincott Co., Philadelphia, 1889)
- According to St. John (John W. Lovell Co., New York, 1891)
- Barbara Dering: A Sequel to The Quick or the Dead? (J. B. Lippincott Co., Philadelphia, 1893)
- Tanis the Sang-Digger (Town Topics Publishing Co. New York, 1893)
- Athelwold (Harper & Brothers, New York, 1893)
- Meriel (Chatto & Windas, London, 1898)
- Augustine the Man (John Lane Company, New York, 1906)
- Seléné (Harper & Brothers, New York, 1905)
- A Damsel Errant (Harper & Brothers, New York, 1908)
- The Golden Rose: The Romance of A Strange Soul (Harper & Brothers, New York, 1908)
- Trix and Over-the-Moon (Harper & Brothers, New York, 1909)
- Pan's Mountain (Harper & Brothers, New York, 1910)
- Hidden House (J. B. Lippincott Co., Philadelphia, 1912)
- World's End (Frederick A. Stokes & Co., New York, 1914)
- Shadows of Flames (Hurst & Blackett, Ltd., London, 1915)
- The Elusive Lady (Hurst & Blackett, Ltd., London)
- The Ghost Garden (S. B. Gundy, Toronto, 1918)
- As The Wind Blew (Frederick A. Stokes & Co., New York, 1920)
- The Sea-Woman's Cloak and November Eve (Stewart Kidd Co., Cincinnati, 1923)
- The Queerness of Celia (Frederick A. Stokes Company, New York, 1926)
- Firedamp (Frederick A. Stokes Company, New York, 1930)
