= Ferrocarril de Veracruz al Istmo =

Former Mexican railway company

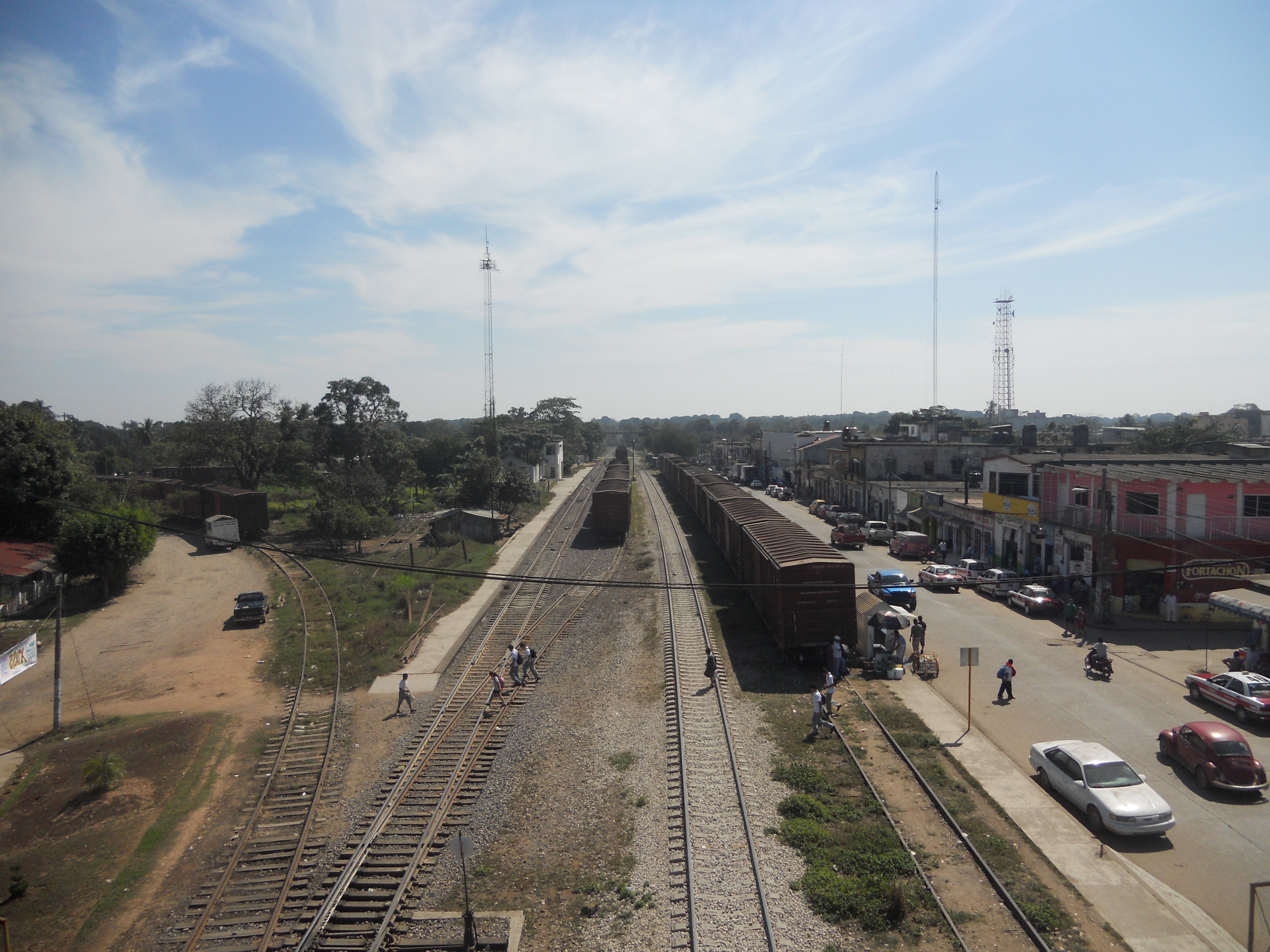
- The railroad track of Tres Valles

Overview
- Locale: Veracruz
- Dates of operation: 1898–1913
- Predecessor: Vera Cruz and Pacific Railroad
- Successor: Ferrocarriles Nacionales de México (now Ferromex and Ferrosur)

Technical
- Track gauge: 1,435 mm (4 ft 8 1/2 in)

The Ferrocarril de Veracruz al Istmo (Vera Cruz and Isthmus Railway) was one of the primary pre-nationalization railways of Mexico. Incorporated in West Virginia in 1898 as the Vera Cruz and Pacific Railroad (Ferrocarril de Veracruz al Pacífico), it built a line from Córdoba to Jesús Carranza on the Tehuantepec National Railway, with a branch from Veracruz to Tierra Blanca. The Mexican government gained control in May 1904 and organized the Ferrocarril de Veracruz al Istmo to operate the property under lease.

Control was transferred to the government-owned Ferrocarriles Nacionales de México (National Railways of Mexico) in 1910, and in November 1913, that company took over the property and operations. Following privatization in the 1990s, Ferrosur acquired the former Veracruz al Istmo.
