= Cobham, Albemarle County, Virginia =

Unincorporated community in Virginia, United States

Cobham
- Unincorporated community
- Location within the state of Virginia Cobham (the United States)
- Coordinates: 38°03′46″N 78°16′05″W
- Country: United States
- State: Virginia
- County: Albemarle
- Time zone: UTC−5 (Eastern (EST))
  - Summer (DST): UTC−4 (EDT)
- ZIP codes: 22947
- GNIS feature ID: 1495406

Cobham is an unincorporated community in Albemarle County, Virginia, United States. It was named after Cobham, Surrey in England.

Cobham Park Estate was listed the National Register of Historic Places in 1974.
