= Peter Jefferson =

American planter, cartographer and politician (1708–1757)

Member of the Virginia House of Burgesses from Albemarle County
- In office 1754–1755 Serving with Allen Howard
- Preceded by: Joshua Fry
- Succeeded by: William Cabell

Personal details
- Born: February 29, 1708 Chesterfield County, Virginia, British America
- Died: August 17, 1757 (aged 49) Albemarle County, Virginia, British America
- Resting place: Shadwell, Albemarle County, Virginia
- Spouse: Jane Randolph (m. 1739)
- Children: 10, including Thomas, Lucy, and Randolph
- Parents: Thomas Jefferson ll (father); Mary Field Jefferson (mother)
- Occupation: Tobacco plantation owner, surveyor, cartographer

Peter Jefferson (February 29, 1708 – August 17, 1757) was a planter, cartographer, and politician in colonial Virginia best known for being the father of the third president of the United States, Thomas Jefferson. The "Fry-Jefferson Map", created by Peter in collaboration with Joshua Fry in 1757, accurately charted the Allegheny Mountains for the first time and showed the northbound route of "The Great Road from the Yadkin River through Virginia to Philadelphia distant 455 Miles", which later became Great Wagon Road. The map also indicates the southbound route of the Trading Path from Petersburg, Virginia to Old Hawfields, North Carolina and beyond.

== Early life ==
Jefferson was born at a settlement called Osbornes (Note: Osbornes was also the birthplace of his father, Captain Thomas Jefferson in 1677. The settlement was a local shipping center and tobacco inspection station. His father, Thomas Jefferson, was a captain in the local militia and justice of the peace. During the American Revolutionary War, Osbornes was the site of the action at Osborne's, a minor naval–land engagement on April 27, 1781, in the James River.) along the James River in present-day Chesterfield County, Virginia, the son of Captain Thomas Jefferson (1679–1731), a large property owner, and Mary Field (1680–1715), who was the daughter of Major Peter Field of New Kent County, Virginia, and granddaughter of Henry Soane (1622–1661), a member of the Virginia House of Burgesses. Jefferson's mother, Mary Field Jefferson, died when he was eight years of age. Peter Jefferson had several brothers and sisters including Judith Jefferson (1698–1786) who married George Farrar (1692–1772), Thomas Jefferson (1700–1723), and Field Jefferson (1702–1765). During his childhood, he learned about plantation management from his father. When he was 18 years of age, he managed his father's plantations. His father died when he was 24 years of age.

He did not receive any formal education while young, but according to his son Thomas Jefferson, he nevertheless "read much and improved himself" and provided for education for his children. He was the fourth child of six children.

== Personal life ==
From his father's estate, he inherited land and slaves in 1731 along the James River near Isham Randolph and his nephew William Randolph of Tuckahoe. Jefferson's residence, called Fine Creek Manor, was in present-day Powhatan County, Virginia near Fine Creek. It is now part of Fine Creek Mills Historic District. He was a sheriff, surveyor, and justice of the peace. In 1734, Jefferson claimed the land in present-day Albemarle County, Virginia, which he eventually named Shadwell. By purchase and patent, Peter Jefferson assembled a second plantation which he called “Snowdon” (aka Snowden), located at the Horseshoe Bend of what was then known as the Fluvanna River (later the James River). The name recalls Mount Snowdon, presumably the home of his Jefferson ancestors.

He married Jane Randolph, daughter of Isham Randolph and granddaughter of William Randolph, in 1739. For a year or two following his marriage, they lived at Fine Creek Manor. Jefferson built a house on the Shadwell tract, after his wife's birthplace, in 1741 or 1742. They moved there sometime before his son, Thomas, was born in 1743. His friend William Randolph, a widower and his wife's cousin, died in 1745, having appointed Jefferson as guardian to manage the Tuckahoe Plantation until his son came of age. That year the Jeffersons relocated to Randolph's plantation in the Fine Creek area.

Jane and Peter offered a privileged life for their family whether in established areas of eastern Virginia or, later, as they settled in the Shadwell plantation of the Piedmont. They ate on fine dishware, frequently entertained, enjoyed classic books and music, and attended dances. The family was considered prosperous and cultured. While at Tuckahoe, Peter also oversaw the development of his plantation at Shadwell, traveling there as needed while also deftly managing the affairs of the Tuckahoe plantation.

In 1752, Jefferson returned to Shadwell, which was improved to include a mill along the Rivanna River. A member of the gentry, he was a host to his peers and to Native Americans who travelled on official business to Colonial Williamsburg. A favored guest was Cherokee chief Ontasseté.

Jefferson had more than sixty slaves at Shadwell.

In 1757, Peter Jefferson died at Shadwell, and his land was divided between his two sons, young Thomas and Randolph. Thomas inherited the land along the Rivanna River with views of the mountain to be called Monticello. Randolph inherited "Snowdon," the so-called Fluvanna Lands.All of his children were beneficiaries of his estate.

=== Children ===
Peter Jefferson had ten children:

- Jane Jefferson (1740–1765), who died unmarried at age 25
- Mary Jefferson Bolling (1741–1803), who married John Bolling III (born 1737), who served in the Virginia House of Burgesses and was a descendant of Pocahontas
- Thomas Jefferson (1743–1826), primary author of the United States Declaration of Independence and third president of the United States, who married Martha Wayles Skelton (1748–1782)
- Elizabeth Jefferson (1744–1774), mentally handicapped who died unmarried
- Martha Jefferson Carr (1746–1811), married Dabney Carr (1743–1773), founder of the underground Committee of Correspondence in Virginia on the eve of the American Revolution
- Peter Field Jefferson (1748), died as an infant
- unnamed son (1750), died as an infant
- Lucy Jefferson Lewis (1752–1810), married Charles Lilburn Lewis (1747–1831/1837)
- Anne Scott Jefferson Marks (1755–1828), twin of Randolph, married Hastings Marks
- Randolph Jefferson (1755–1815), twin of Anna Scott, married Anne Lewis, later Mitchie Ballow Pryor

Thomas Jefferson, Lucy Jefferson, and Randolph Jefferson had several descendants in common with the Lewis family of Virginia.

== Career ==
The 1751 map by Peter Jefferson and Joshua Fry depicting the Great Wagon Road to Philadelphia

Andrew Burstein in The Washington Post described Peter Jefferson as "an accomplished, strong-minded, self-reliant frontiersman" of the eighteenth century who migrated within Virginia to the western uplands called the Piedmont. He was among the initial settlers of Albemarle County, Virginia in 1737 and acquired property over the years to farm tobacco. By the time of his death, he held 7,200 acres.

Albemarle's founders lived their lives as tobacco planters, militiamen, road builders; they were ambitious, practical, businesslike individuals. Planters large and small transported their tobacco or wheat on tied-together canoes along the Rivanna River (three feet deep in most places during the navigable months of November to June) and eastward along the James. Most roads were forest paths, such as the Richmond-Albemarle passage skirting Shadwell...

— Andrew Burstein in The Washington Post

He was also a cartographer and surveyor. In 1746, he and Thomas Lewis ran the Fairfax Line, a surveyor's line between the headwaters of the Rappahannock and North Branch Potomac Rivers, which established the limits of the "Northern Neck land grant" (also known as the "Fairfax Grant").

In 1749, Peter Jefferson, along with Joshua Fry, Thomas Walker, Edmund Pendleton and others, established the Loyal Company of Virginia, and were granted 800,000 acres (3,200 km^{2}) in present-day Virginia, West Virginia and Kentucky. In the same year, with Joshua Fry, Jefferson extended the survey of the Virginia-North Carolina border, begun by William Byrd II some time earlier. The detailed Fry-Jefferson Map, cited by his son Thomas in his 1781 book Notes on the State of Virginia, was produced by him and Fry.

In 1754 and 1755, he served in the Virginia House of Burgesses.

== See also ==
- John Harvie Sr., Peter Jefferson's chief executor and guardian of Thomas
- North Carolina–Tennessee–Virginia Corners
- Thomas Jefferys, in 1776 producer of The American Atlas: Or, A Geographical Description Of The Whole Continent Of America
