= Loyal Company of Virginia =

Land speculation group (1749-1776)

Loyal Company of Virginia or Loyal Land Company was a land speculation company formed in Virginia in 1749 for the purpose of recruiting settlers to western Virginia. The company continued operations until May 15, 1776, when Virginia declared independence from Great Britain though litigation on behalf of and against the company continued until 1872.

== Formation ==
On July 12, 1748, the Virginia Council, the executive body of the Virginia House of Burgesses, approved a grant of 800,000 acres (324,000 hectares) to a consortium of investors. The grant was located west of the Blue Ridge Mountains, north of the undefined border with North Carolina and on the "western waters", i.e. in the Ohio Valley watershed. Unlike the Ohio Company which was required to recruit settlers to its lands, the Loyal Company was only required to file surveys on the lands it claimed and allowed four years to do so.

== Founders ==
The primary founder of the Loyal Company of Virginia was John Lewis, a prominent pioneer in the Shenandoah Valley. The management and direction of the company was concentrated in Lewis and three other men: Thomas Walker, Joshua Fry, and Peter Jefferson.

Other founding members were John Meriwether, Charles Lewis, James Power, Charles Dick, Charles Barrett, Thomas Turpin, John Harvie, Thomas Meriwether, Thomas Meriwether, Jr., John Baylor, Samuel Waddy, Robert Barrett, George Robinson Henry Willis, Peachy Gilmer, James Maury, Thomas Lewis, Peter Hedgman, John Moore, Robert Martin, Henry Tate, Richard Jones, William Wood, Samuel Dalton, Francis Thornton, Francis Thornton, Jr., Nicholas Meriwether, William Hudson, Francis Meriwether, Humphrey Hill, John Dixon, and Edmund Pendleton.

== Early Operations ==
The company was formed at a meeting held on December 12, 1749. John Lewis was appointed as the head of the company for a term of four years. Thomas Walker was appointed the company's agent for exploration.

On March 6, 1750, Walker started the first of many trips into southwest Virginia and what is now Kentucky. The party led by Walker erected a cabin at what is now Barbourville, KY, to establish the Loyal Company's claim to the territory.

Due to the vague description of various land grants the Loyal Company found itself regularly embroiled in disputes with the Ohio Company and the New River Company of James Patton. The lack of certainty over land title slowed the process of attracting settlers and on June 14, 1753, the Loyal Company was granted a four-year extension to its deadline for surveying claims.

The company also planned a substantial western expedition in 1753, to be led by Walker, with objectives that foreshadowed the Lewis and Clark Expedition. James Maury described the proposed trip in a 1756 letter: "Some persons were to be sent in search of that river Missouri, if that be the right name of it, in order to discover whether it had any communication with the Pacific Ocean; they were to follow the river if they found it, and exact reports of the country they passed through, the distances they traveled, what worth of navigation those river and lakes afforded etc."

== French and Indian War ==
The outbreak of the French and Indian War retarded the activities of the Loyal Company, and the western expedition never took place. Thomas Walker was appointed agent for the expedition of Edward Braddock and commissary general for all Virginia troops and ceased to actively explore on behalf of the Loyal Company.

In the aftermath of Braddock's defeat, extensive Indian raids into the Shenandoah Valley resulted in the abandonment of farms and homesteads by a majority of settlers. This reduced the demand for land owned by the Loyal Company and made surveying expeditions very dangerous.

== Proclamation of 1763 and Afterwards ==
The charter of the Loyal Company expired in 1757. No attempt was made to obtain another extension until 1763. On May 25, 1763, the company asked for another extension of the charter on the grounds that the French and Indian War had interrupted operation.

The petition was denied based on British policy first stated in 1761 and later codified in the Royal Proclamation of 1763 that restricted settlement beyond the crest of the Appalachian Mountains.

Undeterred by this official rebuff, the Loyal Company resumed survey operations in contravention of the Royal Proclamation of 1763. Colonial agitation continued against the Proclamation which led to the Treaty of Fort Stanwix in 1768. Significantly the Virginia delegation was led by Thomas Walker and Andrew Lewis, who led the Greenbrier Company. This treaty effectively made the Ohio River the western bound of colonial expansion. Further gains were made by the land speculation companies at the Treaty of Lochaber, where Walker again represented Virginia's interests.

The land sold by the Loyal Company west of the Appalachian's crest came into conflict with land granted by Governor Robert Dinwiddie to Virginia officers for service during the war. The officers were represented by Colonel George Washington. Eventually this was resolved by the Virginia Governor's Council recognizing all land sold by the Loyal Company.

== American Revolution ==
The state government of Virginia established after the Declaration of Independence was ambivalent towards companies operating under Royal charters. On October 27, 1778, Walker, on behalf of the Loyal Company, asked the Virginia House of Delegates to confirm title to the land granted it. On November 11, 1778, the House of Delegates decided to recognize all sales made by the Loyal Company but it refused to confirm the company's right to do further surveys and sales.

This action effectively brought the activities of the Loyal Company to a close. Litigation continued on behalf of the company to have its claims recognized and against the company by other landowners and speculators.

== See also ==
- Royal Land Company of Virginia
