= Royal Land Company of Virginia =

- Industry: mining manufacturing
- Founded: 27 March 1876
- Headquarters: Rockingham County, Virginia, U.S.
- Products: coals; iron ores; copper; asbestos; marl; manganese; building stones; agricultural; mechanical; timber

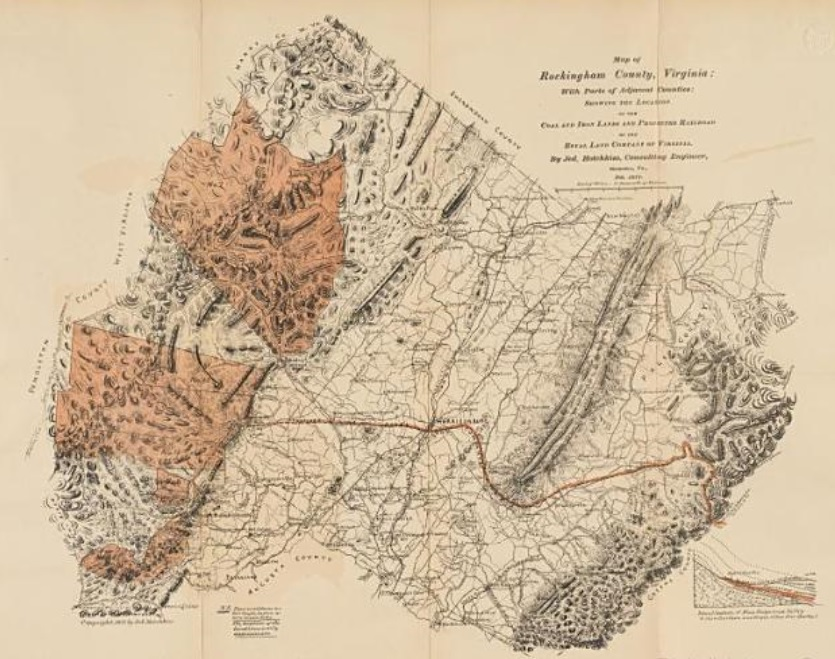
Lands of Royal Land Company in Rockingham County, Virginia

The Royal Land Company of Virginia was established in Rockingham County, Virginia, on March 27, 1876, for the purpose of purchasing and developing mineral lands, mines, and manufacturing their products. It purchased, in 1876, from private parties and corporations, the fee simple and leases of numerous tracts of coal, iron, other mineral, and timber lands in Virginia and West Virginia, aggregating 154,997.75 acres (62,725.36 ha).

== Products and services ==
The company specialised in bituminous and anthracite coals, hematite, specular and magnetic iron ores, copper, asbestos, marl, manganese and other minerals, building stones, and the agricultural, mechanical, timber, and other resources of the country tributary to its railway lines.

== Railroads ==
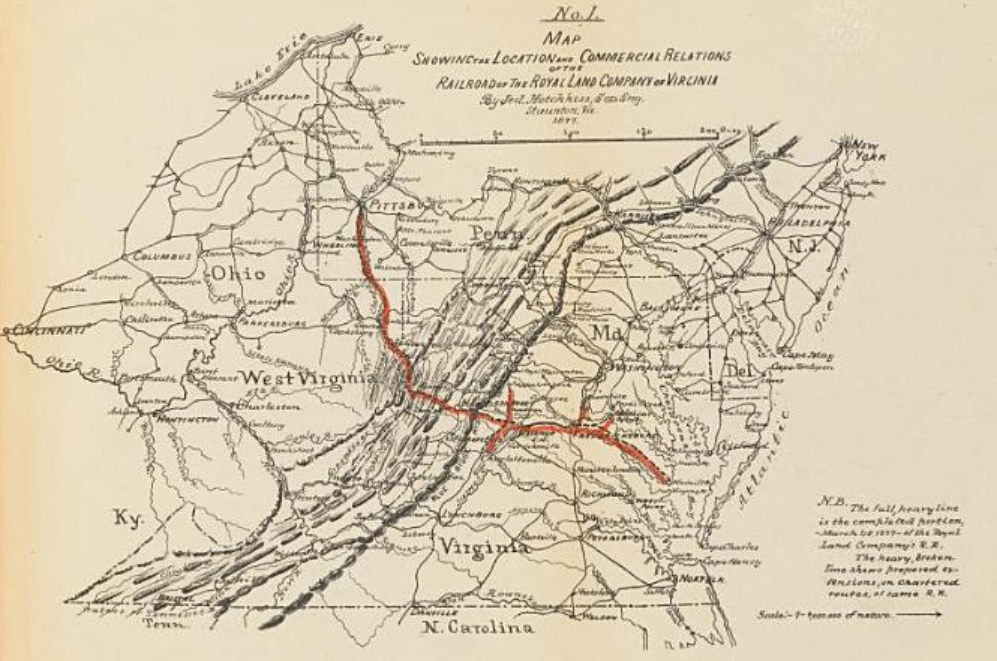
Location and commercial relations of the Royal Land Company of Virginia

The company operated the following railroads:

- Potomac, Fredericksburg and Piedmont Railroad
- Shenandoah Valley and Ohio Railroad
- Railroad charters in West Virginia

== See also ==
- Loyal Company of Virginia
