= Lucy Jefferson Lewis =

Sister of US President Thomas Jefferson (1752–1810)

- Born: Lucy Jefferson; October 10, 1752; Tuckahoe, Goochland County, Virginia
- Died: May 26, 1810 (aged 57); Livingston County, Kentucky
- Known for: Sister of Thomas Jefferson and wife of Charles Lilburn Lewis
- Spouse: Charles Lilburn Lewis (m. 1769)
- Children: 10, including Isham Lewis, Lilburne Lewis
- Parent(s): Peter Jefferson; Jane Randolph

Lucy Lewis (née Jefferson; October 10, 1752 – May 26, 1810) was a younger sister of United States President Thomas Jefferson and the wife of Charles Lilburn Lewis.

== Early life and education ==
Born in Tuckahoe (plantation), she was the eighth of Peter Jefferson and Jane Randolph Jefferson's 10 children. She was nine years younger than her brother Thomas Jefferson. (Note: Thomas Jefferson had named a daughter, Lucy Elizabeth Jefferson I (1780–1781), after his sisters Lucy and Elizabeth. After she died as an infant, he named his next daughter after Lucy and Elizabeth as well, as was the custom. The second Lucy (1782–1784) died at the age of 2 of whooping cough while her father was serving in Paris in the late 1780s as US Minister to France.) She was born into an elite planter family and would have been educated at home by her mother, together with her sisters. Their father died when they were young.

== Marriage and family ==
At age 16, Jefferson married her first cousin, Charles Lilburne Lewis, on September 12, 1769. He was related to Meriwether Lewis, who would help lead the Lewis and Clark Expedition. The couple eventually had eight children: Randolph, Isham, Jane Jefferson, Lilburne, Mary Randolph, Lucy B., Martha, Ann (Nancy), and Elizabeth .

Her brother, Thomas Jefferson, did not seem to be close to Lucy after her marriage. He was not close to the men in the Lewis family and disliked Charles Lewis' sister, Elizabeth Henderson.

Jane and Mary had married before 1806 and established their own households. The remainder of the Lewis family moved to Livingston County, Kentucky, in 1806 or 1808, following their grown sons Randolph and Lilburne and their families. Charles and Lucy Lewis built a plantation called "Rocky Hill" near the present-day town of Smithland. Lucy's older brother Thomas Jefferson took an interest in the education of her sons, and encouraged them in their studies.

Lucy Jefferson Lewis died in 1810. She was buried on the grounds of the Rocky Hill plantation, but the gravesite has been lost. The estate is now in ruins.

In 1812, the year after Lucy and her son Randolph died, the brothers Lilburne and Isham Lewis murdered a slave named George. The men tried to hide the youth's remains, but his skull was revealed by the collapse of a chimney during the second New Madrid earthquake. The brothers were arrested but received bail. Before the trial, Lilburne urged Isham to join him in a suicide pact, but died almost by accident while preparing, and Isham did not go through with it. Held as an accessory in his brother's suicide while it was investigated, Isham escaped from jail and disappeared. The murder of the slave and suicide by Lilburne brought the entire family into disrepute.

== Commemoration ==
- In Livingston County, a monument honoring Lucy Jefferson Lewis was erected by the Daughters of the American Revolution at the intersection of U.S. Route 60 and Kentucky Route 137.
- A few miles south of the monument, a bridge named in her honor, the Lucy Jefferson Lewis Memorial Bridge, spans the Cumberland River on U.S. Route 60 at Smithland.
- An obelisk in her memory was placed in the Rocky Hill Cemetery by the local chapter of the DAR, which was named for her.

== See also ==
- Ancestry of Thomas Jefferson (also Lucy's ancestors)
