= Slave George =

American murder victim (1794–1811)

George Lewis
- Born: c. 1794; Virginia
- Died: 15 December 1811 (aged 17)

George Lewis (also known as Slave George or Lilburn Lewis' slave George) (c. 1794 – December 15, 1811) was a 17-year-old African American boy held as a slave; he was murdered in western Kentucky on the night of December 15–16, 1811 by Lilburne and Isham Lewis, grown sons of Dr. Charles Lilburn Lewis and Lucy Jefferson Lewis, and nephews of Thomas Jefferson. The brothers were also related to Meriwether Lewis of Lewis and Clark fame.

Because the killing coincided with the time and location of the New Madrid earthquake and the ensuing disgrace of the prominent Lewis family, accounts of it quickly became part of the regional and national lore. Soon after being released on bail, Lilburne Lewis shot himself. Jailed after his brother's death, Isham escaped and disappeared from the area, and is believed to have perished in the Battle of New Orleans in January 1815.

== Early life and education ==
George was born into slavery in 1794 in Virginia and held by the Lewis family. He grew up as a house slave and learned what was needed in the kitchen and other areas. When Randolph and Lilburne Lewis decided to move to Kentucky in 1806 with their families, they took their slaves with them, including George.

== Background ==
In early 1811, Lilburne and Isham Lewis were still in mourning for their mother and older brother Randolph, who had died the year before. Lilburne had also lost his first wife in 1811. He had remarried a local woman named Letitia. She was pregnant with their first child by early 1812, and Lilburne was struggling to support his first five children after a series of financial setbacks. George was a 17-year-old slave held by Lilburne Lewis. Isham had come to Lilburne on an extended visit, and that night after George accidentally broke a water pitcher that belonged to their mother; angered, they killed him in front of seven other slaves.

In a drunken rage, they seized George, tied him to the floor of the kitchen cabin. The brothers assembled their seven slaves and ordered them to build a large fire in the fireplace. Lilburne locked the door and informed his slaves that he intended to end their insolence once and for all. While the terrified slaves stood against the wall, Lilburne struck George in the neck with an ax, and the two brothers compelled one of the slaves to dismember the body. The remains of George's body were burned in the fireplace piecemeal until about 2:00 a.m. when an earthquake hit western Kentucky, causing the chimney to collapse and smother the fire. The next day, during the aftershocks, the Lewis brothers forced their slaves to clean the remains of the body out of the fireplace and begin rebuilding it. They concealed the unburned portions of George's body among the rocks of the reconstructed chimney.

== New Madrid earthquake ==
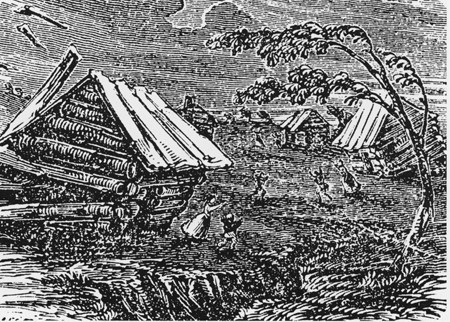
Early depiction of the effects of the December 1811 New Madrid earthquake

The dismemberment of George's decapitated corpse was interrupted by the most powerful U.S. earthquake ever recorded east of the Rocky mountains, the Great New Madrid earthquake, which struck at 3:15 a.m. Eastern time (2:15 a.m. in the Central Standard Time observed in the western Kentucky locale of the murder). Lilburne intended to destroy the evidence by having the slaves burn George's dismembered body, but the New Madrid earthquake caused the chimney to collapse around the fire. (They were likely in the kitchen cabin.) In the days afterward, the brothers made other slaves rebuild the chimney and hide the remains within it. Two additional megaquakes jolted the region on January 23, 1812, and February 7, 1812. The second caused a partial collapse of the chimney that had concealed George's remains.

In early March 1812, a neighborhood dog retrieved the young man's skull and deposited it in open view in a roadway. Neighbors saw the skull and began to inquire about it. They determined it was that of slave George, who was missing, and learned that he had been murdered. In slaveholding areas of the United States, the torturous murder of a slave was illegal.

Lilburne and Isham Lewis were quickly investigated, arrested and charged. After they had been released on bail, on April 9, 1812, Lilburne encouraged his brother to carry out a joint suicide pact with him. However, as Lilburne attempted to demonstrate to his brother how to use a rifle, he accidentally shot himself prematurely. Isham then lost his nerve and did not follow through. Held on investigation as accessory to the suicide and George's murder, Isham escaped from jail and disappeared. Several weeks later, he joined the United States Army under an assumed name to fight in the War of 1812. Isham was killed in action during the Battle of New Orleans on January 8, 1815. (Note: On Pages xxvi & xxvii of his Preface to the 1987 edition of Jefferson's Nephews, Merrill states that Isham "escaped from jail in Salem, Kentucky and six weeks later enlisted for five years in a U.S. Army Infantry company. The day after Isham enlisted, war was declared against England." and "Isham was one of seven men killed on the American side" at the Battle of New Orleans.)

Many books and articles since 1812 have examined the case of slave George and Jefferson's nephews. Historian Boynton Merrill Jr. considered the case as arising out of the power abuses inherent in the institution of slavery, frontier stresses, mounting personal and financial losses in the Lewis family, Lilburne's mental instability, and abuse of alcohol by both brothers.

== Representation in other media ==
- The poet and novelist Robert Penn Warren explored the scandal in his book-length poem Brother to Dragons, A Tale in Verse and Voices (1953, revised 1979).

== See also ==
- Slavery in the United States
- List of slaves
- War of 1812
