= Potomac, Fredericksburg and Piedmont Railroad =

Potomac, Fredericksburg, and Piedmont Railroad
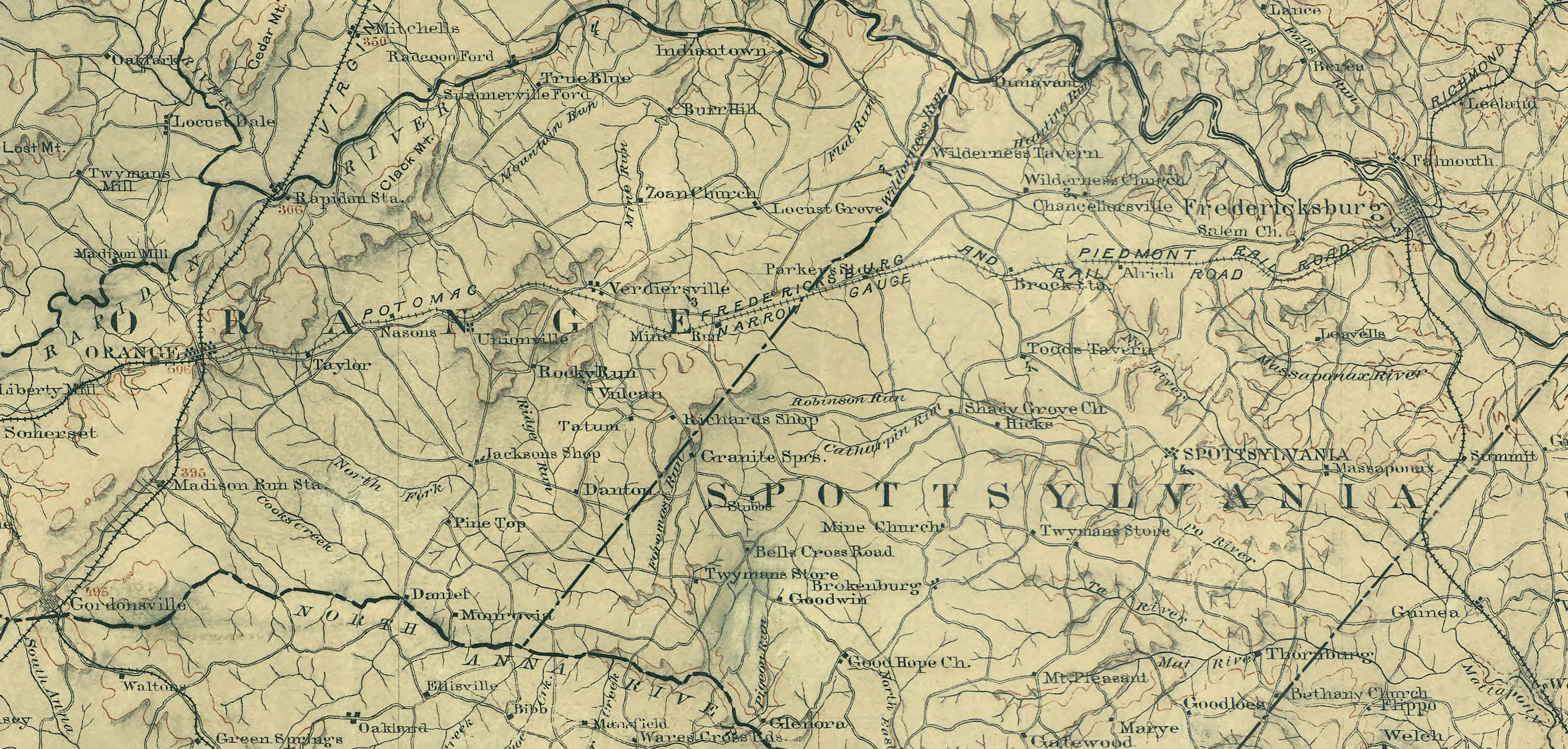
- 1894 map showing the PF&P's line between Fredericksburg and Orange.

Overview
- Reporting mark: PF&P
- Locale: Central Virginia
- Dates of operation: 1876–1926
- Predecessor: Fredericksburg & Gordonsville
- Successor: Virginia Central Railway

Technical
- Track gauge: 3 ft (914 mm)
- Previous gauge: 4 ft 8 1/2 in (1,435 mm) standard gauge
- Length: 38 miles

The Potomac, Fredericksburg, and Piedmont Railroad (PF&P) was a 3 ft (914 mm) narrow gauge short-line railroad in central Virginia that operated between Fredericksburg and Orange, Virginia. It operated until 1926, when its track was sold. A one-mile portion of the former PF&P line continued to be operated as the Virginia Central Railway until the early 1980s. The track has since been removed.

Portions of the East Coast Greenway run along the former railway.

== History ==
The PF&P began as the Fredericksburg and Gordonsville Railroad, incorporated in 1853 by the Virginia General Assembly. By the time of the American Civil War, the Fredericksburg and Gordonsville Railroad had only completed precursory grading work and had laid no track. Therefore, it was referred to as the "unfinished railroad" by both sides in the Battle of Chancellorsville and the Battle of the Wilderness, which were fought on and near its route. During the second day of the latter battle, on May 6, 1864, the roadbed served as a trail used to move forces for a flank attack by Confederate General James Longstreet.

Construction of the line began in 1872 as a 4 ft 8 1/2 in (1,435 mm) standard gauge line; the effort succeeded in laying eighteen miles of track west from Fredericksburg. Late in 1872, the railroad defaulted on a mortgage and was sold under foreclosure. The Fredericksburg, Orange, and Charlottesville Railroad, incorporated by the Virginia General Assembly in February 1872, bought the railroad with the stipulation that if the remaining 20 mile extension was not completed to Orange by July 1873, the railroad would forfeit its ownership of the line. After the Fredericksburg, Orange, and Charlottesville failed to bring the railroad to Orange by the specified time, the line was returned to the state and the Fredericksburg and Gordonsville name restored.

In 1876, the Fredericksburg and Gordonsville Railroad was renamed as the Potomac, Fredericksburg, and Piedmont Railroad. The new PF&P railroad was soon thereafter sold to the Royal Land Company of Virginia, which had in the same year purchased over 150,000 acres of coal, iron, and timber tracts in Virginia and West Virginia. The company planned to use the PF&P, which would be extended westward from Orange by the Shenandoah Valley and Ohio Railroad, to transport these resources eastward.

The Shenandoah Valley and Ohio Railroad was planned to construct a rail line from Orange, the western terminus of the PF&P, across Swift Run Gap into the Shenandoah Valley. The total cost of the 93-mile-long Shenandoah Valley and Ohio Railroad was projected to be $970,500, including depots and sidings. The PF&P's track was narrow gauged to 3 ft (914 mm) and was extended to Orange by early 1877, a distance of 38 miles from Fredericksburg, the eastern terminus of the line. The use of 3 ft (914 mm) narrow gauge instead of standard gauge allowed for a savings of 40%, and because of this, the company switched the original plans for the Shenandoah Valley and Ohio Railroad from standard gauge to the more cost-effective narrow gauge. Although the Royal Land Company had planned to extend the line from Mathias' Point (27 miles east of Fredericksburg on the Potomac River) to somewhere near Harrisonburg, Virginia, it failed to build beyond Orange to the west and Fredericksburg to the east. The cost of the 38-mile section that was actually constructed was $956,425.83, and since the Shenandoah Valley and Ohio Railroad never came to fruition, its projected costs were not realized.

The previous owners of the railroad regained control in 1878, and continued operations hauling mainly timber eastward. The railroad operated until 1925, when it was sold to the Orange and Fredericksburg Railroad Company after facing financial difficulties. In 1926, the line was standard gauged and was renamed as the Virginia Central Railway (not to be confused with the Virginia Central Railroad) in November of the same year. The entire line except for a 1-mile section in Fredericksburg was abandoned in 1937. The small section of the line remaining still operated under the Virginia Central Railway name until 1983.

During the railroad's operation as the Potomac, Fredericksburg, and Piedmont, it came to be called by locals the "Poor Folks and Preachers" railroad. This nickname arose as a corruption of the line's initials reflecting its passenger clientele.

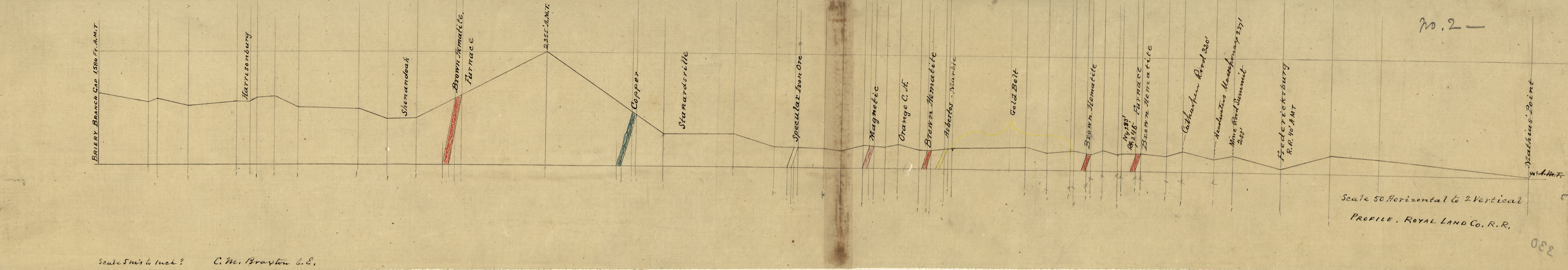
Profile Map of the Royal Land Company of Virginia's holdings and the PF&P between Fredericksburg and Orange. The company's Shenandoah Valley and Ohio Railroad would have been constructed from Orange Court House (center of map) to a point near Harrisonburg (left-side of map).

=== Virginia Central Railway Trail ===
In 2007, the railbed was identified as a potential greenway and multi-use trail. Sometime prior to 2008 a 2.1 mile section of the railbed between Salem Church Road and Gordon Road was converted to railtrail and called the Virginia Central Railway Bicycle Trail. In 2012, Fredericksburg and Spotsylvania County came up with plans to convert the 17 miles of railbed across the two jurisdictions into a single trail. The first and second sections of the trail in Fredericksburg, from Cobblestone near the train station to the intersection of Lafayette Boulevard and the Blue and Gray Parkway opened on September 20, 2014. The third section extended it west across Jefferson Davis highway, into Spotsylvania County and back across Hazel Run to a connection with the Idelwild neighborhood via the Blue Trail. It opened in August 2015, bringing the length in Fredericksburg to 4.5 miles.

== Operations ==
Although the Potomac, Fredericksburg, and Piedmont Railroad suffered numerous financial difficulties over its history, the line was able to become profitable as a common carrier. The 1902 railroad commissioner report lists a profit of about $13,000 with $28,515.52 in freight revenue and $8,437.77 in passenger revenue. Since the Royal Land Company's plans to build the railroad westward to tap the coal and iron deposits in the Shenandoah Valley fell through, these commodities did not account for a significant portion of the PF&P's freight revenue. By far the most significant commodity was lumber, accounting for 64% of the line's freight revenue in 1902. Following lumber were wood and bark at 12%, fertilizers at 7%, and grain at 4.5%, with various other commodities composing the rest. The railroad owned two locomotives in 1902, along with three passenger cars, 12 box cars, and 28 flat cars.
