= Jane Randolph Jefferson =

Thomas Jefferson's mother (1721–1776)

- Born: Jane Randolph; February 10, 1720 (Note: There are numerous days of birth and baptismal dates for Jane. Some sources, such as Monticello state that she was born on February 9, 1720. Other sources just state that she was born in the month of February, the 9th, or the 20th. The 20th is also used as her baptismal date, but her Baptismal record at St Paul's Church, Shadwell states that she was baptized on February 25, 1720 and was 15 days old on that date, making her date of birth February 10th.); Shadwell, near London, The Kingdom of Great Britain
- Died: March 31, 1776 (aged 56); Shadwell, Virginia, British America
- Resting place: Monticello, Albemarle County, Virginia
- Spouses: Peter Jefferson (m. 1739; died 1757)
- Children: 10, including Thomas, Lucy and Randolph
- Parent(s): Isham Randolph; Jane Rogers

Jane Randolph Jefferson (February 10, 1720 – March 31, 1776) was the wife of Peter Jefferson and the mother of US president Thomas Jefferson. Born in the parish of Shadwell, near London, she was the daughter of Isham Randolph, a ship's captain and a planter. Jefferson was proud of her heritage and brought customs of aristocracy to her family. Jefferson was revered within her family's household and positively influenced her son, Thomas Jefferson.

== Early life and education ==
Jane Randolph was born on February 10, 1720, at Shakspear Walk, (Note: The spelling varies.) in Shadwell, then a maritime village about a mile east of the Tower of London. (Note: The Shakspears, who credibly claimed to be related to William Shakespeare, were a prominent local family who owned a ropewalk — hence the name. Shakspear Walk was dug up in the 19th century to make the Shadwell Basin of the London Docks.) She was the daughter of Isham Randolph, a mariner and planter born in Virginia, and his wife Jane Rogers, who were married in St Botolph-without-Bishopsgate, London in 1717. The Randolphs lived in London and at Randolph's estate in Goochland County, Virginia.

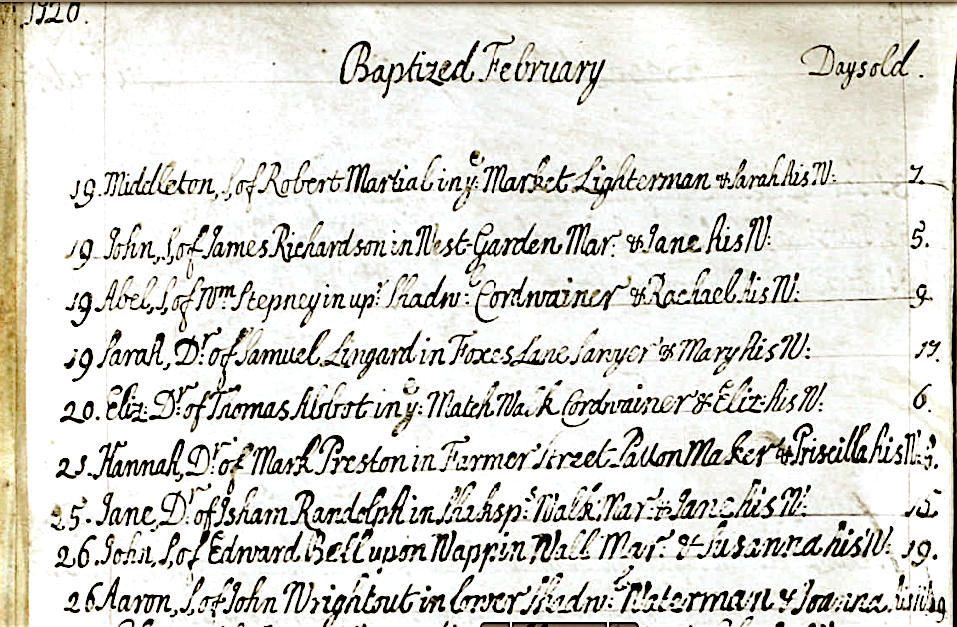
1

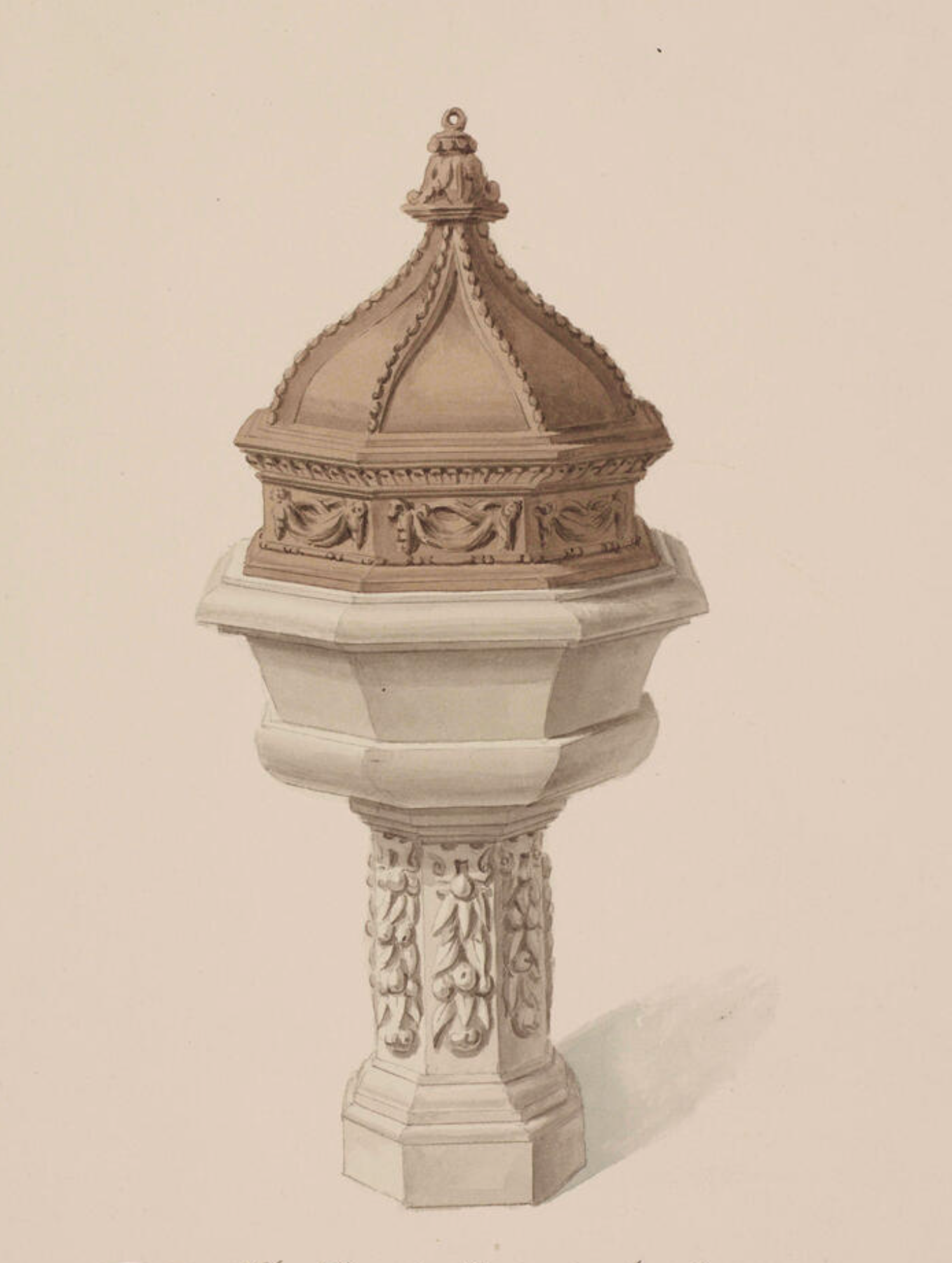
2

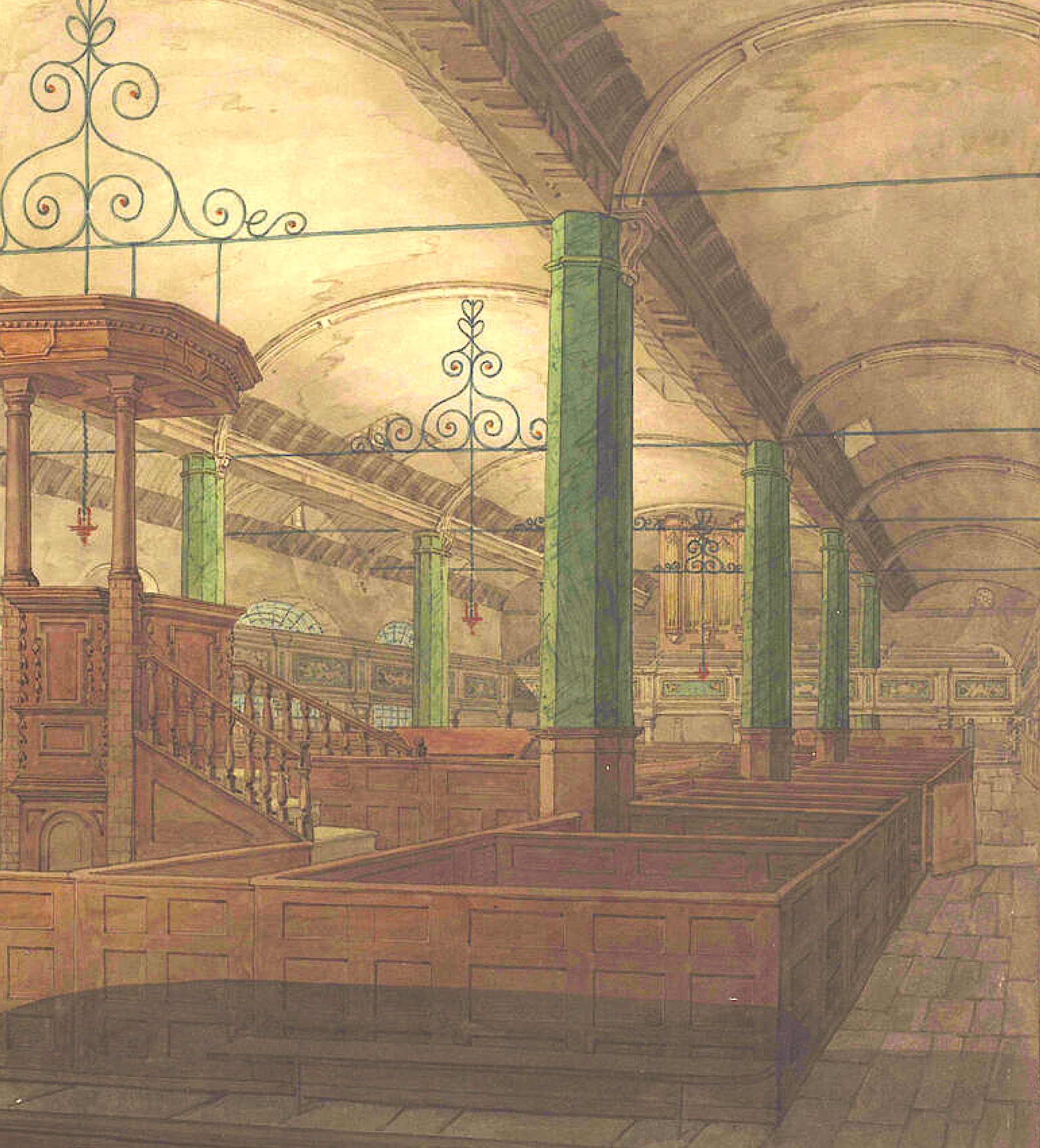
3

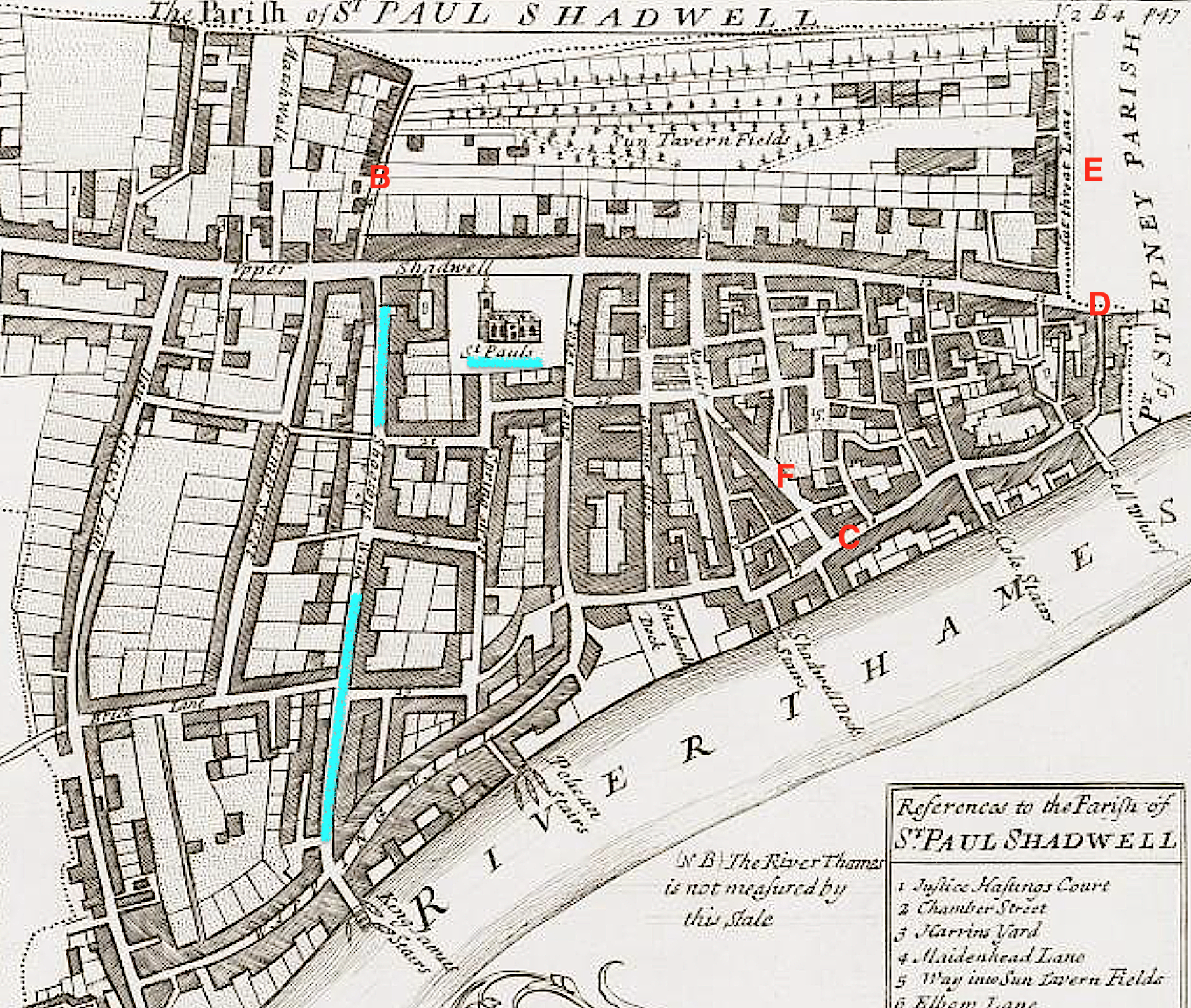
4
1. Baptism record showing she was baptised at St Paul's, Shadwell on February 25, 1720, aged 15 days, the daughter of Isham Randolph of Shakspear Walk, mariner and Jane, his wife.
2. The font where Jane was baptised, painted in about 1810.
3. St Paul, Shadwell as it still was in about 1800. The only church in the London area to have been founded while England was a republic, its interior reflects the Puritan style, influenced by Dutch Calvinism. Many sea captains are buried in the churchyard.
4. The hamlet of Shadwell at the time of Jane Randolph's birth. The street where she was born and her church are marked blue. Forthright place names echo the rumbustious maritime environment: B. Maidenhead Lane C. Codpeic [codpiece] Row D. Cock Hill E. Cut throat Lane. F. Labour in Vain Street.

The Randolphs lived in Virginia by October 1725, when Jane's sister, Mary, was born in Williamsburg. As was common in the eighteenth century, she received her education entirely at home. Jane was the oldest of eight children and was raised in the Anglican faith. (Note: Jane Randolph Jefferson was a first cousin of Peyton Randolph and aunt of Edmund Randolph. She had an older brother, Isham, born two streets away in 1718, who died shortly after his baptism.) The Randolph family was described by a merchant in 1737 as a "very gentle, well-dressed people."

== Marriage and family ==
Randolph married Peter Jefferson in Goochland County, Virginia on October 3, 1739. More specifically, she may have been married at her father's plantation, Dungeness. For a year or two following her marriage, the couple lived at Peter's plantation and house, Fine Creek Manor. in present-day Powhatan County, Virginia, near Fine Creek. (It is now part of Fine Creek Mills Historic District.) In 1741 or 1742, they established a home along the Rivanna River, which they named Shadwell, after her London birthplace. In 1745, they moved to Tuckahoe Plantation, upon the death of William Randolph, a widower and Jane's cousin, to raise the Randolph children. The Jeffersons returned to Shadwell in 1752 when Thomas Mann Randolph came of age.

Jane and Peter offered a privileged life for their family whether in established areas of eastern Virginia or, later, as they settled in the Shadwell plantation of the Piedmont. They ate on fine dishware, frequently entertained, enjoyed classic books and music, and attended dances. The family was considered prosperous and cultured. While Thomas Jefferson rarely mentioned his mother, much is known of her from extant records, including public records and inscribed family bibles. She was particularly known for her ability to manage the family's finances.

Jane Randolph Jefferson… possessed fine intellectual gifts, and was considered well educated for those days, comparing favorably with other Southern ladies occupying the same rank in society. She was a notable housekeeper, and had an exceedingly amiable and affectionate disposition.

— William Judson Hampton, Our Presidents and Their Mothers

Peter died in 1757 at Shadwell, after which Jane inherited the Shadwell plantation and house. Jane managed the affairs of the household and raised her eight surviving children. The children ranged in age between 17 years and 22 months of age, the eldest a daughter and the youngest were a set of twins. Thomas, the eldest son, became the "man of the house" and assumed his father's business responsibilities. At the time of Peter's death, the estate included 2,750 acres, 66 slaves, and a staff that included hired laborers.

In 1770, the main house at Shadwell was destroyed in a fire, and Jane had a smaller house built as a replacement. Thomas lived at Shadwell (Note: He lived at Shadwell until age 27, except for the period in which he was at college and studied law.) until the fire, at which time he removed to Monticello. By 1773, Thomas had taken responsibility for settling Jane's debts. Unable to reimburse him, she provided Thomas with deeds to her remaining slaves. Her health declined, requiring a number of visits by physicians and periodic convalescence with Thomas and Martha at Monticello. Her final years were lived under the strain of the American Revolutionary War. She died suddenly due to apoplexy on March 31, 1776. She was 56. Jane was buried in the Monticello family graveyard. (Note: Her place of death is unclear. She may have died at Shadwell, where she resided until her death or at Monticello, where she would convalesce when needed and as recorded on her tombstone installed in the 19th century.)

=== Children ===
Jane had the following children:

- Jane Jefferson (1740–1765) – close to her brother Thomas, she died unmarried at age 25.
- Mary Jefferson Bolling (1741–1803) – her husband John Bolling III served in the Virginia House of Burgesses.
- Thomas Jefferson (1743–1826), third president of the United States, married Martha Wayles Skelton.
- Elizabeth Jefferson (1744–1774), died unmarried.
- Martha Jefferson Carr (1746–1811) – her husband Dabney Carr, Thomas Jefferson's best friend and a member of the Virginia House of Burgesses, helped launch the intercolonial Committee of Correspondence in Virginia in March 1773.
- Peter Field Jefferson (1748) – died as an infant.
- unnamed son (1750) – died as an infant.
- Lucy Jefferson Lewis (1752–1810), married Charles Lilburn Lewis.
- Anne Scott Jefferson Marks (1755–1828) – twin of Randolph, married Hastings Marks.
- Randolph Jefferson (1755–1815) – twin of Anna Scott, married Anne Lewis, later Mitchie Ballow Pryor.

=== Relationship with Thomas ===
Over time, speculation arose regarding the nature of Thomas Jefferson's relationship with his mother. Some look to the lack of remaining correspondence with his mother to mean that there was a lack of affection for his mother. Yet, Jefferson did not retain correspondence with many people important to him, such as his wife and best friend. There is evidence that Jane was "revered" in family remembrances and 19th century biographers. Author William Judson Hampton and others credited Jane for her son's success as a statesman and his writing abilities. She also instilled in her son her love of music and the finer things of life, as well as her religious beliefs. Jon Meacham finds that Thomas lived with his mother at Shadwell "long into Jefferson's adulthood" to indicate his affection for his mother. He did not move to Monticello until the main house at Shadwell was destroyed in a fire. His first daughter was named Martha, and his second daughter was named Jane Randolph Jefferson for his mother.

== Ancestry ==
Ancestor William Randolph established the Randolph family in Virginia. He established a residence at Turkey Island and his descendants included General Robert E. Lee and Mary Isham Randolph, the grandmother of Chief Justice John Marshall (1755 – 1835). Jefferson, said by historian Jon Meacham to have been proud of her British heritage, descended from gentry of England and Scotland, said to include the "powerful Scot Earls of Murray" (also spelled Moray). The Randolph family traced their heritage to Lord Regent of Scotland Thomas Randolph, 1st Earl of Moray of the 14th century.
