= Randolph Jefferson =

Brother of President Thomas Jefferson (1755–1815)

- Born: October 1, 1755
- Died: August 7, 1815 (aged 59)
- Known for: younger brother of Thomas Jefferson
- Spouse(s): Anne Lewis (m. 1781; death 1799) Mitchie Ballow Pryor (m. 1809)
- Children: Thomas; Robert; Peter; Isham; James; Anna; Edwin; John
- Parents: Peter Jefferson (father); Jane Randolph (mother)

Randolph Jefferson (October 1, 1755 – August 7, 1815) was the younger brother of Thomas Jefferson, the only male sibling to survive infancy. He was a planter and owner of the Snowden plantation that he inherited from his father. He served the local militia for about ten years, making captain of the local militia in 1794. He also served during the Revolutionary War.

Randolph, known as "Uncle Randolph" when he visited Monticello, has been considered as a candidate for the father of Sally Hemings's children following DNA studies that found that the Hemings children descended from the Jefferson line. The theory that Randolph Jefferson fathered Hemings' children is not affirmed by the Thomas Jefferson Foundation, nor by most scholars of Jefferson. The Monticello Jefferson-Hemings Report (2000) determined that Thomas Jefferson was the likely father of Sally Hemings' children, though other scholars nonetheless contend Randolph is a strong candidate for paternity.

== Early life ==
Born at Shadwell, the Jefferson family plantation in Albemarle County, Virginia, his parents were Peter Jefferson, who died when Randolph was two years old, and Jane Randolph Jefferson. He was a twin to Anne Scott Jefferson and the only male sibling of Thomas Jefferson's to survive infancy. The twins were Thomas' youngest siblings, about 13 years younger than him. After Peter Jefferson's death, and while Randolph was a child, his affairs were managed by John Harvie Sr., the executor of Peter Jefferson's estate. After he died, his brother Thomas managed his affairs, such as his education and property, until he came of age in 1776. He assisted in management of his younger brother's affairs after 1776.

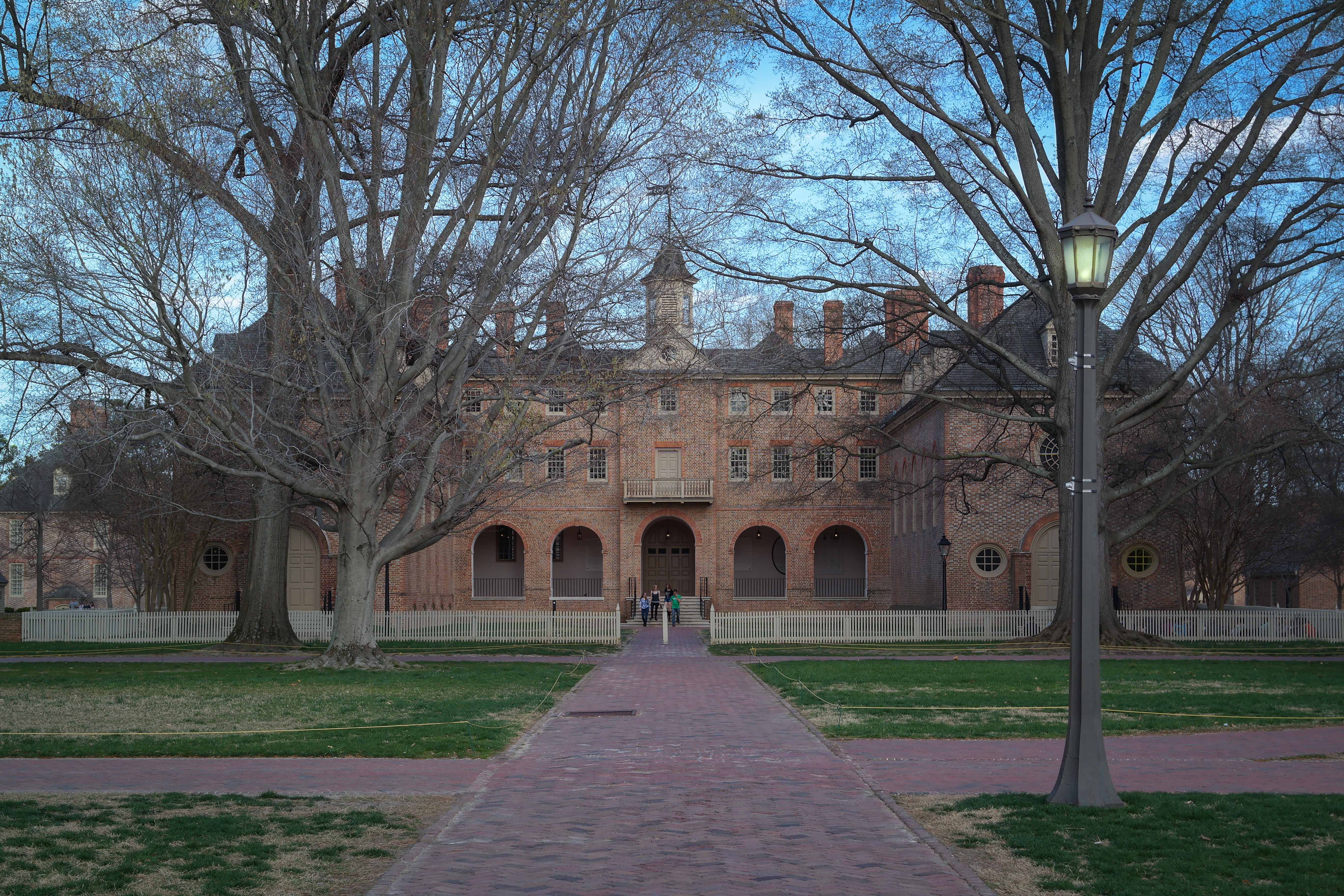
Wren Building, College of William & Mary; with a construction history dating back to 1695, it is part of the college's ancient campus

In 1764 and 1765, Randolph Jefferson studied with Ben Snead at the residence of his uncle Charles Lewis, Jr. and aunt Mary Randolph Lewis at Buck Island, which was a 960-acre tract located near Monticello and the Rivanna River in Albemarle County. He lived again at Shadwell with his mother in 1769, when he was taught by Patrick Morton. In 1770, the main house at Shadwell was destroyed in a fire, and his mother, Jane Randolph Jefferson, had a house built there as a replacement. He left Shadwell for Williamsburg when he was 16 to reside and study at the College of William & Mary from October 1771 until September 1772. He attended The Grammar School at the College of William & Mary and was tutored in higher subjects by Thomas Gwatkin, who taught mathematics and natural philosophy at the college. Additionally, he took violin lessons from Frances Alberti, as did his brother. Randolph Jefferson continued to “fiddle” throughout his life and willed his violin to his son, Robert Lewis Jefferson.

== Description ==
Thomas Jefferson described Randolph posthumously in a deposition that was taken as Randolph's sons contested the will that favored their stepmother, Mitchie Pryor Jefferson. Thomas was considerate and affectionate toward Randolph; they addressed each other as "Dear Brother," and exchanged visits and services with each other. Letters document that Thomas lent Randolph the harness for a gig, had his watch repaired, gave him a dog, sent him vegetable seeds, and gave him a spinning jenny. At Monticello, he was called "Uncle Randolph". A former Monticello enslaved man, Isaac Jefferson, recalled in 1847 that Randolph "used to come out among black people, play the fiddle and dance half the night..."

Historian Dumas Malone states that Randolph did not share his older brother's eloquence. His letters to Thomas show a disregard of grammar and the use of colloquialisms such as "tech" instead of "touch." His "rustic sense of humor" may have caused people to underestimate his intelligence, yet he lacked his brother's intellectual curiosity.

== Military service ==
In 1776, Randolph Jefferson served in Captain Wingfield's Company of the Albemarle militia. He served with William Fossett and Joseph Nielson who had worked at Monticello and had live-in relationships with members of the Hemings family. (Note: Joseph Nelson or Nielson, a white carpenter who worked at Monticello, fathered some of Betty Hemings children. William Fossett is believed to be the father of Joseph Fossett (1780–1858). William was a white craftsman at Monticello.) He was a member of the local militia in 1779.

Along with his brother, Jefferson signed an Oath of Allegiance to the Commonwealth of Virginia in 1777, He, his brother, and Charles Lewis also signed the Albemarle County Oath of Allegiance to the Commonwealth on April 21, 1779. It was also called the Albemarle Declaration of Independence.

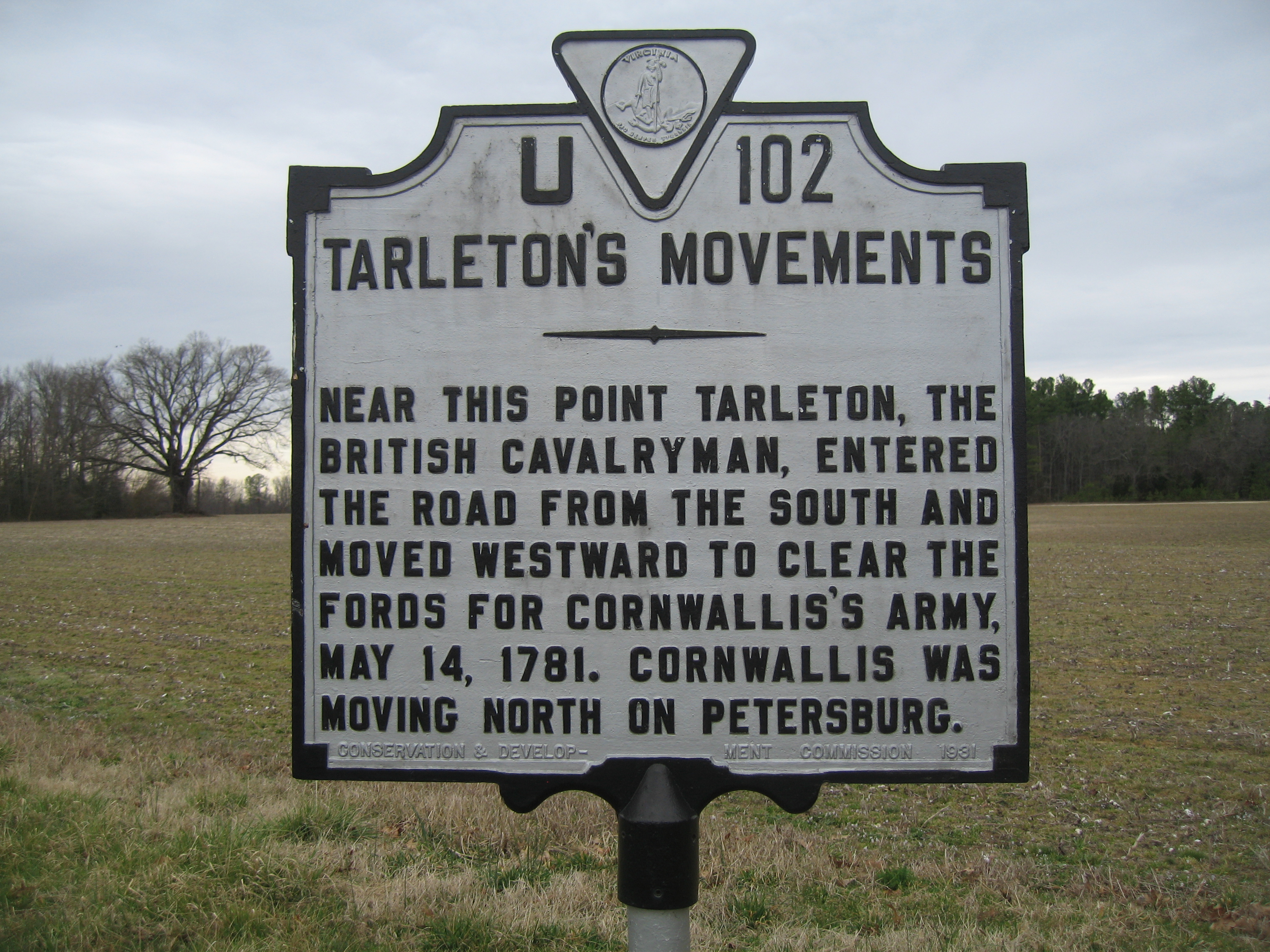
Banastre Tarleton's Movements historical marker in Adams Grove, Virginia

During the Revolutionary War (1775–1783), he served under General Thomas Nelson with the Virginia Light Dragoons. In the fight against Tarleton, in the summer of 1781, he provided provisions for the Virginia troops, volunteered a slave from Snowden to help move items from military stores at Scotts Ferry in Albemarle County to Bedford County, and allowed the 3rd Regiment of Light Dragoons to camp at Snowden for over a month and a half.

Following the war, Jefferson served in the Buckingham County Militia, achieving the rank of Lieutenant in 1787 and, in 1794, was recommended to rank of Captain. After at least nine years of service in the Militia, Randolph's reason for not continuing remains a mystery. He was content to enjoy the title of Captain the remainder of his life.

== Plantation owner ==
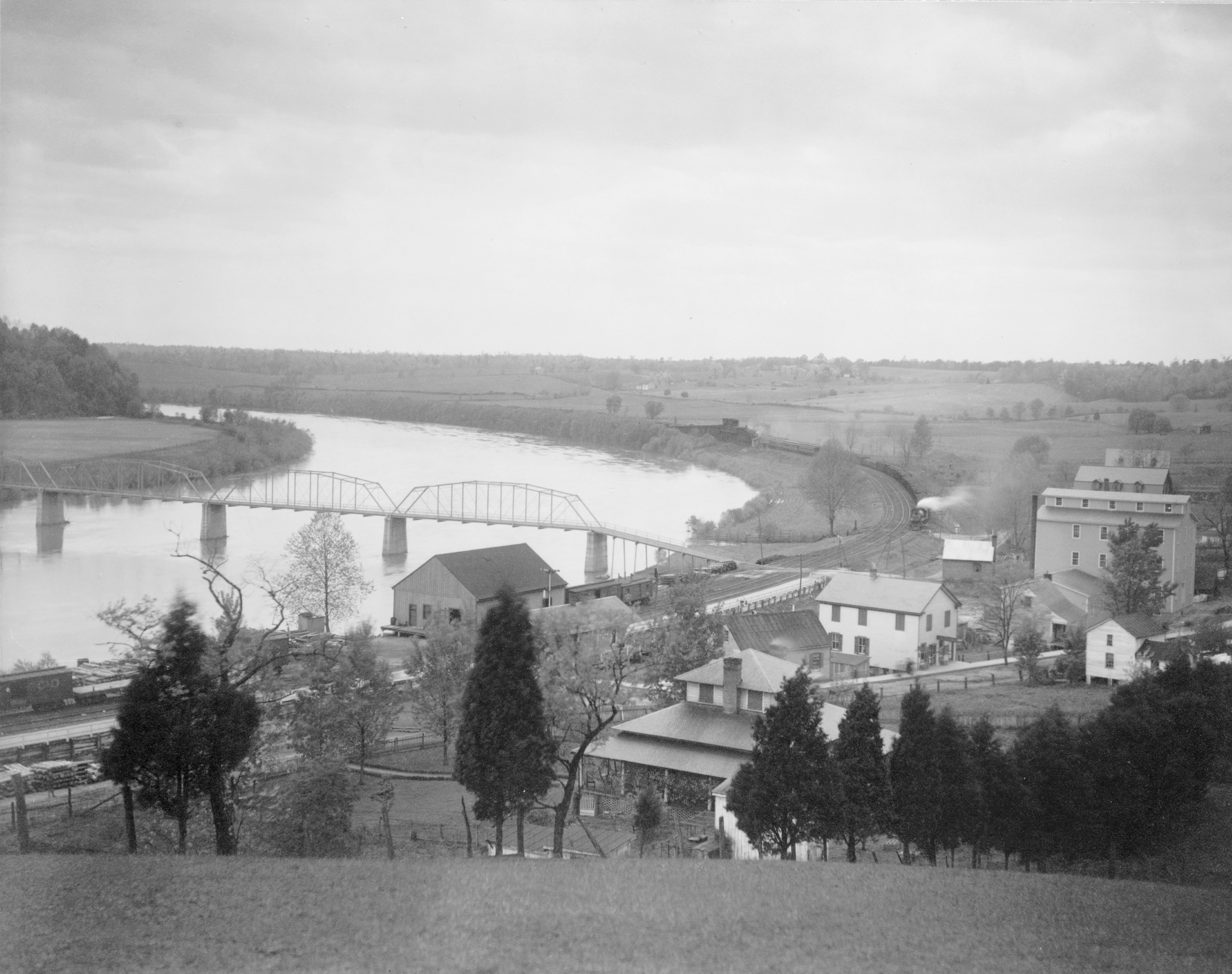
View from hillside of Old Scott's Ferry, Scottsville, Virginia, showing train approaching railroad bridge, 1911, Library of Congress

In 1776, Randolph inherited the Snowden plantation in Buckingham County, Virginia. (Note: Family tradition was that his first American ancestor arrived in Virginia from Wales, near Snowdon mountain. (Peter Jefferson named the plantation along the James River 'Snowden' for this family story.) No records have been found, though, that state that there were Jeffersons in the Snowdonia region in the 16th and early 17th centuries.) with 2,291 2/3 acres (927.4 ha) called "Fluvanna lands" located near the Hardware River and Scottsville, (Note: The number of acres vary based upon how long Randolph lived, reducing in number over the years. One source says the plantation was 1,300 acres.) from his father, Peter Jefferson's estate. More specifically, the plantation was located along the James River, about twenty miles south of Monticello and across from Scott's Ferry and on the south side of Horseshoe Bend. His life at Snowden was relatively simple compared to life at Monticello; however, he was an affluent planter and dependent on enslaved labor. He had 2,000 acres, 30 slaves, 6 horses, and 42 cattle in 1782. Months after Randolph's death, the dwelling house at Snowden burned to the ground. (Note: The house was to be rented out within a week. Mitchie moved from Snowden to her mother Susan B. Pryor's house within two days before the fire destroyed the house in 1815.) Ultimately, none of Randolph Jefferson's sons could afford to purchase Snowden from their father's estate and it was sold to Capt. John Harris of Albemarle County. Most of them, eventually settled nearby in Scottsville, Albemarle and Fluvanna County, Virginia.

== Marriage and family ==
On July 30, 1781, Jefferson married his first cousin, Anne Lewis, (Note: The year of marriage is also stated as 1780, but the original marriage records show that they were married on July 30, 1781 in Albemarle County.) the daughter of Colonel Charles Lewis of Buck Island and Mary Randolph, the sister of Jane Randolph Jefferson. (Note: Randolph's sister, Lucy, married Anne's brother, Charles Lilburn Lewis. Lucy's daughter, Mary Randolph, married Randolph's son, Thomas.) Isham Randolph of Dungeness was the grandfather of both Randolph Jefferson and Anne Jefferson Lewis. They had six children: Thomas, (Note: As a child, Thomas was a resident at Monticello for extended periods of schooling in 1799 and 1800, and possibly 1801. Thomas eventually married his first cousin, Mary Randolph Lewis, the daughter of Charles Lilburn Lewis of Monteagle.) Robert Lewis, Peter Field, Isham Randolph, James Lilburne and Anna Scott. Anna Scott Jefferson married Zachariah Nevil (d.1830), who represented Nelson County in the Virginia state legislature.

Randolph was a widower for about ten years after his wife died about 1799. He periodically suffered from ill health beginning in 1807, which precluded his ability to travel at times. Randolph remarried about 1809 to Mitchie Ballow Pryor of Buckingham County, who did not get along with her stepsons and convinced Randolph to favor her in a rewrite of his will that was dated May 28, 1808. Mitchie, whose father was David Pryor, was in her early twenties, perhaps not yet age 21, when she married Randolph, who was in his mid-50s. She created disruption within the Jefferson family, including communicating her concerns about Randolph's management of the Snowden estate with her brother-in-law, Thomas Jefferson. She was also prone to heavy spending, responsible for large bills with local merchants. She conceived a son named John before Randolph died at Snowden on August 17, 1815. Randolph suffered an illness in the Spring of 1815, but told his brother in June of that year that he was feeling fine and was involved in the wheat harvest. Randolph's sons and Thomas Jefferson tried to break Randolph's last will, which favored Mitchie. Mitchie and John then moved to Tennessee, where John died unmarried at age 29. Randolph's will called for his property to be sold and the funds divided up among his sons and his slaves were to stay with the family.

According to research done by descendants of Betty Brown Hemings, he is known to have fathered at least one child with a slave, her son Edwin Jefferson has been shown to have been fathered by him.

== Suggested paternity of Sally Hemings's children ==
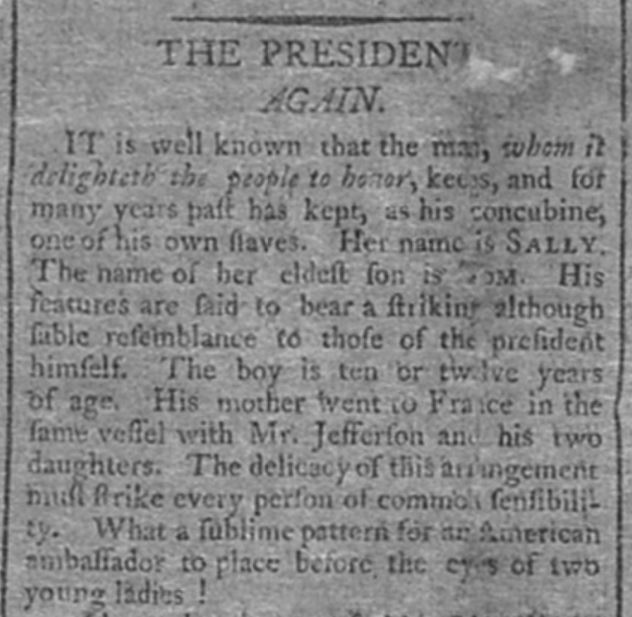
First paragraph of James T. Callender's newspaper editorial, titled "The President Again," which first exposed the purported relationship between Thomas Jefferson and Sally Hemings, one of Jefferson's teenaged slaves. September 1802.

The Jefferson–Hemings controversy concerns the question of whether U.S. President Thomas Jefferson was the father of the children of Sally Hemings, a mixed-race slave. Alternate theories suggest that Randolph Jefferson, or his nephew, Peter Carr, fathered the Hemings children. Carr, though, was ruled out in genetic testing — but there was a match to the Jefferson male line to descendants of Sally Hemings' son Eston.

The DNA study, published in Nature on November 5, 1998, titled Jefferson Fathered Slave's Last Child, led to speculation about whether Randolph was the Jefferson who fathered the Hemings children. The Thomas Jefferson Heritage Society, formed in 1999, commissioned its own independent scholars' report that was completed in 2001. The report suggested that Randolph Jefferson, or one of his sons, could have fathered Hemings's children, and 12 of 13 members of the commission scholar opinions range between "seriously skeptical" and "almost certainly not true" that Thomas Jefferson fathered Hemings' children. The other scholar of the 13 member commission states that Randolph's behavior makes him a likely suspect. (Note: The Monticello Jefferson-Hemings Report (2000) noted that Randolph made only four recorded visits to Monticello (in September 1802, September 1805, May 1808, and sometime in 1814); none is related to Sally Hemings's conceptions. In August 1807, a probable conception time for Eston Hemings, Thomas Jefferson wrote to his brother about visiting, but there is no evidence that the younger man arrived. Similarly, no documentation of Randolph visiting Monticello at the probable conception time for Madison Hemings. Some researchers documented that Randolph Jefferson was seldom at Monticello, except perhaps during the period when Hemings conceived Eston Hemings, but it is not clear that he visited as planned at that time. His sons were not at Monticello during most of the periods in which Hemings conceived her children. Hemings did not conceive children during the many absences of Thomas Jefferson from Monticello. Hemings said that "Jefferson" was the father of his children. William G. Hyland, Jr. asserts that Jefferson could refer to Randolph Jefferson, who lived 20 miles from Monticello and socialized with the slaves there. In addition, he had the same Y-DNA as his brother, Thomas. Eston Hemings family believed that their ancestor was a "Jefferson uncle". According to research conducted in the 1940s with Hemings descendants, Randolph Jefferson had fathered "colored children," which may have occurred before he married at the age of 26. Descendants of Edwin Jefferson, who was the son of Betty Brown Hemings and a slave at Monticello found compelling evidence that Edwin was fathered by Randolph Jefferson. Author Cynthia Burton researched Randolph and his sons and found that his sons were often at Monticello, and Isham Randolph Jefferson (1781-1852) lived at Monticello during his childhood. He was 15 at the birth of Heming's first child and 27 at the birth of her last child. However, there are no entries in Thomas Jefferson's record books for Isham. Robert Turner, a Jefferson scholar, suggests that the field of candidates for the father of Hemings's children increased when Thomas Jefferson returned home, when friends and relatives would visit Monticello to visit him. When Thomas was not at home, Monticello was locked up against visitors. According to the study of the paternity of Sally Hemings's children: "As mentioned elsewhere, no one familiar with Monticello suggested that Sally Hemings was promiscuous or that her children had multiple fathers.") Noting that Thomas Jefferson invited Randolph to Monticello 15 days before Eston's estimated date of conception, that an oral tradition among Eston's descendants identified their ancestor not as Thomas Jefferson, but rather as an "uncle" (at Monticello Randolph was called "Uncle Randolph"), that enslaved Monticello blacksmith Isaac Jefferson reported that Randolph socialized with the Monticello slaves, and that Randolph (a widower at the time of Eston's conception) was reported to have fathered children with other enslaved women, the 13-member Scholars' Commission chaired by University of Virginia Law School professor Robert F. Turner concluded in a report issued in April 2001, that Randolph was likely the father of Eston Hemings.

== See also ==
- Ancestry of Thomas Jefferson (also Randolph's ancestors)
