= Joshua Fry =

English-born planter, politician, colonial official and military officer

Member of the Virginia House of Burgesses representing Albemarle County
- In office February 1746 – 1754 Serving with Charles Lynch, Allen Howard
- Preceded by: n/a
- Succeeded by: Peter Jefferson

Personal details
- Born: 1699 Crewkerne, Somerset
- Died: 31 May 1754 (aged 54–55) Fort Cumberland, Maryland
- Spouse: Mary Micou
- Relatives: John Fry (son)
- Education: Oxford University
- Profession: Surveyor, professor, planter, politician

Colonel Joshua Fry (1699 – 31 May 1754) was an English-born planter, politician, colonial official and military officer who spent most of his life in the British colony of Virginia. Although he served several terms in the House of Burgesses, he may be best known as a surveyor and cartographer who collaborated with Peter Jefferson, the father of future U.S. president Thomas Jefferson. After Fry’s death on a military expedition, George Washington became commanding officer of the Virginia Regiment, a key unit in what became the French and Indian War.

== Early and family life ==
Born in Crewkerne, Somerset in 1699, Fry was educated at Oxford University, but sought his fortune in the colonies. In 1736 or 1737, he married the wealthy young widow Mary Micou Hill (1716-1772), who would survive him by nearly two decades. They had five children who grew to adulthood: John, Henry, Martha, William, and Margaret. John and Henry would briefly succeed their father representing Albemarle County in the House of Burgesses (1761-1765) and Henry may have also represented Culpeper County in the Virginia House of Delegates in 1785-1786 and introduced an unsuccessful Emancipation resolution before the creation of Madison County.

== From emigrant to planter ==
Fry emigrated from England to the British colony of Virginia about 1726. By 1739, he established a grammar school for sons of the local gentry, affiliated with the College of William and Mary in Williamsburg, which had received a royal charter in 1722. By 1732, Fry became the college's professor of mathematics and natural philosophy, and soon began a public career as justice of the peace of James City County.

When he married the widow of a local planter in Essex County, Fry resigned his teaching position and began operating what had been her plantation and its slaves. Fry also became the justice of the peace, sheriff and coroner of Essex County. Although some Virginia planters supported their families by selling products from their plantations, Fry mostly surveyed, bought and sold real estate.

== Albemarle county planter and official ==
Sometime before 1743 Fry and his growing family moved westward from Virginia's Tidewater Region to the Piedmont, where he bought land along the Hardware River in what was then called Goochland County and began establishing an 800-acre (3.2 km^{2}) plantation and building a house he called "Viewmont." As European settlement was moving westward, the colony's legislature was in the process of establishing Albemarle County from Goochland County, and commissioned Fry to establish the boundary. Fry's plantation was in the new county. He became its judge (supervising the justices of the peace as well as in effect the chief executive officer), as well as its official surveyor, and so often visited the new county seat at the horseshoe bend of the James River, later called Scottsville.

Albemarle County voters elected Fry to represent Albemarle County in the House of Burgesses several times between 1745 and his death in 1754. Fry also became the county's first lieutenant (colonel of the local militia). In addition, Fry continued to involve himself with affairs of the colony, with his surveys described below possibly securing his appointment a member of the governor's council in 1750.

The Fry-Jefferson map of Virginia (1752)

Meanwhile, various Virginia real estate speculators wanted the western lands surveyed, and in 1738 Fry and fellow surveyor Robert Brooke began petitioning the Virginia General Assembly to pay for surveys. The proposals went to committees, and were only formally rejected in 1744, when the legislators created Albemarle County, although they also agreed to pay Fry for a survey of the dividing line with the now-smaller Goochland County. In 1746, lieutenant governor William Gooch commissioned Fry and Peter Jefferson to survey the lands of Lord Fairfax in the Piedmont region. In 1749, the pair received another commission, to establish the boundary between North Carolina and Virginia. Beginning in 1749, Fry also became involved with the Loyal Company of Virginia, which received grants across the Appalachian Mountains conditioned upon surveys being made (on less strict terms than imposed on the rival Ohio Company, possibly because of investments of multiple burgesses in the venture).

In 1750, the English Board of Trade expressed interest in the colonial frontier. Acting governor Lewis Burwell commissioned Fry and Jefferson to survey the colony's disputed boundary with the Maryland colony (whose royal deed only extended to the Appalachian Mountains, whereas Virginia's had no explicit western boundary). Fry also prepared "An Account of the Bounds of the Colony of Virginia of its back Settlements of the lands toward the Mountains and Lakes" and included a handwritten copy of "A Brief Account of the Travels of John Peter Salley," which documented a 1742 expedition led by John Howard along the Ohio River to the Mississippi River. The manuscripts gained less renown than the detailed accompanying map, now called the Fry-Jefferson map.

In 1752 Fry accepted an appointment from Lieutenant Governor Robert Dinwiddie as one of the commissioners (with fellow burgesses Lunsford Lomax and James Patton also of the Loyal Company), and Christopher Gist of the Ohio Company to negotiate with the Native Americans to secure land west of the Appalachian mountains and south of the Ohio River. This expedition was also supposed to strengthen relations between the colonists and Native Americans, many of whom had contested the Treaty of Lancaster signed a decade earlier. While the Treaty of Logstown was signed at Logstown (near what later became Baden, Pennsylvania), giving the colonists claim to lands that later became Kentucky, it too would provoke controversy. It expressly allowed the British to build a fort at the Monongahela river about 18 miles downstream, but the French soon built Fort Duquesne nearby.

== Death and legacy ==
In the early days of what became the French and Indian War, Fry was named the Commander-in-Chief of colonial forces, and given command of the Virginia Regiment, with orders to capture Fort Duquesne. During the advance into the Ohio Country, Fry suddenly fell off his horse and died from his injuries on 31 May 1754 at Fort Cumberland, in the Maryland Colony. A young Virginia officer, George Washington, succeeded Fry in command of the regiment. James Innes of North Carolina briefly succeeded Fry as Commander-in-Chief.

Joshua Fry is buried in an unmarked grave within the Rose Hill Cemetery in Cumberland, Maryland. His widow would live her final years with their middle son Rev. Henry M. Fry and be buried at the Locust Hill graveyard in Madison County, Virginia. Peter Jefferson, to whom Fry bequeathed his surveying instruments, became the executor of his will and guardian of his youngest children. Several of Fry's sons and grandsons fought as patriots in the American Revolutionary War and continued westward into what became Kentucky and West Virginia. Philip Slaughter wrote a biography of Fry, which is available online. Viewmont, which Fry sold to his fellow burgess and Loyal Company surveyor, Dr. Thomas Walker and which Gov. Edmund Randolph later owned, was eventually abandoned and burned down in 1800 and 1940, but a new house was built with the same name of the site, incorporating massive chimneys which survived the fire. A historical marker honoring Joshua Fry was erected at the site in 1963.

== See also ==
- Great Britain in the Seven Years' War
- North Carolina–Tennessee–Virginia Corners
