= Charles Lilburn Lewis =

Plantation owner, one of the signers of Virginia's Declaration of Independence

- Born: 1747
- Died: 1831 or 1837
- Spouse: Lucy Jefferson (m. 1769)
- Children: 10, including Isham Lewis, Lilburne Lewis

Charles Lilburn Lewis (1747 – 1831 or 1837), sometimes referred to as Charles Lilburn Lewis of Monteagle, was one of the founders of Milton, Virginia, as well as one of the signers of Albemarle County, Virginia's Declaration of Independence in 1779. Married to Lucy Jefferson, the sister of President Thomas Jefferson, he was among the elite class of plantation owners until the turn of the 19th century when he and his children lost their fortunes. Two of his daughters were married and stayed in Virginia, while the remainder of his family left for Kentucky. They had a difficult life there, with his wife, son Randolph, daughter-in-law Mary, and Lilburne's wife having died by early 1812. Lewis was left to care for unmarried daughters, grandchildren, and the family's slaves. Sons Isham and Lilburne brutally murdered an enslaved boy named George in December 1811. After it was determined that the men were involved, Lilburne killed himself and Isham escaped jail and died following his service in the Battle of New Orleans in 1815.

== Early life ==
Charles Lilburn Lewis was the oldest of eight children born to Colonel Charles Lewis of Buck Island (Note: Lewis' grandfather was known as Colonel Charles Lewis of The Byrd.) and Mary Randolph. His maternal aunt, Jane Randolph Jefferson, was the mother of United States President Thomas Jefferson. The Lewis family were among the wealthy plantation and slave–owning class. His Jefferson cousins, except Thomas, were educated with him at Buck Island, around eight miles from Charlottesville, Virginia. (Note: Thomas Jefferson, though, received a classic and advanced education, which took him away from the Shadwell and Buck Island area. Thomas' brother, Randolph, boarded with the Lewis family while schooled with their children. Thomas had only occasional contact with the Lewis family during his childhood. Jefferson was on warm terms with his aunt, Mary Randolph Lewis, and his sister, Lucy, but only cordial and increasingly reserved with brother-in-law Charles Lilburn Lewis over the years. In a business letter, Jefferson stated that Lewis was not to be depended upon. In the end, Jefferson needed to sue Lewis for unpaid monies when Lewis was rich. Later, Lewis had financial troubles and Jefferson offered to assume Lewis's debt of another business transaction.) They were close throughout their lives and three generations of Jefferson and Lewis family members intermarried.

There is no indication that Charles had an advanced education, but beginning at the age of 16, he learned about the affairs of running a plantation and other business affairs from his father. The Lewises periodically borrowed books from Thomas Jefferson's library.

== Marriage and children ==
On September 12, 1769, Lewis married his first cousin, Lucy Jefferson, President Jefferson's sister. After their wedding, they lived in a two-story log cabin on a portion of the Buck Island plantation that was south of the Rivanna River.

The couple had eight or nine children, including son Charles:

- Randolph married his cousin Mary Howell Lewis in 1790. They had eight children. Randolph died in 1809.
- Isham, with his brother Lilburn, perpetrated the murder of Slave George. He was said by Sorley to have died in 1815.
- Jane Jefferson (1777–1822) married in 1795 to Craven Peyton, with whom she had five children.
- Lilburne married Jane Woodson, with whom he had five children. They moved to Kentucky and settled near Smithland. Jane died in 1811. Lilburne then married Letitia Rutter of a prominent Livingston County, Kentucky family. They had one child. Lilburn killed himself in 1812 after his role in brutally killing an enslaved young man named George.
- Mary Randolph married Randolph Jefferson's son, Thomas, on October 3, 1808.
- Lucy B. (September 24, 1789 – July 14, 1864) married Washington A. Griffin in 1813. They lived near Shelbyville, Kentucky and had nine children.
- Martha married William Monroe of New Orleans, Louisiana.
- Ann M. (Nancy) died unmarried
- Charles, one of the two youngest sons, was given 650 acres of land along the Rivanna River by his father in 1802, which he sold in 1804 to Craven Peyton and spent the money. He received a commission as lieutenant in the U.S. Army by his uncle, Thomas Jefferson. (Note: In 1804, a dispute ensued. The land was given to him for his lifetime, and if he did not marry would go to his sisters. There were two deeds for a sale of the land to Craven Peyton, one between Charles Lewis and Peyton showing a sale for 1,500 pounds dated July 18, 1804. Another, dated September 29, 1804 was between Charles L. Lewis and Lucy Lewis conveying the land for 1,500 pounds.) He fathered a mulatto girl, Matilda Lewis, about 1804 with a slave owned by his brother Randolph. Charles died in April 1806 while serving in the military.
- Elizabeth Lewis, died in 1806.

Most of the family moved to Kentucky by 1808.

== Career ==
During the Revolutionary War, Lewis joined his father in signing a declaration of independence of the citizens of Albemarle County. Charles and his brother Isham joined the Continental Army company with their neighbor, Dr. George Gilmore, who was a lieutenant. Their uniform was a hunting shirt. Lewis became a lieutenant and by August 1782 he had achieved the rank of colonel. Lewis also served on the Albemarle jury in 1785.

A prosperous plantation owner, he had thousands of acres and several farms. In 1782 Lewis inherited 1500 acres and other property from his father's estate, on which he built a large new home on a bluff overlooking the river; he named the estate Monteagle or Mt. Eagle. (Note: According to Sorely, the estate was located on approximately 1,510 acres of land willed to him by his father who died in 1782.) Monteagle then became the family residence.

By 1806, Lewis had lost his fortune due to a number of agricultural losses, and perhaps poor management. According to Boynton Merrill Jr. in Jefferson's Nephews: A Frontier Tragedy, Lewis had fallen on hard times at the end of the 18th century and was forced to sell his land and slaves. His two youngest sons failed financially, too. Son Charles had sold the land given to him by his father, and spent the money. In 1806, though, Thomas Jefferson gave Charles a commission of lieutenant in the Army. In his letter of thanks to Jefferson, he said "however thoughtless I may have been heretofore, it shall be my constant study so long as I continue in the U.S. service, to do that which will be most to my interest, and the interest of those by whom I have been promoted".

Isham had also received land, a portion of the Buck Island plantation, and lost it. Isham wrote to his uncle Thomas Jefferson in April 1809 looking for assistance in getting a start on adult life. He complained that his father had not trained him “in any useful pursuit” and had not fulfilled his “promises of wealth”. Jefferson offered to teach him surveying, which would allow him the opportunity “of doing something for yourself”. After two weeks of instruction at Monticello, Jefferson gave him two letters of introduction to secure a surveying position. After visiting his family in Kentucky, Isham went looking for work in Natchez but soon returned to his family.

== Migration to Kentucky ==
The grown sons Randolph and Lilburn moved with their families to Livingston County, Kentucky from Albemarle County, Virginia in 1806. Randolph and Lilburn purchased large tracts of land along the Ohio River near Smithland, Kentucky, and Lilburn built his home, "Rocky Hill", on a high point in the center of a 1,000-acre farm.

Charles and Mary followed with their three unmarried daughters by 1808. (Note: According to Sorley, Jane and Mary did not move to Kentucky; therefore, the three daughters were likely Lucy B., Martha, and Ann (Nancy).) There were 21 Lewis family members and 24 slaves for a total of 45 people who moved to Kentucky. The 21 Lewis family members included 12 children, three unmarried daughters of Charles and Lucy, and six adults. (Note: Isham, with no property and no job, likely followed the Lewises to Kentucky, but it was probably a short visit. He went to St. Louis to inquire about a position of his cousin Meriwether Lewis, who was the governor of Upper Louisiana, but he was not given a job and returned to Albemarle County, Virginia.) When they arrived, life was difficult due to the fear of attack by Native Americans, shortage of coins for purchases, and a severe depression. Family members suffered from recurring malaria and other health problems. Lewis and his sons Lilburne and Randolph became "land poor. They struggled financially and were the subject of lawsuits. The land, located near the mouth of the Cumberland River and along the Ohio River, was wild. The family "did not flourish".

Isham had "appeared at Rocky Hill for a visit of undetermined length" in 1811 after his mother, Lucy, had died. Like his brother, Isham developed a drinking problem. Randolph and his wife had also died, as had Lilburne's first wife Elizabeth. With five children to raise, Lilburne had remarried Letitia Rutter.

After the death of his first wife, Lilburne became a heavy drinker and in financial ruin.

=== Murder of Slave George ===
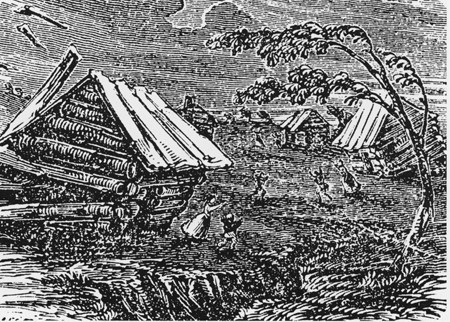
Early depiction of the effects of the December 1811 New Madrid earthquake

On December 15, 1811, Lilburn and Isham had been drinking. The brothers brutally murdered Lilburne's 17-year-old slave named "George", who had dropped and broken a pitcher of their mother's, with an axe in front of their other slaves. Lilburne warned his slaves that this is the treatment that they would receive for disobeying him or telling anyone about their murdering George. One of the enslaved man was forced to dismember George and put his remains in the fire. That night, the first New Madrid earthquake struck the region. The brothers tried to hide the remains of George, but his body was revealed two months later, when a chimney collapsed in one of the major aftershocks. The brothers were arrested and charged with the murder. The murder was not discovered for three months when a dog unearthed a part of George's remains and which was seen by a neighbor. Lilburne and Isham were indicted by a grand jury, the trial was delayed for three months and they returned to Rocky Hill to await the court dates.

In 1953, Robert Penn Warren published a lengthy poem entitled Brother to Dragon: A Tale in Verse and Voices that retells the story of the Lewis family and the murder of George.

== Later years, aftermath of the murder, and death ==
In 1812, the 59-year-old Lewis was the only adult of the six adult family members who remained and he still had his unmarried daughters and grandchildren to care for. They still had their slaves. Lucy died in 1811. Randolph and his wife Mary had died. Afraid for her life, Lilburne's wife Letitia took her newborn baby and moved to her father's house in Salem, Kentucky. (Note: Letitia later married Christopher G. Houts, who was made guardian of her son, James Rutter Lewis, in 1815. The Houts moved to New Madrid County, Missouri. When Lilburne's estate was settled in 1813, Letitia received four slaves.) After the murder of George, Lilburne killed himself during a double-suicide attempt with his brother. Isham was considered an accomplice to the suicide and was put in jail. After 23 days, he escaped and was said to have gone to Natchez where he was married. He fought in the Battle of New Orleans and died in 1815.

Lewis struggled to help his grandchildren. After Lilburne's death in 1812, the court appointed guardians for his children. Two of Lilburne's children died before his estate was settled. Charles Lilburne Lewis died in Livingston County.

Charles Lewis was a member of the Society of the Cincinnati of the State of Virginia.

== Ancestry ==
Ancestors of Charles Lilburn Lewis

16. Robert Lewis
8. John Lewis
17. Isabelle Warner
4. Charles Lewis
18. Augustine Warner Jr.
9. Elizabeth Warner
19. Mildred Reade
2. Charles Lewis
10. Sir John Howell
5. Mary Howell
1. Charles Lilburn Lewis
24. Richard Randolph
12. William Randolph
25. Elizabeth Ryland
6. Isham Randolph
26. Henry Isham
13. Mary Isham
27. Catherine Banks
3. Mary Randolph
28. Thomas Rogers
14. Charles Rogers
29. Elizabeth Snow
7. Jane Rogers
30. William Lilburn
15. Jane Lilburn
31. Elizabeth Nicholson
