= Jefferson–Hemings controversy =

Historical debate

The Jefferson–Hemings controversy is a historical debate over whether there was a sexual relationship between the widowed Thomas Jefferson and his much younger slave and sister-in-law, Sally Hemings, and whether he fathered some or all of her six recorded children. For more than 150 years, most historians denied rumors that he had sex with a slave. Based on his grandson Thomas Jefferson Randolph's report, they said that one of his nephews had been the father of Hemings's children. The opinion of historians began to shift in the second half of the 20th century, and by the 21st century and after DNA tests of descendants, most historians agree that Jefferson was the father of one or more of Sally's children.

In the 1850s, Randolph told the historian Henry Randall that the late Peter Carr, a married nephew of Jefferson's (a son of his sister), had fathered Hemings's children. Randolph asked Randall to refrain from addressing the issue in his biography. Randall passed on this information to James Parton, another historian. Parton published the Carr story, and major historians of Jefferson generally denied Jefferson's paternity for nearly 150 years. In 1953, new documentation related to this issue was published and studied by historians. In 1974, biographer Fawn M. Brodie suggested Jefferson had been the father of Hemings' children. In 1997, the controversy was reopened when Annette Gordon-Reed published an analysis of the historiography on this issue, deconstructing previous versions and detailing oversights and bias. That year Ken Burns released his documentary on Jefferson as a PBS series, highlighting the debate and conflicting viewpoints. A changed consensus emerged after a Y chromosome DNA analysis done in 1998 showed a match between a descendant of the Jefferson family male line, a descendant of Field Jefferson, and a descendant of Eston Hemings, Sally's youngest son. It showed no match between the Carr line and the Hemings descendant.

In the majority view, the DNA evidence is consistent with Jefferson's being the father of Eston Hemings, and the historical evidence favors Jefferson's paternity for all of Hemings's children. In 2018, the Thomas Jefferson Foundation, with introduction of a new exhibit on Sally Hemings, asserted the relationship is "settled historical matter". However, some scholars contend that, although reasonable people can disagree, the evidence is not conclusive enough to prove Jefferson fathered children with Hemings. Among other counterarguments, dissenters point out that there were 25 adult male descendants of Thomas Jefferson's father Peter living in Virginia during the time of Hemings' pregnancies, with Thomas's brother Randolph being their most likely alternative candidate.

In 2026, Penguin Random House published a book detailing a 15-year long effort to sequence DNA from a sample of hair purported to have been Jefferson's and compare it to DNA of known Jefferson descendants and descendants of Madison Hemings and Eston Hemings. (The study did not find any known descendants of Beverly or Harriet for DNA testing.) The book asserted with "great certainty" that Jefferson fathered both Madison and Eston Hemings. That effort has been questioned, including from a Hemings descendant who withdrew her participation from the study over concerns about the effort's publication history.

== Background ==
Jefferson became a widower at age 39 in 1782. He never remarried and died in 1826. Sally Hemings, a "quadroon" (3/4 white), was his much younger slave and a likely half-sister of his wife. According to oral tradition of the latter's descendants, the then recently widowed Thomas Jefferson previously had a sexual relation with her sister Mary and fathered at least one of her children. In 1787, when Hemings was 14, she accompanied his daughter Maria to Paris, where Jefferson was serving as the American ambassador to France. Hemings and Jefferson are believed to have started a sexual relationship at some time before 1789, when the 16-year-old returned with him to Monticello. Most historians now believe that this relationship lasted nearly four decades, until Jefferson's death, and that he fathered six children by Hemings.

Four of Hemings' children survived to adulthood. In the antebellum period, hers would have been called a shadow family. Sally Hemings was also the child of a shadow family. Historians believe her father to have been John Wayles, Jefferson's father-in-law, who, as a widower, had a 12-year liaison with his mulatta slave Betty Hemings and fathered six children with her. These children had three-quarters European, one-quarter African ancestry, and were half-siblings to Jefferson's wife Martha Wayles Skelton Jefferson. Sally Hemings was the youngest child of this shadow family. Jefferson's former slave Isaac Jefferson described Sally as "mighty near white ... very handsome, long straight hair down her back."

Of the four Hemings children who survived to adulthood—Beverly, Harriet, Madison, and Eston Hemings—all but Madison Hemings eventually identified as white and lived as adults in white communities. Under the Virginia law of partus sequitur ventrem, because Sally Hemings was a slave, her children were also born enslaved. But the children were seven-eighths European, one-eighth African by ancestry. If free, they would have been considered legally white in Virginia of the time.

== Controversy ==
=== Early claims ===
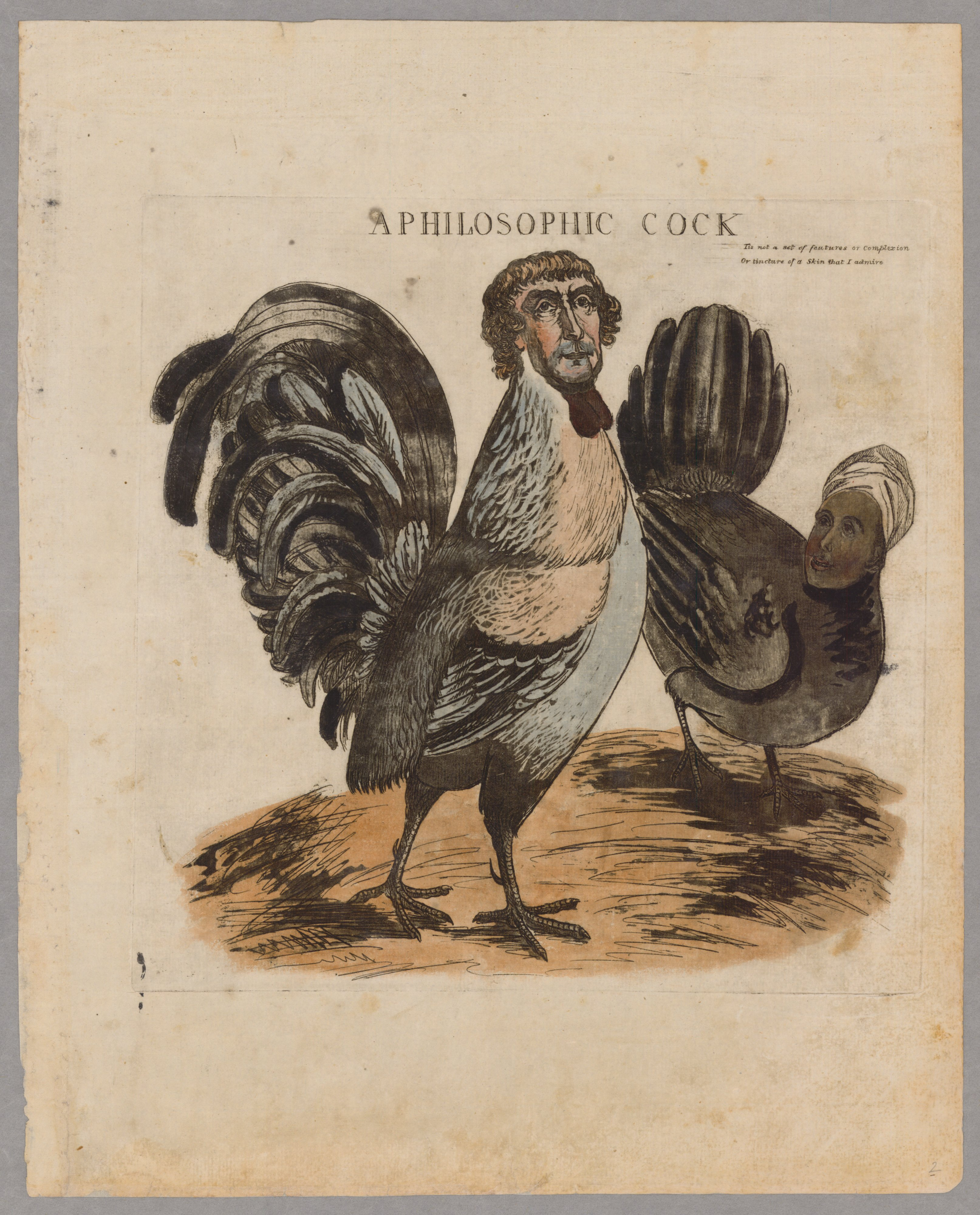
Caricature of Thomas Jefferson and Sally Hemings, c. 1804, attributed to James Akin (American Antiquarian Society)

In 1802, the journalist James T. Callender, after being refused an appointment to a postmaster position by Jefferson and issuing veiled threats of "consequences," reported that Jefferson had fathered several children with a slave concubine named Sally. Others privately or publicly made the claim. Elijah Fletcher, the headmaster of the New Glasgow Academy (Amherst County, Virginia) visited Jefferson in 1811 and wrote in his diary:

Republicans as well as federalists in his own County dislike him and tell many anecdotes much to his disgrace—I confess I never had a very exalted opinion of his moral conduct—but from the information I gained of his neighbors, who must best know him—I have a much poorer one—The story of black Sal is no farce—That he cohabits with her and has several children by her is a sacred truth—and the worst of it is he keeps the same children slaves—an unnatural crime which is very common in these parts.

Jefferson made no public comment on the matter, although most historians interpret his cover letter from 1805 to Secretary of the Navy Robert Smith as a denial alluding to a fuller reply, which has been lost.

The Jefferson-Wayles descendants and most historians denied for nearly 200 years that he was the father of Hemings' children. Since the mid-20th century, there have been challenges to that denial, as historians have reexamined some of the evidence and thought to interpret it differently. Disagreements have arisen since the late 20th century over how to interpret historical evidence related to the issue. According to an 1868 letter by Jefferson's biographer Henry S. Randall to the historian James Parton, Jefferson's grandson, Thomas Jefferson Randolph, said that Jefferson's surviving daughter Martha stated on her deathbed that Jefferson had been away from Monticello for 15 months before one of Hemings' children was born, so could not be the father. But historian Dumas Malone later documented that Jefferson had been at Monticello nine months before the birth of each of Hemings' children.

Randall also quotes Randolph saying:

[S]he [Hemings] had children which resembled Mr. Jefferson so closely that it was plain that they had his blood in their veins ... He [Randolph] said in one instance, a gentleman dining with Mr. Jefferson, looked so startled as he raised his eyes from the latter to the servant behind him, that his discovery of the resemblance was perfectly obvious to all.

Randolph told Randall that the late Peter Carr, Jefferson's nephew by his sister and a married man at the time, had fathered Hemings' children, as an explanation for the "startling" close resemblance that every visitor to Monticello could see. According to legal professor Annette Gordon-Reed, by this act, he was violating a strong social taboo against naming a white man as the father of slave children, to explain the strong physical resemblance seen by visitors. She suggested he would only have done so for the more compelling reason of protecting his grandfather.

Because of the social taboos about this topic, Randolph requested, and Randall agreed, to omit any mention of Hemings and her children in Randall's three-volume biography, Life of Thomas Jefferson (1858). But Randall passed on the Randolph oral history in a letter to the historian James Parton. He also suggested that he had personally seen records proving the fifteen-month separation – but no such record has been found. Randall's 1868 letter relating Randolph's family account of the Peter Carr paternity was a "pillar" of later historians' assertions that Carr was the father of Hemings' children, and Jefferson was not.

=== Ohio reports and Madison Hemings ===
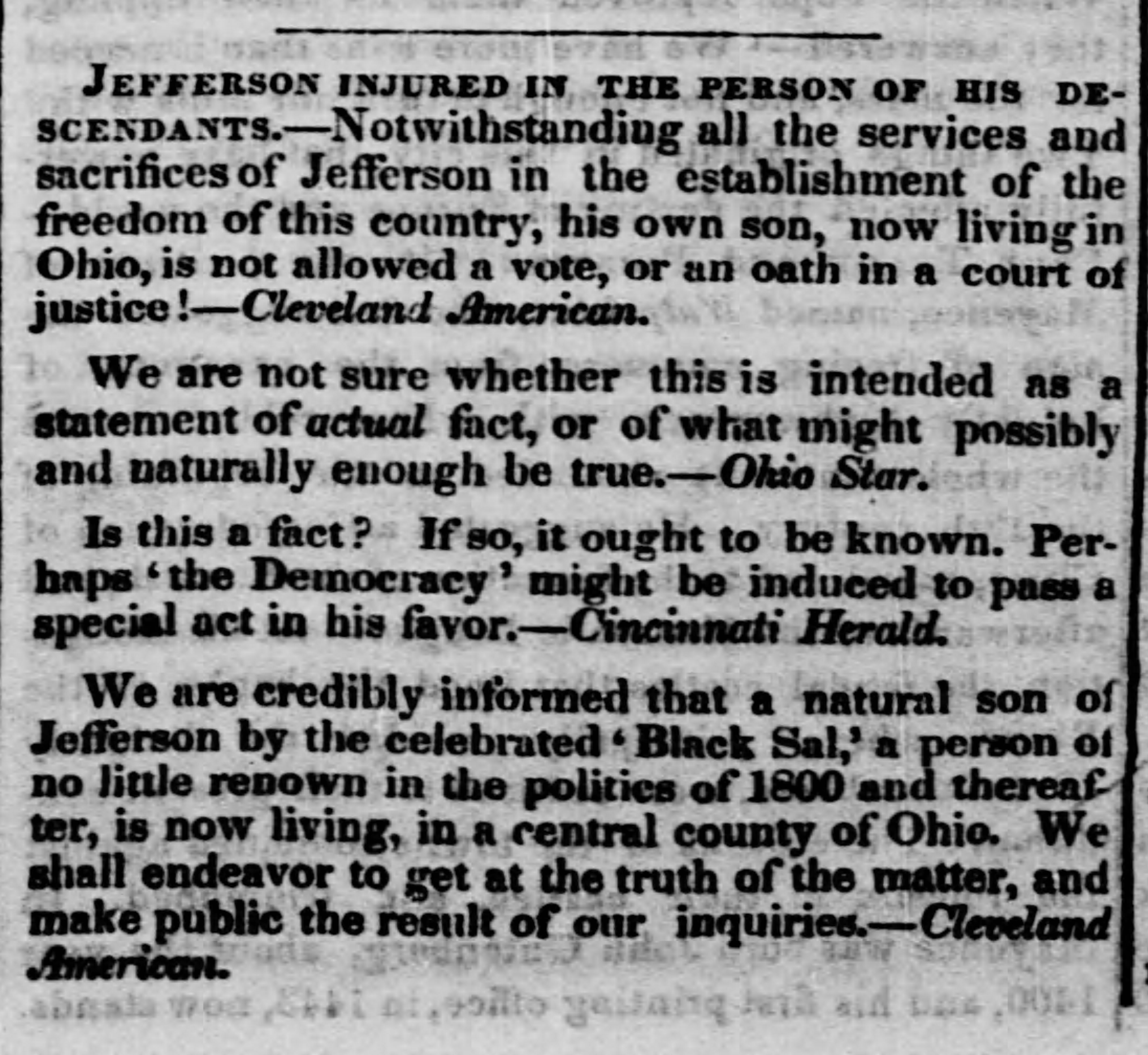
19 December 1845 article in The Liberator reporting on the lack of rights for Eston or Madison in Ohio

In November 1845, Ohio newspapers reported that one of Jefferson's sons by Sally Hemings, living in a central Ohio county, was not allowed to vote or testify in court due to Ohio laws regarding his race. The story was subsequently reported by William Lloyd Garrison's newspaper, The Liberator.

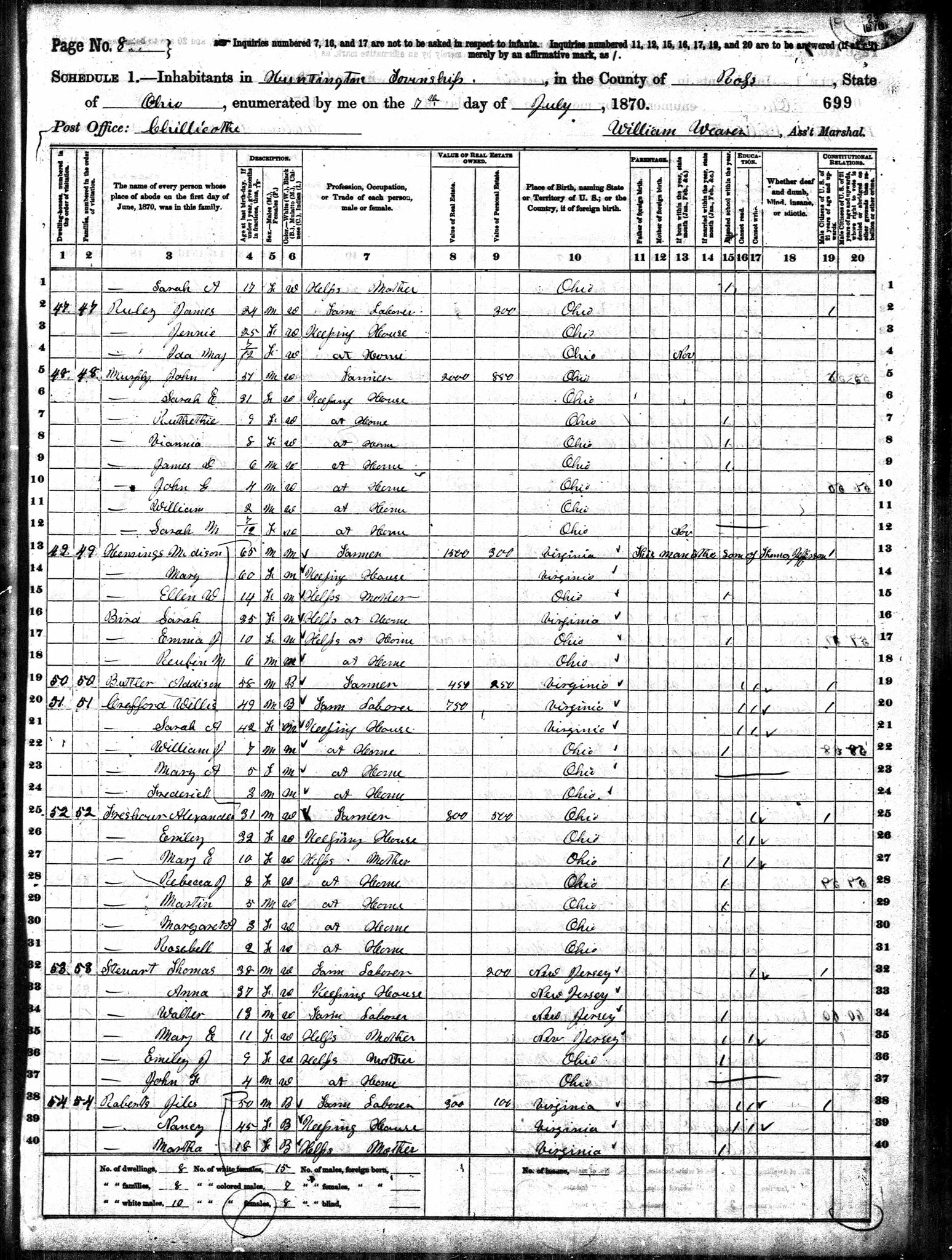
Line 13

On July 7, 1870, Chillicothe, Ohio, census taker William Weaver made a note in his official census book beside the entry for "Hemmings, Madison": "This man is the son of Thomas Jefferson."

In 1873, the issue received renewed, widespread attention after the publication of an interview with Madison Hemings, who asserted that Jefferson was his father. Madison had been freed by Jefferson in his will, as he came of age -- he explained that this was the result of a promise Jefferson made to Sally about their children. He was interviewed about his life as a slave at Monticello, and his account was published in an Ohio newspaper. Then age 68, Hemings claimed Jefferson as his and his siblings' father. He said that when Jefferson and Sally Hemings were still in Paris, she became pregnant with his child. Slaves could petition for their freedom in France, and Hemings initially showed reluctance when Jefferson asked her to return with him to Virginia. Based on Jefferson's promise to free her children when they came of age, she returned with him to the United States from France. Israel Jefferson, also a former slave of Monticello, confirmed the account of Jefferson's paternity of Hemings' children in his own interview published that year by the same Ohio newspaper. Critics attacked the newspaper account as politically motivated and the former slaves as mistaken, or worse.

In 1874, James Parton published his biography of Jefferson, in which he attributed the content of Madison Hemings' memoir to the political motives of a journalist who interviewed him. He and other critics essentially discounted Madison's memoir, while attributing to him a range of negative motives for telling his story. In his work, Parton repeated the Jefferson family's oral history about a Carr paternity and the claim that Jefferson was absent during the conception period of one of Hemings' children.

=== Modern historians ===
Succeeding 20th-century historians, such as Merrill Peterson and Douglass Adair, relied on Parton's book as it related to the controversy. In turn, Dumas Malone adopted their position. In the 1970s, as part of his six-volume biography of Jefferson, Malone was the first to publish a letter by Ellen Randolph Coolidge, Randolph's sister that added to the Carr paternity story. But she claimed that the late Samuel Carr, brother to Peter and also a nephew of Jefferson's through his sister, had fathered Hemings' children. Like Peter, Samuel was married when Hemings' children were born. Neither of the Randolphs named Jefferson's nephews as putative fathers of Hemings' children until after the men had died.

The above 20th-century historians and other major biographers of the late 20th century, such as Joseph Ellis and Andrew Burstein, "defended" Jefferson based on the Jefferson/Randolph family testimony: saying that he was absent at the conception of one Hemings child, and the family identified Peter or Samuel Carr as the father(s) of Hemings' children. Also, the historians concluded from their interpretations of Jefferson's personality and views that he would not have had such a relationship. They noted he had expressed antipathy to blacks and miscegenation in his writings, and he was thought to have a "high" moral character.

The manuscripts for Thomas Jefferson's Farm Books were rediscovered and published for the first time in 1953, edited by Edwin M. Betts. They provided extensive data about slaves and slave births, including all of Sally Hemings' children, and have been used extensively by researchers.

Black oral history preserved the account of the Jefferson-Hemings relationship and the place of African Americans at the center of United States history. Black historians began to publish material related to the mixed-race Hemings descendants. Lerone Bennett, in his article, "Thomas Jefferson's Negro Grandchildren," published in Ebony in November 1954, examined the current lives of individuals claiming descent from this union.

In 1961, historian Pearl M. Graham published an article in the Journal of Negro History on Jefferson and Hemings. It was based on material from the Farm Books, as well as a detailed timeline of Jefferson's activities developed by historian Dumas Malone in his extensive biography. This was published in several volumes beginning in the 1940s. Graham noted that Hemings conceived her children only when Jefferson was in residence at Monticello, during a time when he traveled frequently and was away for lengthy periods. Graham also provided biographical information on Sally's children; she supported accounts that Hemings and Jefferson had several children together.

In 1972, Fawn M. Brodie published "The Great Jefferson Taboo" in American Heritage magazine. She addressed the rumors of Jefferson's relationship with Sally Hemings, his quadroon slave, conducted extensive research, and concluded that they had a long relationship. Anticipating "inevitable controversy", the magazine broke with its usual practice and published Brodie's extensive footnotes for her article.

== Evidence ==
In 1953, Thomas Jefferson's Farm Book was published in an edited version, after having been rediscovered. Its records of slave births, deaths, purchases, and sales, and other information has provided researchers with considerable data about the lives of slaves at Monticello, including the births of all of Sally Hemings' known children.

Dumas Malone documented Jefferson's activities and residencies through the years. His documentation in his multi-volume biography (published 1948–1981) provided the details that Pearl Graham analyzed to show Jefferson was at Monticello for the conception of each of Hemings' children. She never conceived when he was not there. According to Jefferson family oral history, Martha Randolph, Jefferson's daughter with Martha Wayles Jefferson, had made a deathbed claim that Jefferson was away for a 15-month period during which one of the Hemings children was conceived. Gordon-Reed shows this claim is not supported by Malone's documentation; Jefferson was at Monticello at the time of conception of each child.

In 1968, the historian Winthrop Jordan said that Jefferson was at Monticello "nine months prior to each birth" of Hemings' children, during a 13-year period when he was often away for months at a time. He acknowledged that the relationship was possible. Fawn Brodie also used this information in her biography of Jefferson, which contributed to her conclusion that he had fathered Hemings' children. The source for the birth dates of the children is Jefferson's Farm Book.

In 2000, a statistical analysis of the conception data and Jefferson's residencies concluded it was 99 percent likely that he was the father of her children, and that there was only a 1 percent chance that he was not the father of all her children. This analysis, commonly referred to as a Monte Carlo simulation, was done by Fraser D. Neiman, head of archaeology at Monticello. In 2001, the Scholars Commission Report of the Thomas Jefferson Heritage Society criticized the study, as they said Neiman had not accounted for the possibility of multiple fathers.

The Hemings children were named for people in the Randolph-Jefferson family or who were important to Jefferson, rather than for people in the Hemings family. When mixed-race children were sired by the master, they were frequently named after people from his family. Jefferson gave the Hemings family special treatment: the three boys while young were kept close to their mother, where they had very light household duties. At working age, they were each apprenticed to the master carpenter of the estate, the most skilled artisan, who was also their uncle. This would provide them with skills to make a good living as free adults.

According to Annette Gordon-Reed, Thomas Jefferson's treatment of Sally Hemings' children is a good indication that he could have fathered the children. Harriet Hemings did not begin working as a weaver until she was fourteen years old. Many of Jefferson's slaves would have started at ten. Another example is that unlike other slaves, Madison Hemings stated that until they were put to work, they would run errands with Sally. This was very uncommon.

Most importantly, Gordon-Reed notes that Jefferson freed all the Hemings children. Theirs was the only slave family to all go free from Monticello; they were the only slaves freed in their youth and as they came of age, and Harriet Hemings was the only female slave he ever freed. He allowed Beverley (male) and Harriet to "escape" in 1822 at ages 23 and 21, although Jefferson was already struggling financially and would be $100,000 (US$2,845,588 in 2025 dollars) in debt at his death. He gave his overseer money to give to Harriet for her journey. Jefferson avoided publicity this way, but the gentry at the time noted the Hemingses' absences.

Monticello's overseer Edmund Bacon noted in his memoir (published after Jefferson's death) that people were talking about Harriet's departure. In the memoir, Bacon stated that in all the years he had worked there, he never saw Jefferson and Sally Hemings together in any capacity that would suggest a sexual liaison, and on several occasions witnessed another man leaving Sally's room early in the morning. In an interview Bacon maintains:

He freed one girl some years before he died, and there was a great deal of talk about it. She was nearly as white as anybody, and very beautiful. People said he freed her because she was his own daughter. She was not his daughter; she was ___'s daughter. (Note: The name of the man mentioned by Bacon was omitted by Rev. Pierson presumably to protect any living descendants at the time.) I know that. I have seen him come out of her mother’s room many a morning, when I went up to Monticello very early.

In his 1826 will, Jefferson freed the younger brothers Madison and Eston Hemings, who were approaching the age of 21. To enable them to stay in Virginia, Jefferson's will petitioned the legislature for permission for them to stay in the state with their families. (Such legislative approval was required by laws related to manumission and free blacks.) Jefferson also freed three older males from the extended Elizabeth Hemings family; they had each served him for decades. His will also requested that they be allowed to stay in the state. Jefferson's daughter Martha Randolph gave Sally Hemings "her time" after Jefferson's death, an informal freedom, and the former slave lived with her two younger sons, Madison and Eston, in nearby Charlottesville for nearly a decade before her death.

== 1998 DNA study ==
According to an initial report on the findings of a 1998 DNA study which tested the Y-chromosome of direct male-line descendants of Eston Hemings, and other related tests, there is a high probability that Thomas Jefferson was the biological father of Eston Hemings, with a nearly perfect match between the DNA of Jefferson's paternal uncle and the descendants of Eston Hemings. These initial claims were later explained by the lead researcher in the case, acknowledging that the DNA was compatible with the paternity of a Jefferson male and that it was inconsistent with paternity by any of the Carr brothers.

In his reply to questions on the study, the authors of the DNA study made clear:

We know from the historical and the DNA data that Thomas Jefferson can neither be definitely excluded nor solely implicated in the paternity of illegitimate children with his slave Sally Hemings.

In the Monticello Commission's report on the paternity question, Dr. David Page, one of the committee's scientific case reviewers, recommended that additional research needed to be done into "the local population structure around Monticello two hundred years ago, as respects the Y chromosome," before entirely ruling out the possibility of the paternity of any of the other 7 potential paternity candidates.

== 2026 DNA study ==
In September 2026, a study funded by the Smithsonian Institution reported, based on new DNA analyses, a greater than 99.9% chance that Thomas Jefferson fathered one or both of Madison Hemings and Eston Hemings. The study involved new methods that did not exist at the time of previous investigations. It utilized hair samples from Jefferson (cut, as was mourning custom, the day he died), and genetic samples from 13 living descendants of Jefferson, Madison and Eston (there are no known descendants of Beverly or Harriet). Some publications have mistakenly claimed that the hair was recovered from the Jefferson Bible.

The study's findings have been questioned, with critics pointing out that the study was not yet independently peer-reviewed, and that one of the Hemings descendants who participated in the study withdrew after becoming troubled by the publication history of the book. The geneticists said that this single withdrawal did not alter the findings.

== Historical consensus ==
External videos
- Washington Journal interview with Joseph Ellis about DNA evidence identifying Thomas Jefferson as the father of one of Sally Hemmings's children, November 7, 1998, C-SPAN

With the Eston Hemings descendant found consistent with the Jefferson male line, and inconsistent with the Carr male line, formerly skeptical biographers, such as Joseph Ellis and Andrew Burstein, publicly said they had changed their opinions and concluded that Jefferson had fathered Hemings' children. As Burstein said in 2005,

[T]he white Jefferson descendants who established the family denial in the mid-nineteenth century cast responsibility for paternity on two Jefferson nephews (children of Jefferson's sister) whose DNA was not a match. So, as far as can be reconstructed, there are no Jeffersons other than the president who had the degree of physical access to Sally Hemings that he did.

In 2000, the Thomas Jefferson Foundation, which operates Monticello, issued a report of its own investigation, which concluded by accepting Jefferson's paternity. Dr. Daniel P. Jordan, president of the foundation, committed at the time to incorporate "the conclusions of the report into Monticello's training, interpretation, and publications." This included new articles and monographs on the Hemings descendants reflecting the new evidence, as well as books on the interracial communities of Monticello and Charlottesville. New exhibits at Monticello show Jefferson as the father of the Sally Hemings children. In 2010, the Monticello website noted the new consensus that has emerged on Jefferson's paternity of Hemings' children in the decade since those major studies.

In its January 2000 issue, the William and Mary Quarterly published Forum: Thomas Jefferson and Sally Hemings Redux, a total of seven articles noting the changed consensus and the developing new views on Jefferson. One article had the results of an analysis by Fraser D. Neiman, who studied the statistical significance of the relationship between Jefferson's documented residencies at Monticello and Hemings' conceptions. He concluded that there was a 99 percent chance that Jefferson was the father of Hemings' children.

In May 2000, PBS Frontline produced, Jefferson's Blood, a program about the issues related to the DNA test and historical controversy. It stated in its overview:

More than 20 years after CBS executives were pressured by Jefferson historians to drop plans for a mini-series on Jefferson and Hemings, the network airs Sally Hemings: An American Scandal. Though many quarreled with the portrayal of Hemings as unrealistically modern and heroic, no major historian challenged the series' premise that Hemings and Jefferson had a 38-year relationship that produced children.

In the fall of 2001, the National Genealogical Society published a special issue of its quarterly devoted to the Jefferson–Hemings controversy. In several articles, its specialists concluded that, as the genealogist Helen M. Leary wrote, the "chain of evidence": historical, genealogical, and DNA, supported the conclusion that Thomas Jefferson was the father of all of Hemings' children.

== Dissenting views ==
=== The Thomas Jefferson Heritage Society ===
The Thomas Jefferson Heritage Society (TJHS) was formed with the purpose to dissent the shifting opinion of the newly forming consensus on the controversy, commissioned a report on the matter and asked a group of scholars to look at the evidence and make a public report detailing their conclusions. The TJHS Scholars Commission included Lance Banning, Walter E. Williams, Robert F. Turner, and Paul Rahe, among others. On May 26, 2000, John H. Works, the President of TJHS sent a letter to the Chairman of The Scholars Commission, Professor Robert Turner explaining to him that "you have our assurance that the work of The Scholars Commission will be completely independent of efforts to influence your methodology or conclusions by The Heritage Society or its members." The members of this commission included a diverse group of senior scholars, most having either chaired professorships or served as departmental chairs at prominent universities. Several had written highly respected books about Jefferson. They worked independently of the TJHS, were not compensated for their work, and spent nearly a year examining the arguments and evidence regarding paternity.

The group published its report in 2001. In it, they unanimously agree that the allegations were "by no means proven", and also state that they find it "regrettable that public confusion about the 1998 DNA testing and other evidence has misled people." The scholars on the Commission concluded that there was insufficient evidence to determine that Jefferson was the father of Hemings' children.

The report states that it is a matter about which reasonable people can disagree but by a margin of 12 to 1 their final views "ranged from 'serious skepticism' about the charge to a conviction that it is 'almost certainly false'." Their report suggested that his younger brother Randolph Jefferson, or one of his sons, was the father, and that Hemings may have had multiple partners. They emphasized that more than 20 Jefferson males lived in Virginia, eight within 20 miles of Monticello. Their report summary goes on to state "The most important results from the DNA testing may well have been the determination that Thomas Woodson, long thought by many to be the Tom referred to by James Callender in 1802 as having been conceived by Sally Hemings in Paris, and having a strong physical resemblance to the President could not have been the son of Thomas Jefferson. Subsequent DNA testing of descendants of a third Woodson son confirmed the earlier results. Most of us believe this goes far towards undermining any remaining credibility of the original Callender allegations." Paul Rahe published a minority view, saying he thought Jefferson's paternity of Eston Hemings was more likely than not.

The founder and Director Emeritus of the Thomas Jefferson Heritage Society Herbert Barger, a family historian, had assisted Eugene Foster by finding descendants of the Jefferson male line, Woodsons and Carrs for testing for the DNA study. Foster later said that Barger was "fantastic" and "of immense help to me".

The Monticello Jefferson-Hemings Report found that from its "research it was determined that, other than Thomas Jefferson, twenty-five adult male descendants of his father Peter (1707–1757) and his uncle Field (1702–1765) lived in Virginia during the 1794–1807 period of Sally Hemings's pregnancies." Of this number, in examining Randolph Jefferson as a candidate, it found that he made four recorded visits to Monticello (in September 1802, September 1805, May 1808, and sometime in 1814), though none coincided with possible dates of Sally Hemings' conceptions. In August 1807, a probable conception time for Eston Hemings, Thomas Jefferson wrote to his brother about visiting, but there is no evidence that the younger man arrived. Similarly, no documentation of a Randolph visit appears at the probable conception time for Madison Hemings.

John H. Works Jr., a Jefferson-Wayles descendant and a past president of the Monticello Association, a Jefferson lineage society, wrote that DNA tests indicated that any one of eight Jeffersons could have been the father of Eston. The team had concluded that Jefferson's paternity was the simplest explanation and consistent with historic evidence, but the DNA study could not identify Thomas Jefferson exclusively of other Jefferson males because no sample of his DNA was available.

In the fall of 2001, articles in the National Genealogical Society Quarterly criticized the TJHS Scholars Commission Report for poor scholarship and failure to follow accepted historical practices of analysis, or to give sufficient weight to the body of evidence. In the same year, historian Alexander Boulton wrote that Randolph Jefferson had never been seriously proposed as a candidate by historians before the 1998 DNA study. He noted "previous testimony had agreed" that Hemings had only one father for her children, and criticized the idea that she had multiple partners for her children. Jeanette Daniels, Marietta Glauser, Diana Harvey and Carol Hubbell Ouellette conducted research and in 2003 concluded that Randolph Jefferson had been an infrequent visitor to Monticello.

=== Monticello Association ===
In 1999, Lucian Truscott IV, a Wayles-Jefferson descendant and member of the Monticello Association, the Jefferson lineage society, invited Hemings' descendants to that year's annual meeting. The Association decided to commission its own report to determine whether it would admit Hemings' descendants to the lineage society (termed the MAC report or Membership Advisory Committee Report). The report was to determine whether the Hemings descendants could satisfy the society's requirements for documentation of lineage. The 2002 report to the Monticello Association concluded the evidence was insufficient to establish Jefferson's paternity. The majority of members voted against admitting the Hemings descendants as members of the group.

Truscott noted in American Heritage magazine that the Association had not had such strict documentation standards before the DNA study results were published in 1998. He checked the previous membership rules and found the following:

ARTICLE III — Membership . . . Any lineal descendant of Thomas Jefferson who applies for membership, and annually pays dues as stated in the By-Laws of this Association, shall be a Regular Member of the Association. . . ." Only those 33 of the 93 words in that section of the article address membership criteria; the rest of the paragraph was largely concerned with the payment of dues.

=== DNA testing efforts ===
Supporters of the thesis that Randolph Jefferson was the one who fathered Hemings' children have not been able to conduct DNA testing because the whereabouts of Randolph's remains are unknown. In 2025, a seventh-generation Jefferson descendant named John Works filed a petition in the Davidson County Chancery Court to exhume the remains of Randolph's son, John Randolph Jefferson, which are buried in the Nashville City Cemetery, to collect DNA samples and then reinter the remains. Attorneys for the city of Nashville opposed the petition, arguing city law only allowed for disturbing a grave under specific circumstances.

== Monticello Community ==
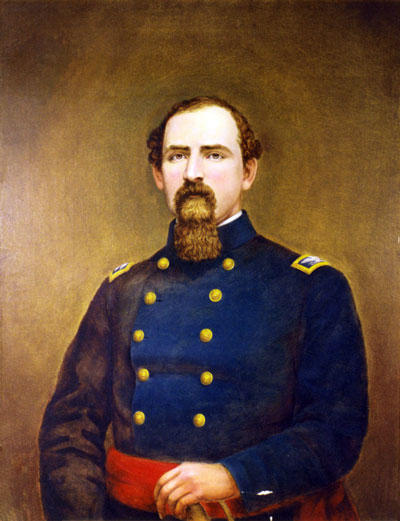
Colonel John Wayles Jefferson, son of Eston Hemings and widely believed to be the grandson of Thomas Jefferson

In 2010, Shay Banks-Young and Julia Jefferson Westerinen (descended from Sally Hemings' sons Madison and Eston, respectively; they identify as African American and white), and David Works (brother of John H. Works Jr., and descended from Martha Wayles), were honored with the international "Search for Common Ground" award for "their work to bridge the divide within their family and heal the legacy of slavery." The three have spoken about race and their extended family in numerous appearances across the country. After organizing a reunion at Monticello in 2003 of both sides of the Jefferson family, they organized "The Monticello Community", for descendants of all who lived and worked there during Jefferson's lifetime. In July 2007, the three-day Monticello Community Gathering brought together descendants of many people who had worked at the plantation, with educational sessions, tours of Monticello and Charlottesville, and other activities.

Shay Banks-Young, a descendant of Madison Hemings, had grown up with a family tradition of descent from Jefferson. David Works had originally resisted the new DNA evidence, but after he read the commissioned reports, he became convinced of Jefferson's paternity. Julia Jefferson Westerinen is descended from Eston Hemings. After Hemings moved his family to Madison, Wisconsin in 1852, they took the surname Jefferson and entered the white community. His descendants married and identified as white from then on.

In the 1940s, Julia's father and his brothers changed the family oral tradition and told their children they were descended from an uncle of Jefferson, as they were trying to protect them from potential racial discrimination related to their descent from Sally Hemings. In the 1970s, a cousin read Fawn McKay Brodie's biography of Jefferson and recognized Eston Hemings' name from family stories. She contacted Brodie and learned the truth about their descent. Their family was later contacted to recruit a male descendant for the 1998 DNA testing. Julia's brother, John Weeks Jefferson, was the Eston Hemings descendant whose DNA matched that of the Jefferson male line.

== Changing scholarship ==
In his last book before the DNA test results were published, Andrew Burstein wrote that Jefferson could not have been the father of Hemings' children. Since then he published Jefferson's Secrets: Death and Desire at Monticello (2005), in which he concluded that Jefferson did have a long-term sexual relationship with Sally Hemings.

Burstein said in an interview about his 2005 book,

On Jefferson's isolated mountaintop, sex took place as part of a hierarchy that everyone involved understood. Jefferson, and those of his class, did not share our current understanding of sexual morality. Sally Hemings was his servant, and had little power. She was dependent economically, though this does not mean her feelings were irrelevant. But it does mean that he had extraordinary power, and she very little, and so, as his concubine, she had probably replicated her mother's relationship with Jefferson's father-in-law; for she was, in fact, Jefferson's late wife's half-sister, and I have described the Hemings family as a parallel, subordinate family to the all-white Jeffersons.

In 2005 Christopher Hitchens published a new biography of Jefferson, whom he had always admired and praised. While continuing that praise, he assessed the president and his views. In an interview on NPR about the book, Hitchens discussed Jefferson's pessimistic views of the possibility of the co-existence of whites and blacks in the United States. He said,

Then there's the odd, of course, fact that he had a very long love affair with a woman who he owned, who he inherited from his father-in-law, who was his wife's half-sister, and produced several children by her, whose descendants have mainly been brought up on the white side of the color line. So in a strange way, his own patrimony disproves his own belief that there couldn't be coexistence between black and white Americans.

In her Pulitzer Prize-winning The Hemingses of Monticello: An American Family (2008), Annette Gordon-Reed recounts the history and biography of four generations of the enslaved Hemings family, focusing on their African and Virginian origins and interrelationships with the Jefferson-Wayles families, until the death in 1826 of Thomas Jefferson. She discusses Jefferson's complex relationships as the family's master, Sally Hemings' partner, and the father of her children.

Gordon-Reed is frequently asked about the emotional relationship between Jefferson and Hemings when giving talks. She writes, "In all the venues I have visited, from Houston to Stockholm, one question always arises: Did they love each other?" The question brings up many thorny issues in the context of a master-slave relationship. "Rape and the threat of it blighted the lives of countless enslaved women," she notes. "At the same time, some black women and white men did form bonds quite different in character from those resulting from sexual coercion."

In 2012, the Thomas Jefferson Foundation (which operates Monticello as a house museum and archive) and the Smithsonian Institution collaborated on a major exhibit held at the National Museum of American History, Slavery at Jefferson's Monticello: The Paradox of Liberty (January–October 2012). Described as a "groundbreaking exhibit", it was the first on the National Mall to address Jefferson as slaveholder and the family lives of slaves at Monticello. Members and descendants of six families, including the Hemings, were documented and the strength of the enslaved families was shown. The exhibit also noted that "evidence strongly support[s] the conclusion that Jefferson was the father of Sally Hemings' children." More than one million visitors saw the exhibit. Following the Washington run, the exhibit toured the US, being held at museums in Atlanta, St. Louis and other venues. Both the United States National Park Service and the University of Virginia's Miller Center of Public Affairs note in their online biographies that Jefferson's paternity of Hemings' children has been widely accepted.

== Representation in media ==
In 1979, Barbara Chase-Riboud published a novel on Hemings that gave her a voice, portraying her as both an independent woman and Jefferson's concubine. Jefferson historians succeeded in suppressing a planned CBS television film based on this novel. In 1995, the film Jefferson in Paris was released, which portrayed a Jefferson-Hemings liaison. CBS aired the television film Sally Hemings: An American Scandal (1999), also portraying this relationship; it was not challenged by any major historian.

While historians have discussed the issue, numerous artists, writers and poets have grappled with the meaning of Jefferson's paternity in American history, as in these selections from a list of resources listed in a Lehigh University student project of "History on Trial": The Jefferson-Hemings Controversy:

- Bolcom, William, composer. From the Diary of Sally Hemings. Perf: Alyson Cambridge, Lydia Brown. Audio CD. White Pine Music, 2010. Setting of text by Sandra Seaton (18 pieces)
- Hartz, Jill. Siting Jefferson: Contemporary Artists Interpret Thomas Jefferson's Legacy. Charlottesville: U of Virginia P, 2003. The record of a University of Virginia Art Museum exhibit, Hindsight/Fore-sight: Art for the New Millennium (2000), in which performance works, such as Todd Murphy's "Monument to Sally Hemings" (on the cover), were site-specific. A chapter is devoted to "Thomas Jefferson: Race and National Identity."
- Hindsight/Fore-Site: Art for the New Millennium (2000), University of Virginia Art Museum, some images from installations
- Mion, Tina. Half Sisters (2002 painting). Of Martha Jefferson and Sally Hemings, Mion wrote: "I feel that the real story is being overlooked. Most people don't know that Sally was Martha's half-sister and that, by written accounts, she looked like Martha. Sally moved into the White House after Martha's death. How strange it must have been for Jefferson to be constantly reminded of his dead wife."
- Monteith, Sharon. "Sally Hemings in Visual Culture: A Radical Act of the Imagination?" Slavery and Abolition 29.2 (2008): 233–46. Explores the representation of the Jefferson-Hemings relationship in visual culture.
- Park, Gloria Toyun. "Thomas Jefferson." (1998), Fiber Scene. In a public art installation at Columbia University, Park placed wigs she had made on historical public statues sited on the campus. She said, "Thomas Jefferson wore a slave bonnet and a wig, alluding to his alleged relationship with his slave mistress of forty years, Sally Hemings."
- Saar, Lezley. Harriet Hemings: Slave Daughter of Thomas Jefferson (1999), All-Art.org
- Salter, Mary Jo. "The Hand of Jefferson," in A Phone Call to the Future: New and Selected Poems, New York: Knopf, 2008. pp. 124–38. Excerpt: "His time is over. / He'll take the answer to his grave / whether he fathered children with his slave, / Sally Hemings; what words he'll offer / to cover himself are buried in a drawer, / meant for his tombstone."
- Seaton, Sandra. "From the Diary of Sally Hemings", Michigan Quarterly Review 40.4 (2001). (See William Bolcom above, who set several of these texts to music.)
- Taylor, Tess. "A Letter to Jefferson from Monticello", Common-Place, Vol. 13 No. 4, Poetry. See also poet's note: Research Notes. Taylor is a descendant from the Jefferson-Wayles marriage.
- "Virginia is for Lovers", The Hook, 19 April 2007. Article reports on the Committee for Jeffersonian Traditions, a "new secret society" at the University of Virginia, running a "Tommy Heart Sally" campaign "to knock school founder Thomas Jefferson off his pedestal and bolster the recognition of his African American slave and mistress, Sally Hemings."

== See also ==
- Clotel or The President's Daughter an 1853 novel by William Wells Brown
- Bibliography of Thomas Jefferson
- List of haplogroups of historic people
- Randolph Jefferson § Suggested paternity of Sally Hemings' children
- Children of the plantation
- African heritage of presidents of the United States
- List of presidents of the United States who owned slaves
- Anti-miscegenation laws in the United States
- List of federal political sex scandals in the United States
