= Israel Jefferson =

American slave and steamboat worker

Israel Jefferson (1797 – c. 1879), known as Israel Gillette before 1844, was born a slave at Monticello, the plantation estate of Thomas Jefferson, third President of the United States. He worked as a domestic servant close to Jefferson for years, and also rode with his brothers as a postilion for the landau carriage.

After 1826, Gillette was sold to Thomas Walker Gilmer as part of the sale of 130 slaves from Monticello following Jefferson's death, when many families were broken up. He purchased his freedom from Gilmer in 1844 and took the surname of Jefferson. According to his memoir, this was at the suggestion of a clerk when he registered as a free man.

Jefferson and his freeborn wife Elizabeth moved to the free state of Ohio, where he worked on a steamboat. In 1873, he was interviewed and his memoir was published in the Pike County Republican, the same year as a memoir by Madison Hemings, also a former slave at Monticello. Jefferson's memoir provided detailed information on life at Monticello. In it, he also attested to Thomas Jefferson's fathering the children of Sally Hemings, affirming Madison's account. In 1998, a DNA study showed a match between the Jefferson male line and a descendant of Eston Hemings, the youngest son.

== Early life and education ==
Israel Gillette was born into slavery; he estimated about 1797. Thomas Jefferson Randolph claimed records showed Israel's birth to be 1800. His enslaved parents were a woman known as Jane and Edward Gillett. Together, Edward and Jane had thirteen children, all of whom bore their father's surname Gillette.

During his years as a slave at the Monticello estate, Gillette served in a number of capacities, starting as a waiter at the family table at about the age of eight years. Of his service to Mr. Jefferson, he said: "For fourteen years I made the fire in his bedroom and private chamber, cleaned his office, dusted his books, run of errands and attended him about home". He and his older brother Gilly "... were both retained about the person of our master as long as he lived." He added, "Frequently, gentlemen would call upon him on business of great importance, whom I used to usher into his presence," and "sometimes I would be employed in burnishing or doing some other work in the room where they were."

Among the visitors was the Marquis de Lafayette, who had served in the Revolution. Of that occasion Israel Jefferson recalled:

In those times I minded but little concerning the conversations which took place between Mr. Jefferson and his visitors. But I well recollect a conversation he had with the great and good Lafayette, when he visited this country in 1824 and 1825, as it was of personal interest to me and mine.

It was during this frank discussion that Lafayette expressed his concerns about the continuation of slavery in the now independent United States of America.

In the book Friends of Liberty, Gary Nash and Graham Russell Gao Hodges describe this conversation:

"Speaking openly in the presence of Israel, Jefferson's slave who waited on their tables and stood postilion on his master's carriage, Lafayette lectured Jefferson about the retired president's continued ownership of slaves and his unwillingness to speak out as a revered American leader on the subject. 'No man could rightfully hold ownership of his brother man,' Lafayette gravely maintained. He had come from France to fight for American independence because he believed they were fighting for a great and noble principle – the freedom of mankind." The account continues, "Now, decades later, he was grieved that instead of all being free, a portion were held in bondage. Rebuked, Jefferson contended that slavery should be extinguished but that the proper time had not yet arrived."

== Sold from Monticello ==
In 1829, three years after Jefferson's death, Gillette was among the 130 slaves sold from Monticello to settle Jefferson's debts. He was sold to Thomas Walker Gilmer. Thomas Jefferson Randolph, Jefferson's oldest grandson and executor of the late President's estate, supervised the sales, which broke up many of the slave families of Monticello.

Elected to the Virginia House of Delegates that same year, Gilmer was later named Speaker. He went on to be elected the 28th Governor of Virginia, and later to the 27th and 28th U.S. Congress. In 1844 Rep. Gilmer was appointed by President John Tyler to be U.S. Secretary of the Navy. Gillette later said that Gilmer asked him then to go with him to the capital as his servant, but he would have had to leave his wife behind.

Gillette "demurred," as he put it, not refusing but saying he preferred to gain his freedom. Having originally paid $500 for Gillette in 1829, Gilmer agreed in 1844 to let Gillette purchase his freedom for the same price. Gillette had served him for 14 years.

Secretary Gilmer was accidentally killed on board the newly commissioned warship U.S.S. Princeton when one of its two large guns the "Peacemaker" exploded during a test firing while on a ceremonial tour on the Potomac River with 400 guests aboard. He had been in his new post for just over one week. President John Tyler was also onboard, though unhurt. Israel believed that he himself would most assuredly have been killed alongside his former master had he accompanied him to Washington because, as he said, "... it would have been my duty to keep very close to his person." It was the unfortunate fate of another fellow slave by the name of Armistead, who was likewise obliged to be aboard ship at the time, to also perish in the explosion.

In order to avoid the Virginia law requiring freedmen to leave the state within 12 months after manumission, Gillette was purchased in his wife's name. He later recalled that it was not until they left Virginia for Ohio that he felt truly free. On registering as a free black in Ohio, a clerk suggested that he take the name of his master, the president Jefferson, which he did.

== Marriage and family ==
Gillette married twice. His first wife, Mary Ann Colter, a fellow slave with whom he had four children, died young. Their children were sold from Monticello before his own purchase, and he lost touch with them.

About 1838, while still held by Gilmer, Gillette met and married Elizabeth (Farrow) Randolph, a free woman of color and widow with ten children. As her mother Martha Thackey was white, Elizabeth was born free, according to the principle of partus sequitur ventrem. After he bought his freedom, Jefferson and Elizabeth decided to leave Virginia. They migrated with their family to the free state of Ohio, where they settled in Cincinnati. Upon arrival in Ohio, the Jeffersons renewed their marriage vows. They had been married about 35 years at the time of his memoir.

== The North, literacy and land ==
In Cincinnati, Jefferson learned to read and write. He worked as a waiter in the city but shifted to work on steamboats, where he earned much more money. The river boats traveled extensively on the Ohio and Mississippi rivers.

After living and working 14 years based in Cincinnati, he and his wife owned a farm together in Pike County. They became members of Eden Baptist Church, where Jefferson served as a deacon and treasurer. After the American Civil War and emancipation of all slaves, his brother Moses Gillette (1803-after 1880) migrated to Ohio with his family and settled near him.

During those years, Jefferson returned more than once to Monticello to visit. At the nearby Edge Hill plantation, around 1866 he encountered the elderly Thomas Jefferson Randolph, reduced to poverty as he had lost all his property during the Civil War. (In 1829 Randolph had published the first collection of President Jefferson's writings.)

=== "Life Among the Lowly" ===
Jefferson had been a close childhood friend of Madison Hemings, a son of Sally Hemings at Monticello. Madison, his brother Eston Hemings and their families also moved to Pike County, Ohio. In the year 1873, Hemings and Jefferson, then both established, older men, were both interviewed by the journalist Samuel F. Wetmore, who published their memoirs successively in the Pike County Republican under the feature title: "Life Among the Lowly." Hemings said that he and his siblings were children of Thomas Jefferson, and that their mother had been his concubine. (The liaison had first been reported in the early nineteenth century, in what became known by historians as the Jefferson-Hemings controversy.)

In his 1873 memoir, Jefferson corroborated Hemings' statement of being the "natural son" of Thomas Jefferson:

I know that it was a general statement among the older servants at Monticello, that Mr. Jefferson promised his wife, on her death bed, that he would not again marry. I also know that his servant, Sally Hemmings (sic), (mother to my old friend and former companion at Monticello, Madison Hemmings,) was employed as his chamber-maid, and that Mr. Jefferson was on the most intimate terms with her; that, in fact, she was his concubine. This I know from my intimacy with both parties, and when Madison Hemmings declares that he is a natural son of Thomas Jefferson, the author of the Declaration of Independence, and that his brothers Beverley and Eston and sister Harriet are of the same parentage, I can as conscientiously confirm his statement as any other fact which I believe from circumstances but do not positively know.

Jefferson noted that Sally Hemings and her four children had been freed at the death of Thomas Jefferson, as well as others in the Hemings family.

Thomas Jefferson Randolph, the president's eldest grandson, disputed Israel Jefferson's statement in an angry attack published in the Pike County Republican, December 25, 1873. He accused Israel Jefferson of "calumny" and adding to a political attack, and denied both that his grandfather had the relationship, and that he had freed Hemings and her children. (Note: Some facts are verifiable: Randolph's mother gave Hemings her time, an informal, discreet kind of freedom that enabled her to live in Charlottesville with her two sons; Thomas Jefferson freed two of her sons by name in his will of 1826, which was public, and had allowed the other two to "escape" earlier in 1822 when they came of age, which was known by his overseer Edmund Bacon, who wrote about it in his own memoir, and was observed by some of his neighbors at the time.)

Earlier in the 1850s, Randolph had told the historian Henry Randall that his late uncle Peter Carr was the father of Sally Hemings' children, although his uncle had been married and Randolph was violating a social taboo by naming him. Randall passed on the family story in an 1868 letter to the historian James Parton. In his 1874 biography of Thomas Jefferson, James Parton first published the Peter Carr paternity account; it was taken up by succeeding historians through the mid-20th century.

=== Jefferson-Hemings controversy ===
Until the late 20th century, historians generally discounted the testimony of Hemings and Israel Jefferson in favor of the denials of the president's recognized descendants. Following additional late 20th-century historical analysis by Annette Gordon-Reed, among others, and a DNA study in 1998 that disproved the Carr claim and showed a match between the Jefferson male line and an Eston Hemings' descendant, the scholarship has changed dramatically. Many historians now accept that Thomas Jefferson had a long-term relationship with Sally Hemings and fathered all her children. In 2012, the Smithsonian Institution and the Thomas Jefferson Foundation held a major exhibit at the National Museum of American History: Slavery at Jefferson's Monticello: The Paradox of Liberty; it says that "evidence strongly support[s] the conclusion that Jefferson was the father of Sally Hemings' children."

Other historians continue to dispute these conclusions, suggesting that Randolph Jefferson, the president's younger brother, or other Jeffersons could have been the father. They were never seriously proposed as alternatives until after the DNA study results were known.

== See also ==
- Thomas Jefferson and slavery
- Sally Hemings
- Madison Hemings
- Eston Hemings
- Harriet Hemings
- Isaac Jefferson
- List of slaves

== Bibliography ==
- Nash, Gary B.; Hodges, Graham R.G. (2008), Friends of Liberty; Thomas Jefferson, Tadeusz Kosciuszko, and Agrippa Hull. A Tale of Three Patriots, Two Revolutions, 'and' A Tragic Betrayal Of Freedom In The New Nation, New York: Basic Books
- Gordon-Reed, Annette (2008), The Hemingses of Monticello: An American Family, New York: W.W. Norton & Company, Inc.
- Brodie, Fawn (1998) Thomas Jefferson: An Intimate History, New York: W.W. Norton & Company, Inc.
