= Harriet Hemings =

Daughter of Thomas Jefferson (1801-died after 1822)

- Born: May 1801; Monticello, Albemarle County, Virginia, US
- Died: after 1822
- Occupation: Textile Worker
- Known for: Being daughter of Sally Hemings and Thomas Jefferson
- Parent(s): Sally Hemings; Thomas Jefferson
- Relatives: Beverly Hemings (brother), Madison Hemings (brother), Eston Hemings (brother)

Harriet Hemings (May 1801 – after 1822) was born into slavery at Monticello, the home of Thomas Jefferson, third president of the United States, in the first year of his presidency. Most historians believe her father was Jefferson, who is believed to have fathered, with his slave Sarah "Sally" Hemings, four children who survived to adulthood.

Additional samples of Thomas Jefferson's hair were identified in the 21st century and were used to create a Jefferson DNA profile, against which those of known descendants of Hemings’ younger brothers were compared. The later DNA testing conclusively proved that Jefferson fathered Hemings' younger brothers, Madison Hemings and Eston Hemings. Descendants of Hemings and her brother Beverley, who both reportedly married white spouses and lived as White Americans, have not thus far been identified.

While Jefferson did not legally free Harriet, in 1822 when she was 21, he aided her "escape". He saw that she was put in a stage coach and given $50 (~$1,209 in 2025) for her journey. Her brother Madison Hemings later said she had gone to Washington, D.C., to join their older brother Beverly Hemings, who had similarly left Monticello earlier that year. Both entered into white society and married white partners of good circumstances. All the Hemings children were legally slaves under Virginia law at the time, in accordance of which they inherited the status of their enslaved mother, who was three-quarters European in ancestry. Hemings and her siblings were seven-eighths European in ancestry, called octoroons in the terminology of the time. Legally, Hemings and her siblings were white under Virginia law at the time, even though they were born enslaved. Jefferson freed the two youngest brothers in his will of 1826, so they were legally free.

Beverly and Harriet stayed in touch with their brother Madison Hemings for some time, and then Harriet stopped writing.

== Early life and education ==
In 1773, Jefferson and his wife Martha Wayles Skelton Jefferson had inherited Sally Hemings, her mother Betty Hemings and ten siblings from the estate of her father John Wayles, along with more than 100 other slaves. The widower Wayles had had a 12-year relationship with Betty Hemings and six mixed-race children with her. They were therefore half siblings to Jefferson's wife, and they were three-quarters European. Sally was the youngest. As the historians Philip D. Morgan and Joshua D. Rothman have written, there were numerous interracial relationships in the Wayles-Hemings-Jefferson families, Albemarle County and Virginia, often with multiple generations repeating the pattern.

Harriet is believed to be the daughter of Sally Hemings and the widower Thomas Jefferson. It is widely believed that Jefferson and Hemings had a 38-year secret relationship beginning in Paris several years after the early death of his wife. Hemings was said to have a child born in 1790 after she returned from Paris, but it died as an infant. Hemings' first daughter who was recorded, was born in 1795. She was named Harriet but she died in infancy. This name was prominent among women in Jefferson's family. It was customary to name the next child of the same sex after one who had died. Harriet's surviving siblings were her older brother William Beverley, called Beverley; and younger brothers James Madison and Thomas Eston Hemings. Like the other Hemings children, Harriet had light duties as a child, which she spent mostly with her mother. At the age of 14, she was started in training to learn weaving and later worked at the cotton factory on the plantation.

In 1822, at the age of 21, Harriet left Monticello. Jefferson instructed his overseer Edmund Bacon to give her $50 (equivalent to $1,210 in 2025) to help on her journey. Although legally she had escaped and was a "fugitive", Jefferson never tried to persuade her to return or posted notice of escape. Harriet Hemings was the only female slave he "freed" in his lifetime.

Although Jefferson's granddaughter Ellen Randolph Coolidge wrote that he had a policy of allowing nearly white slaves to leave and she recalled four who had, this was not accurate. Jefferson had no such policy and freed few slaves. There were many mixed-race slaves at Monticello, both in the larger Hemings family and other slave families. Coolidge appeared to be trying to cover up his freeing the children of Sally Hemings.

Edmund Bacon, chief overseer at Monticello for about twenty years, described Harriet's gaining freedom:

Mr. Jefferson freed a number of his servants in his will ... He freed one girl some years before he died, and there was a great deal of talk about it. She was nearly as white as anybody and very beautiful. People said he freed her because she was his own daughter. She was not his daughter; she was __________'s daughter. I know that. I have seen him come out of her mother's room many a morning when I went up to Monticello very early. (According to Turner, "This was not the only name deleted in the original Pierson book in 1862.... Pierson sought to justify these deletions by explaining that he did 'not like to publish facts that would give pain to any that might now be living.'")

Bacon wrote,

When she was nearly grown, by Mr. Jefferson's direction I paid her stage fare to Philadelphia and gave her fifty dollars. I have never seen her since and don't know what became of her. From the time she was large enough, she always worked in the cotton factory. She never did any hard work.

Jefferson indirectly and directly freed all four of the Hemings children when they reached the age of 21: Beverley and Harriet were allowed to escape in 1822; the last two sons, Madison and Eston, were freed in his will of 1826. They were the only slave family from Monticello whose members all achieved freedom. Jefferson's daughter Martha gave Sally Hemings "her time" after his death; this enabled her to leave Monticello and live freely with her last two sons in Charlottesville for the last decade of her life.

In 1794, Jefferson allowed Robert Hemings, one of Sally's brothers, to buy his freedom; in 1796 he freed James Hemings after requiring him to train his replacement chef for three years. He freed another of Sally's brothers and two of her nephews in his will of 1826; they had each served him for decades.

Susanna
Betty Hemings
John Hemings
Sally Hemings
Martha Waller
John Wayles
Edward Wayles
Harriet Hemings
Jane Rodgers
Jane Randolph
Isham Randolph
Thomas Jefferson
Mary Field
Peter Jefferson
Thomas Jefferson

Ancestry of Harriet Hemings; her great-grandmother Susanna was black, all her other great-grandparents were white.

== Life after Monticello ==
In 1873, Harriet's brother Madison Hemings described his siblings and their life at Monticello and afterward, claiming Thomas Jefferson and Sally Hemings as their parents. He said that Jefferson had promised Hemings when she became his concubine that he would free all her children. His interview was published as a memoir in the Pike County (Ohio) Republican.

He said of his sister Harriet: "She thought it to her interest, on going to Washington, [D.C.] to assume the role of a white woman, and by her dress and conduct as such I am not aware that her identity as Harriet Hemings of Monticello has ever been discovered." He said that Harriet and Beverley both had children. According to the scholar Annette Gordon-Reed, Harriet likely chose to move to Washington in order to join her brother Beverley, who was already there. Their younger brother Madison said in his 1873 memoir that they had both moved there, where they married and had families. Madison said Harriet later married a white man in good standing in Washington City .

Historian Pearl Graham interviewed people who claimed to descend from Harriet Hemings via a marriage to Reuben Coles, though historians have been unable to verify their line of descent. Alternately, there has been speculation that Hemings married a man named George Heckman and left descendants. DNA testing on the identified hair samples of two Coles descendants, which has thus far not been permitted, could answer the historical question conclusively. Other efforts to use historical records to trace her later life have so far been unsuccessful.

While Harriet and Beverly disappeared into history, more is known about the lives of their brothers Madison and Eston Hemings, who married in Charlottesville and began their families there. They both moved to Chillicothe in the free state of Ohio after their mother died in 1835. (See Madison Hemings and Eston Hemings.)

== Question of relationship ==
The Jefferson-Hemings controversy concerns the question of whether Jefferson, after becoming a widower, had an intimate relationship with his mixed-race slave, Sally Hemings, resulting in his fathering her six children of record. The controversy dates from the 1790s. In the late 20th century, historians began reanalyzing the body of evidence. In 1997, Annette Gordon-Reed published a book that analyzed the historiography of the controversy, demonstrating how historians since the 19th century had accepted early assumptions and failed to note all the facts. A consensus began to emerge after the results of a DNA analysis in 1998, which showed no match between the Carr male line, proposed for more than 150 years as the father(s), and the one Hemings descendant tested. It did show a match between the Jefferson male line and the Hemings descendant.

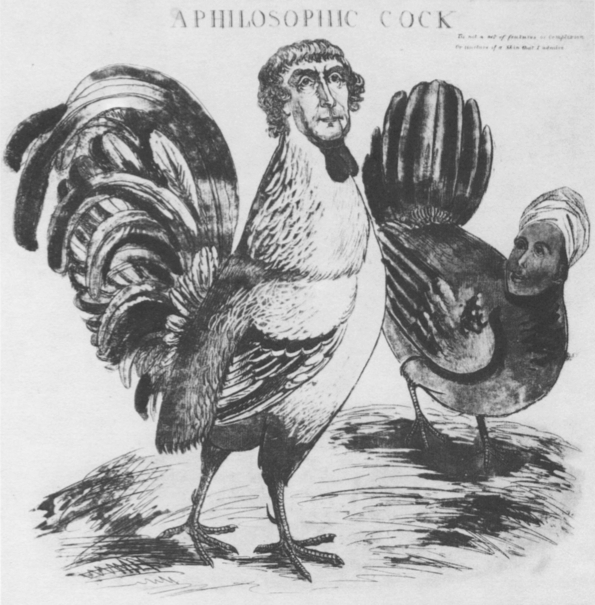
Thomas Jefferson as a cock and Sally Hemings as a hen. Engraving made by James Akin in 1804

Since 1998 and the DNA study, most historians have accepted that the widower Jefferson had a long intimate relationship with Hemings, and fathered six children with her, four of whom survived to adulthood. The Thomas Jefferson Foundation (TJF), which runs Monticello, conducted an independent historic review in 2000, as did the National Genealogical Society in 2001; both reported scholars who concluded Jefferson was likely the father of all of Hemings' children. Historian Catherine Kerrison has attempted to examine and re-evaluate Hemings' life through the limited sources available.

A vocal minority of critics, such as the Thomas Jefferson Heritage Society (TJHS), have disputed Jefferson's paternity of Hemings's children. They have concluded that there is insufficient evidence to determine that Jefferson was the father of Hemings's children. The TJHS report suggested that Jefferson's younger brother Randolph Jefferson could have been the father because the DNA evidence only concluded a male Jefferson was the father. Dr. Foster wrote, "It is true that men of Randolph Jefferson's family could have fathered Sally Hemings' later children...We know from the historical and the DNA data that Thomas Jefferson can neither be definitely excluded nor solely implicated in the paternity of illegitimate children with his slave Sally Hemings."

Other members of Thomas Jefferson's Monticello family have (as of 2018) accepted the fact that Thomas Jefferson is the father of Sally Hemings' six children. Eston Hemmings changed his name to Jefferson in his lifetime. In 1873, Madison Hemings and Israel Gillette separately recorded reminiscences of life at Monticello. Both identified Thomas Jefferson as the father of all of Sally Hemings's children. A Philosophic Cock, engraved by James Akin, 1804 shows Jefferson as a cock and enslaved Sally(notice turban) as his hen. In 1811, Elijah Fletcher wrote "the story of Black Sal is no farce – That [Jefferson] cohabits with her and has a number of children with her is a sacred truth."

== In popular culture ==
- William Wells Brown, Clotel; or, The President's Daughter, 1853, Project Gutenberg Etext, University of Vermont
- Wolf by the Ears (1991) by Ann Rinaldi

== See also ==
- William Beverly Hemings
- James Madison Hemings
- Thomas Eston Hemings
- John Wayles Jefferson
- Issac Jefferson
- Israel Jefferson

== Bibliography ==
- Nash, Gary B.; Hodges, Graham R. G., Friends of Liberty; Thomas Jefferson, Tadeusz Kosciuszko, and Agrippa Hull. A Tale of Three Patriots, Two Revolutions, and A Tragic Betrayal Of Freedom In The New Nation. New York: Basic Books (387 Park Ave. South, New York, NY 10016–8810), 2008
- Gordon-Reed, Annette (1997), Thomas Jefferson and Sally Hemings: An American Controversy, reprint with new foreword discussing DNA evidence, University of Virginia Press, 1998
- Gordon-Reed, Annette, The Hemingses of Monticello: An American Family, New York: W. W. Norton & Co., 2008
