= Walter Pearson =

Walter Pearson may refer to:

- Puggy Pearson (Walter Clyde Pearson), American professional poker player
- Walter Beverly Pearson, American inventor and industrialist
