= Eston Hemings =

Son of Thomas Jefferson and Sally Hemings (1808–1856)

- Born: Eston Hemings; May 21, 1808; Monticello, Virginia, U.S.
- Died: January 3, 1856 (aged 47); Madison, Wisconsin, U.S.
- Occupations: Carpenter, musician
- Spouse: Julia Ann Isaacs (m. 1832)
- Children: 3, including John Wayles Jefferson
- Parent(s): Sally Hemings; Thomas Jefferson
- Relatives: Beverly Hemings (brother), Harriet Hemings (sister), Madison Hemings (brother), John Wayles (grandfather)

Thomas Eston Hemings Jefferson (May 21, 1808 – January 3, 1856) was born into slavery at Monticello, the youngest son of Sally Hemings, a mixed-race enslaved woman, and her enslaver Thomas Jefferson, the third president of the United States. Additional samples of Thomas Jefferson's hair were identified in the 21st century and were used to create a Jefferson DNA profile, against which those of known descendants were compared. The later DNA testing conclusively proved that Jefferson fathered Sally Hemings' sons, Madison Hemings and Eston.

Jefferson’s paternity has been debated for centuries, but most historians who have considered the question previously believed that his father was Jefferson. Evidence from a 1998 DNA test showed that a descendant of Eston matched the Jefferson male line, and historical evidence also supports the conclusion that Thomas Jefferson was probably Eston's father. Many historians believe that Jefferson and Sally Hemings had six children together, four of whom survived to adulthood. Other historians disagree.

Jefferson freed Eston and his older brother Madison Hemings in his will, as they had not yet come of age at his death. They each married and lived with their families and mother Sally in Charlottesville, Virginia, until her death in 1835. Both brothers and their young families moved to Chillicothe, Ohio, to live in a free state, where Eston Hemings earned a living as a musician and entertainer.

In 1852 Eston moved with his wife and three children to Madison, Wisconsin, where they changed their surname to Jefferson and entered the white community. Their sons both served in the Union Army, and the older one, John Wayles Jefferson (see also, John Wayles), achieved the rank of colonel. After the war, he moved to Memphis, Tennessee, becoming a wealthy cotton broker and never married.

Eston's other children, Beverly (Beverly was also the name of Eston's oldest brother) and Anna Jefferson, married into the white community, and their descendants have identified as white. Beverly Jefferson's five sons were educated and three entered the professional class as a physician, attorney, and manager at the railroad. One of their male-line descendants was tested in the 1998 DNA study that found the link to the Jefferson-male line.

== Early life ==
What is known of Eston's life is derived from his brother Madison's 1873 memoir, a few entries in Thomas Jefferson's Farm Book, a handful of contemporary newspaper accounts, various census and land/tax records, and the family history of his descendants.

Eston was born into slavery as the youngest son of the enslaved Sally Hemings. As she was one of the six mixed-race children of Betty Hemings and John Wayles (Jefferson's father-in-law), she and her siblings were half-siblings to Jefferson's wife Martha Wayles and were three-quarters European in ancestry, as their mother had a white father. The historians Philip D. Morgan and Joshua D. Rothman have written about the numerous interracial relationships in the Wayles-Hemings-Jefferson families and the region, often with multiple generations repeating the pattern. The large Hemings family, with Betty Hemings as matriarch, was at the top of the slave hierarchy at Monticello; its members working as domestic servants, chefs, craftsmen and artisans.

Sally Hemings had light duties, and as children, Eston and his siblings "were permitted to stay about the 'great house', and only required to do such light work as going on errands." Like their older brother Beverley, at age 14 Madison and Eston each began training in carpentry, under tutelage of their uncle John Hemmings, the master woodworker at Monticello. All three brothers learned to play the violin (Jefferson also is known to have regularly played when he was younger, and his younger brother Randolph, according to the ex-slave Isaac Granger, "used to come out among black people, play the fiddle & dance half the night".)

Madison and Eston were freed in 1827, in accordance with President Jefferson's will. (Madison was 22; Eston was freed at 19.) Additionally, Jefferson's will petitioned the legislature to allow the Hemingses to stay in Virginia after being freed, unlike most freed slaves. In his 1873 memoir, Madison said the Hemings children were freed as a result of a promise Jefferson made to Sally Hemings.

After Jefferson's death, Sally Hemings was "given her time" by his daughter. The older woman lived freely with her two sons in Charlottesville. In the 1830 census, the census taker in Charlottesville classified all three Hemings as white, showing how others perceived them by appearance because of their overwhelming European ancestry. Sally was of three-quarters white ancestry. Her children were seven-eighths white and thus legally white under the Virginia law of the time. It was not until 1924 that Virginia passed the Racial Integrity Act, which classified anyone as black who had any known African ancestry, under the "one drop rule".

== Post-slavery life ==
Upon gaining freedom, Hemings initially pursued a career in woodworking and carpentry in Charlottesville, Virginia. In 1830, Eston Hemings purchased property and built a house on Main Street, where his mother lived with him until her death in 1835.

=== Marriage and family ===
In 1832, Eston married a free woman of color, Julia Ann Isaacs (1814–1889). She was the daughter of the successful Jewish merchant David Isaacs, from Germany, and Nancy West, a free woman of mixed race. Nancy West was the daughter of Priscilla, a former slave, and Thomas West, her white master. Thomas West left property to his children Nancy and James West in his will. Prohibited by law from marrying, David Isaacs and Nancy West maintained separate households and businesses for years (she was a successful baker). They had seven children together, and later in their lives shared a household.

Eston and Julia Ann Hemings had three children: John Wayles Jefferson (1835–1892), Anna Wayles Jefferson (1837–1866), and Beverly Frederick Jefferson (1839–1908) (their surname was changed from Hemings to Jefferson as the family moved to Wisconsin after 1850.) The first two were born in Charlottesville. And Beverly was born in Ohio shortly after their arrival in Ohio.

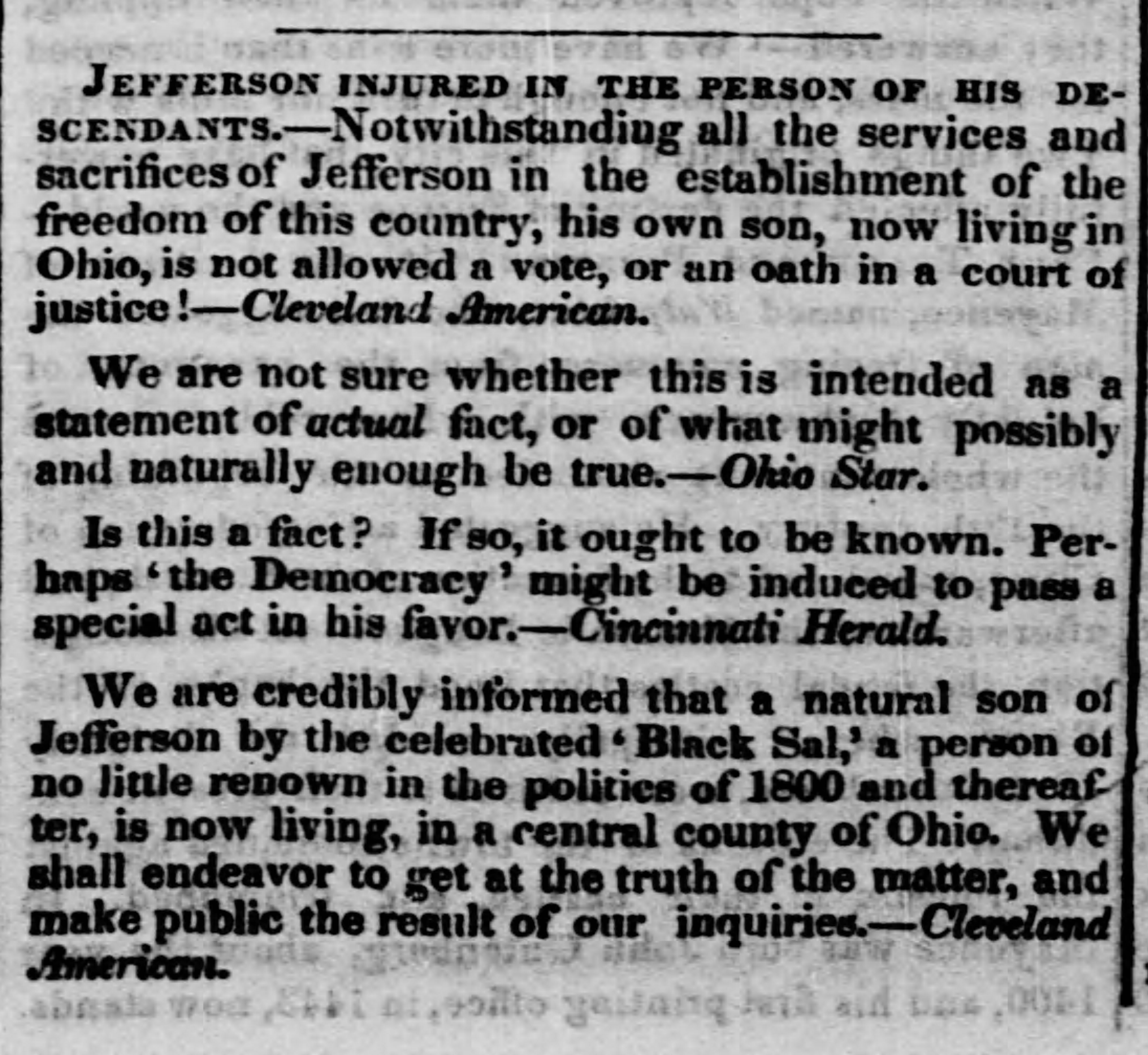
1845 article in The Liberator about the Hemings family in Ohio

About 1837 Hemings moved with his family to Chillicothe, a town in southwest Ohio (a free state) with a thriving community. Numerous free blacks and white abolitionists had support-stations linked to the Underground Railroad to aid escaping slaves. There Hemings became a professional musician, playing the violin or fiddle and leading a successful dance band. The children were educated in integrated schools. Anna for a time attended the Manual Labor School at Albany, Ohio. A former classmate later wrote that she was introduced as "Miss Anna (or Ann) Heming[s] [sic], the grand daughter of Thomas Jefferson".

In a 1902 article of the Scioto Gazette, a correspondent wrote that while Hemings lived in Ohio in the 1840s, it was widely said that he and his brother Madison were the sons of Thomas Jefferson. In addition, several neighbors of Eston had traveled together to Washington, DC, where they saw a statue of Jefferson; they commented on how much Hemings resembled him. The correspondent also recollected:

Eston Hemings, being a master of the violin, and an accomplished "caller" of dances, always officiated at the "swell" entertainments of Chillicothe.

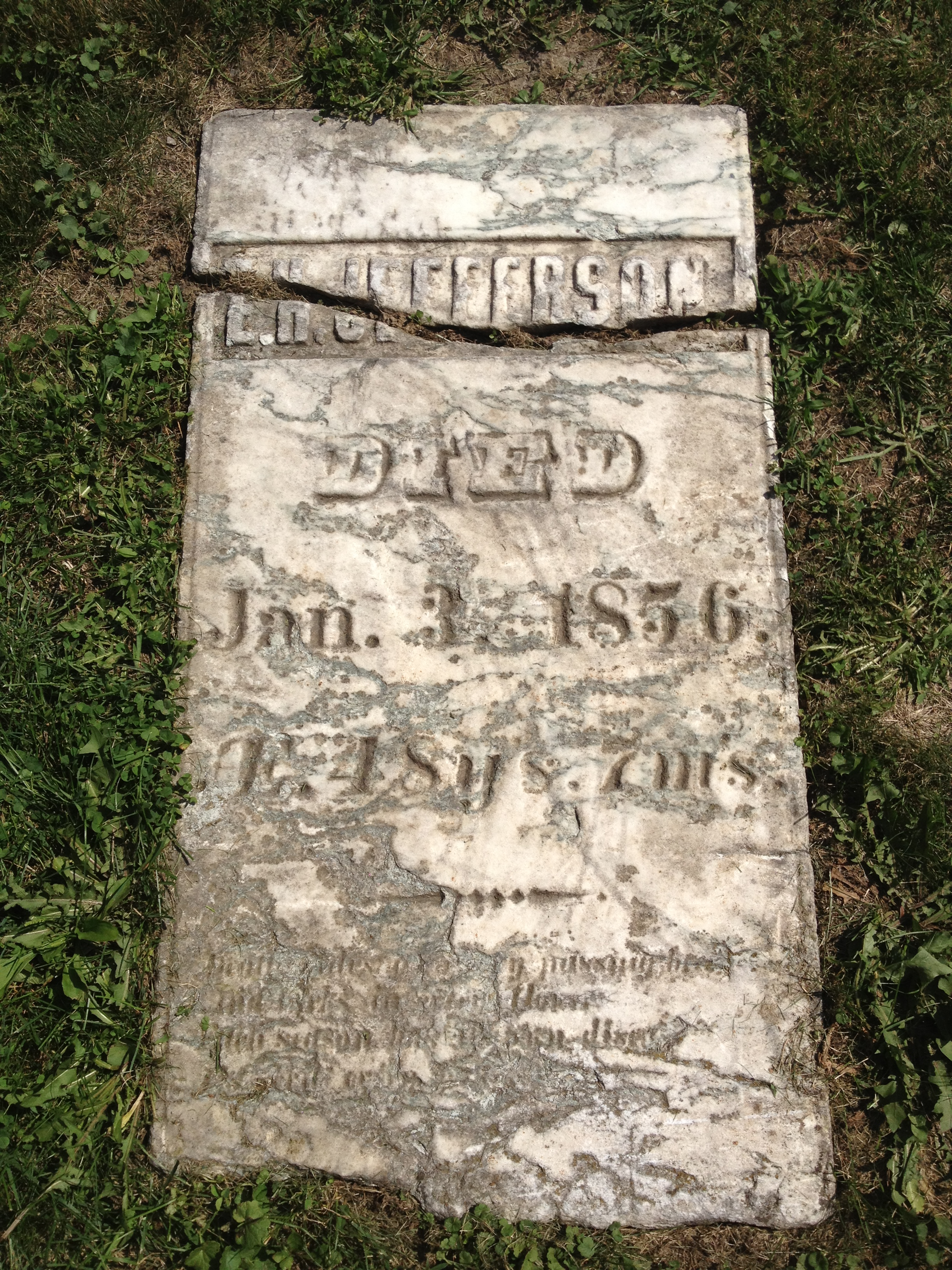
The gravesite of Eston Hemings Jefferson in Madison, Wisconsin.

Passage of the Fugitive Slave Act in 1850 increased pressure on the black communities in Ohio and other free states bordering slave states. In towns along the Underground Railroad, slave catchers invaded the communities, sometimes kidnapping and selling into slavery free people as well as fugitive slaves. In 1852, Eston decided to move the family further north for security, and migrated to Madison, Wisconsin. There they took the surname Jefferson, and they passed into the European-American (white) community. Eston Hemings Jefferson died in 1856.

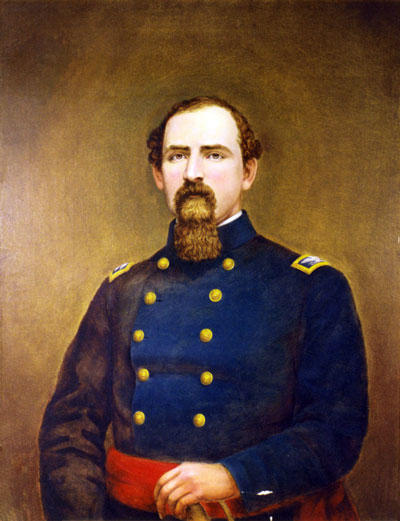
John Wayles Jefferson

Their eldest son John Wayles Jefferson served as a white officer in the regular United States Army during the American Civil War, achieving the rank of colonel. John W. Jefferson led the Wisconsin 8th Infantry. He was wounded twice in battle. During the war, he published letters home, and after the war, published articles about his experiences. Before the war, John Jefferson ran the American House hotel in Madison, which was taken over by his younger brother Beverley. After the war and the end of slavery in the U.S., John Jefferson moved to Memphis, Tennessee. He became a successful cotton broker, supported his mother, and left a considerable estate at his death in 1892. He never married or had known children.

Both Anna and Beverley Jefferson married white spouses, and their descendants have identified as white. Anna married Albert T. Pearson, a carpenter who was a captain during the Civil War. Their son Walter Beverly Pearson became a wealthy industrialist in Chicago.

Beverley Jefferson was also a Civil War veteran of the Union Army. Returning to Madison, he moved from the American House to run the Capitol House hotels. He founded the first omnibus line in the Wisconsin capital, and was a popular figure among politicians in the city. He married Anna Smith from Pennsylvania. Their five sons gained educations and three entered the professions: one became a doctor in Chicago, another an attorney, another worked in railroad management.

The Eston Hemings Jefferson family is buried in Forest Hill Cemetery, Madison.

== Descendants ==
In the 1970s, Jean Jefferson, unaware of her connection to the Hemings family, read Fawn Brodie's biography, Jefferson: An Intimate Portrait. She recognized Eston Hemings Jefferson's name in the book from family stories and contacted Brodie. The historian helped Jefferson start putting the pieces of the family history back together.

They discovered that in the 1940s, her father and his brothers had decided against continued telling of the Hemings-Jefferson story to their children, out of fear the younger people would be discriminated against. The family's new knowledge of their history enabled DNA researchers in 1998 to locate Jean's cousin, John Weeks Jefferson, a male descendant of Eston Hemings Jefferson, for testing. His Y-chromosome matched the rare haplotype of the Thomas Jefferson male line. The Carr male line did not match, partly calling into question the oral history of Thomas Jefferson Randolph that Peter Carr was the father of Sally Hemings' children. Whether or not the Carr male line matches Hemings' other children is unknown as DNA tests were only performed on a descendant of one of her children, Eston Hemings.

== Jefferson–Hemings controversy ==
Historians had long disputed accounts that Thomas Jefferson had a relationship with his mixed-race slave Sally Hemings and fathered children by her. In the late 20th century, historians began reanalyzing the body of evidence. In 1997, Annette Gordon-Reed published a book that analyzed the historiography and noted how historians since the 19th century had accepted accounts by Jefferson descendants while rejecting accounts by Madison Hemings, a son of Sally Hemings, and Israel Jefferson, another former slave at Monticello. Both said that Thomas Jefferson fathered Hemings' children. She said historians failed to adequately assess which version was supported by known facts.

A Y-DNA analysis in 1998 showed no match between the Carr male line, proposed for more than 150 years as the father(s) of the Hemings children, and the male Hemings descendant of Eston Jefferson tested. It did show a match between the Jefferson male line and the Eston Hemings descendant. Sally Hemings is believed to be the half-sister of Thomas Jefferson's wife Martha; her mother was Elizabeth Hemings, a mixed-race slave, and her father was John Wayles, also Martha's father.

Since 1998 and the DNA study, many historians have accepted that the widower Jefferson had a long intimate relationship with Hemings, and fathered six children with her, four of whom survived to adulthood. The Thomas Jefferson Foundation (TJF), which runs Monticello, and the National Genealogical Society conducted independent studies; their scholars concluded Jefferson was probably the father of all Hemings's children.

Critics, such as the Thomas Jefferson Heritage Society (TJHS) Scholars Commission (2001), have argued against the TJF report. They have concluded that there is insufficient evidence to determine that Jefferson was the father of Hemings's children. The TJHS report suggested that Jefferson's younger brother Randolph Jefferson could have been the father, and that Hemings may have had multiple partners. No previous accounts had suggested that. However, in his memoirs, Isaac Jefferson, a slave at Monticello, described Jefferson's younger brother as having socialized with the slaves at the plantation. He recounted that “Old Master’s brother, Mass Randall, was a mighty simple man: used to come out among black people, play the fiddle and dance half the night”.

In 2012, the Smithsonian Institution and the Thomas Jefferson Foundation held a major exhibit at the National Museum of American History: Slavery at Jefferson's Monticello: The Paradox of Liberty; it says that "most historians now believe that ... the evidence strongly support[s] the conclusion that a member of the Jefferson family was the father of Sally Hemings' children." The exhibit toured in Atlanta and Saint Louis into 2014 after leaving Washington.
