= Walter Beverly Pearson =

American businessman (1861–1917)

- Born: 2 December 1861; Madison, Wisconsin
- Died: 19 May 1917 (aged 55); Chicago, Illinois
- Resting place: Rosehill Cemetery and Mausoleum, Chicago, Illinois
- Occupation: President of Standard Screw Company
- Spouse: Helen Snyder
- Children: Frederick Beverly Pearson, Beatrice Pearson
- Parent(s): Anna Wayles Hemings Jefferson, Albert Pearson

Walter Beverly Pearson (December 2, 1861 – May 19, 1917) was an American inventor, industrialist and president of the Standard Screw Company. It became known as Stanadyne Automotive Corporation.

He is the great-grandson of President Thomas Jefferson and his slave Sally Hemings, as he was a descendant of their son Eston Hemings.

== Early life and education ==
Walter Pearson was born in Madison, Wisconsin during the American Civil War to Anna Wayles (Hemings) Jefferson (1837–1866) and her husband Albert T. Pearson (1829–1908) of New York state. Anna was a native of Virginia and the only surviving daughter of Eston Hemings Jefferson and his wife Julia Ann Isaacs. Albert worked as a carpenter in Madison; he served as a captain in the Union Army during the war. Walter had an older brother Fred and an older sister Julia. Their mother died prematurely, at the age of 30, when Walter was just four years old. The three children were educated in public schools.

Pearson's maternal grandfather Eston Hemings Jefferson was born into slavery at Monticello. Seven-eighths European in ancestry, he was legally white under Virginia law and freed in 1826 by the will of his master (and father) Thomas Jefferson. Julia Ann Isaacs, a free woman of color, was of African, European-American and German-Jewish descent. They moved their family from Ohio to Wisconsin in 1852 for added security after passage of the Fugitive Slave Act of 1850. Although all their family was free, slave catchers often kidnapped and enslaved free blacks in those years, as well as capturing fugitive slaves.

In 1852 the Hemings family had changed their surname to Jefferson and entered the white community in Madison, Wisconsin. Anna Jefferson was 16 that year. Both Anna and her brother Beverly Jefferson married white spouses, and all their descendants have identified as white.

== Career ==
Pearson had gone into business in Chicago. By the late 19th century, he operated a small manufacturing company that made screws and developed technology which made his company valuable enough to sell to Standard Screw (based in Connecticut) in 1900. When appointed as president in 1904, Pearson soon doubled the company's subsidiaries from four to eight, increasing their skilled workforce and facilities. He led Standard Screw Company to dominance in the industry through the early twentieth century. Together with two other leaders, Pearson introduced the " 'new Standard Automatic,' a machine that reduced the cost of making screws nearly 40 percent." In 1904 he reduced prices, which gave the company an edge with the new auto manufacturers, whose rapid expansion as an industry fed Standard's profits.

The coming of World War I led to a major increase in profits, as Pearson won contracts from the British and US governments for bullets and fuses. The 1916 profit was 10 times higher than the previous year, and returns increased by 340 percent in 1917. Pearson had established a dominance among companies that manufactured screw machine products; his skilled shops could make complex parts for many different industries, and held the edge for decades. Pearson was described as the company's "first outstanding leader."

== Marriage and family ==
Walter Pearson married Helena Snyder (her name was later anglicized to Helen; born in Illinois, she was the daughter of German immigrants.) Their children were Frederick Beverly Pearson (b. 22 May 1895) and Beatrice Pearson (b. 1 July 1905), born in Chicago and Michigan, respectively.

At his death in 1917, Pearson left an estate valued at $2,000,000 (~$32.2 million in 2024). The executors of his will were his wife Helen and his cousin Carl Jefferson, the son of his maternal uncle Beverly Jefferson. Pearson left a $50,000 annuity to his wife, $12,000 annuities to his daughter Beatrice and son Frederick, and a $50,000 bequest to his cousin Frederick Jefferson. Pearson's son Frederick was to receive $2 million, the bulk of the Pearson fortune, on his 35th birthday.

In 1920, the widow Helen Pearson and her children were living in Miami, Florida. Fred was working in real estate and Beatrice was still in school.

Frederick Pearson married Gladys Semma in 1922. She divorced him three years later because of his drinking problems. He died in Chicago at age 30 on February 20, 1926, in a fire at the Claridge Hotel. After a night of heavy drinking with friends; he had fallen asleep smoking a cigarette and a fire started in his room. By the time it was discovered, he could not be saved.

== Family ==
In 1974 the historian Fawn McKay Brodie published a biography of Thomas Jefferson in which she explored the evidence related to his alleged relationship with Sally Hemings. Her book Thomas Jefferson: An Intimate History (1974) noted that Jefferson was in residence at Monticello for the conception period of each of Hemings' children, and that Sally Hemings never conceived when he was not there. Her book met mixed reactions: excellent reviews from literary critics and opposition to her psychological approach and conclusions about Jefferson's paternity from mainline biographers of the president.

After she published her biography, descendants of Carl Jefferson (a grandson of Eston Hemings Jefferson) read it and contacted her. Their knowledge of the family connection to Thomas Jefferson had been lost in the 1940s, as the Jefferson brothers decided not to pass on the story, for fear their children would face racial discrimination because of descent from the slave Sally Hemings. The senior Jeffersons instead told their children that they were descended from an uncle of Jefferson.

In 1976 Brodie published an article in American Heritage magazine about the grandchildren of Sally Hemings and Thomas Jefferson, and covered the Pearson family. A 1998 DNA study found that a male descendant of Eston Hemings Jefferson matched the rare Y-chromosome of the Jefferson male line. Most historians took this result as affirming other historical evidence related to the paternity issue, and have acknowledged that the president and Sally Hemings had a 38-year relationship in which he fathered her six children of record. While some historians disagree, most Jeffersonian scholarship has changed to incorporate this. Pearson and his Jefferson cousins were great-grandchildren of Thomas Jefferson.

As the Monticello Website says:

Through his celebrity as the eloquent spokesman for liberty and equality as well as the ancestor of people living on both sides of the color line, Jefferson has left a unique legacy for descendants of Monticello's enslaved people as well as for all Americans.

In 2012 the Smithsonian and Monticello collaborated on an exhibit entitled Slavery at Jefferson's Monticello: The Paradox of Liberty, which explored several slave families and their descendants, including the Hemingses.
