= Madison Hemings =

American freed slave (1805–1877)

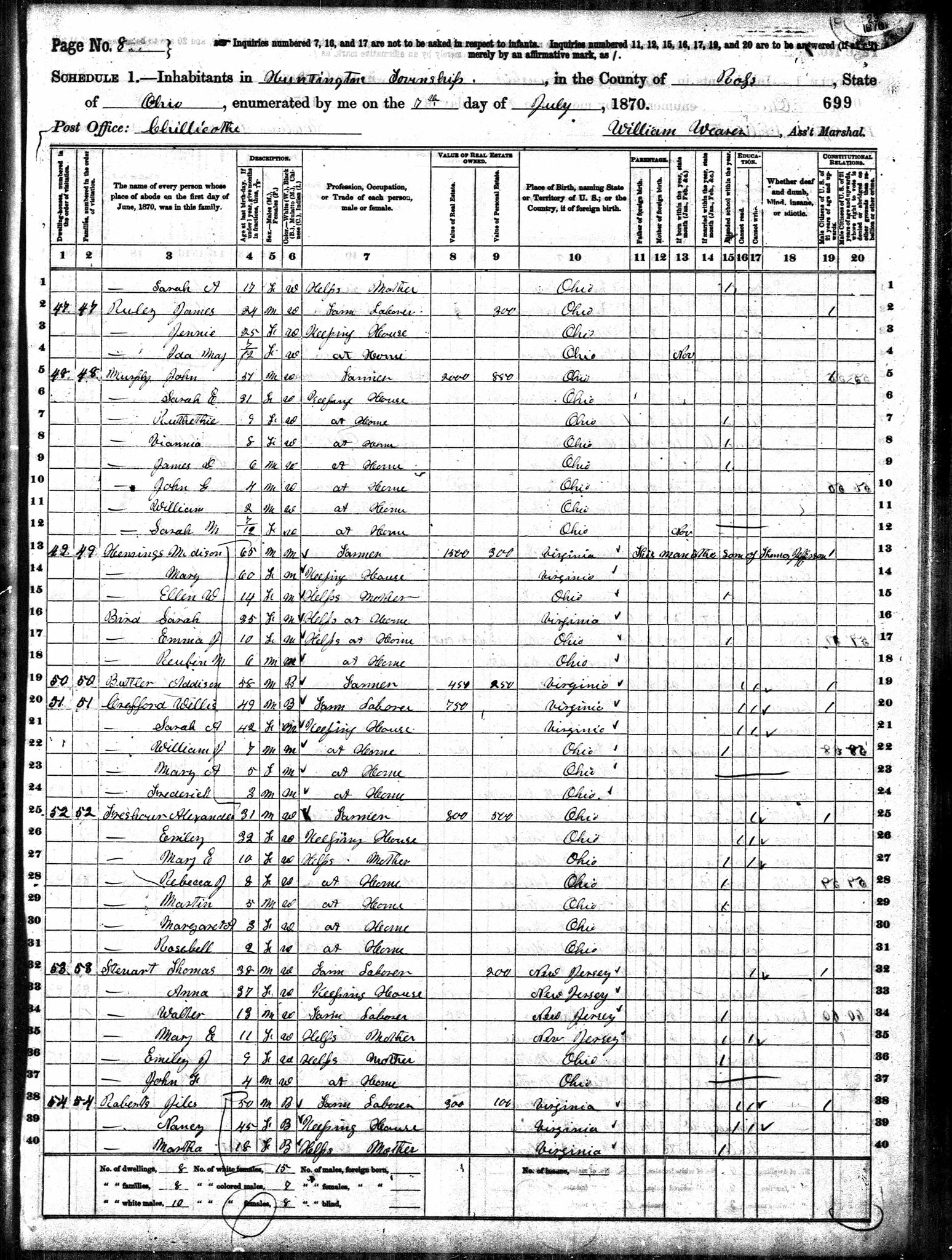
- 1870 federal census of Ross County, Ohio; enumerator broke protocol to note of Madison Hemings, "This man is the son of Thomas Jefferson."
- Born: Madison Hemings; January 19, 1805; Monticello, Charlottesville, Virginia, U.S.
- Died: November 28, 1877 (aged 72); Ross County, Ohio
- Occupations: Fine woodworker; farmer
- Known for: Son of Thomas Jefferson and Sally Hemings
- Spouse: Mary Hughes McCoy (m. 1831; died 1876)
- Children: 10
- Parent(s): Sally Hemings; Thomas Jefferson
- Relatives: Beverly Hemings (brother), Harriet Hemings (sister), Eston Hemings (brother), Betty Hemings (grandmother)

James Madison Hemings (January 19, 1805 – November 28, 1877) was the son of Sally Hemings, a mixed race enslaved woman, and her enslaver Thomas Jefferson, the third president of the United States. Additional samples of Thomas Jefferson's hair were identified in the 21st century and were used to create a Jefferson DNA profile, against which those of known descendants were compared. The later DNA testing conclusively proved that Jefferson fathered Sally Hemings' sons, Madison and Eston. He was the third of Sally Hemings's four children to survive to adulthood.

Enslaved since birth, in accord with the legal doctrine of partus sequitur ventrem, Hemings grew up on Jefferson's Monticello plantation, where his mother was also enslaved. After some light duties as a young boy, Hemings became a carpenter and fine woodwork apprentice at around age 14 and worked in the joiner's shop until he was about 21. He learned to play the violin and was able to earn money by growing cabbages. Jefferson died in 1826 and Madison was freed in his will, after which Sally Hemings was "given her time" (an informal freedom) by Jefferson's surviving daughter Martha Jefferson Randolph.

The historical question of whether Jefferson was the father of Sally Hemings's children has been the subject of the Jefferson–Hemings controversy. At the age of 68, Hemings claimed the connection in an 1873 Ohio newspaper interview, titled, "Life Among the Lowly," which attracted national and international attention. Following renewed historical analysis in the late 20th century, and a 1998 DNA study (completed in 1999 and published as a report in 2000) that found a match between the Jefferson male line and a descendant of Sally Hemings's youngest son, Eston Hemings, the Monticello Foundation asserted that Jefferson fathered Eston and likely her other five children as well.

After Hemings and his younger brother Eston were freed, they each worked and married free women of color; they lived with their families and mother Sally in Charlottesville until her death in 1835. Both brothers moved with their young families to Chillicothe, Ohio to live in a free state. Hemings and his wife Mary lived there the remainder of their lives; he worked as a farmer and highly skilled carpenter. Among their ten children were two sons who served the Union Army in the Civil War, both of whom enlisted as white men in the regular army.

Among Madison and Mary Hemings's grandchildren was Frederick Madison Roberts, the first African American elected to office on the West Coast. He served in the California legislature for nearly two decades. In 2010, their descendant Shay Banks-Young, who identifies as African American, together with one Wayles and one Hemings descendant, each of whom identify as European American, received the international "Search for Common Ground" award for work among the Jefferson descendants and the public to bridge gaps and heal "the legacy of slavery." They founded "The Monticello Community" for descendants of all of the people who lived and worked there in Jefferson's lifetime.

== Slavery ==
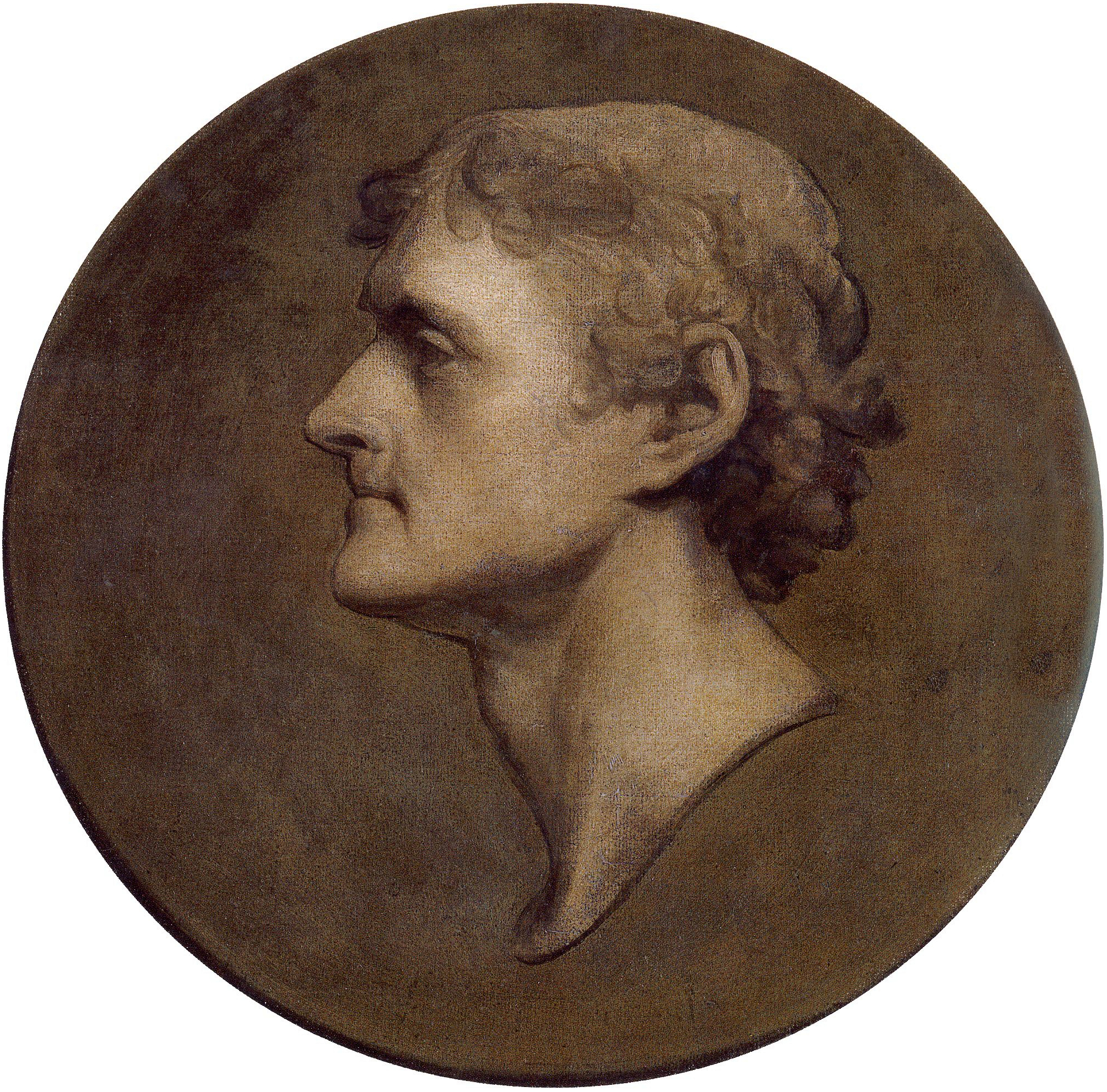
Gilbert Stuart, Thomas Jefferson Medallion Portrait, 1805, the year that Madison Hemings was born

Madison Hemings was born into slavery at Monticello, where his mother Sally Hemings was a mixed-race enslaved woman inherited by Martha Wayles Skelton, the wife of Thomas Jefferson. Sally and Martha were half-sisters, both fathered by the planter John Wayles. (Note: As the historians Philip D. Morgan and Joshua D. Rothman have written, there were numerous interracial relationships in the Wayles-Hemings-Jefferson families, Albemarle County and Virginia, often with multiple generations repeating the pattern.) Sally worked in the main house as a domestic servant. Jefferson's wife Martha died on September 6, 1782. While in Paris, from 1787 to 1789, Sally Hemings cared for Jefferson's daughters. She lived her teenage years as a free person in France, where there was no slavery. According to Hemings's memoir, his mother told him that his father was Thomas Jefferson, and that their relationship had started in Paris, where he was serving as a diplomat, having been appointed the Minister to France in 1784. Pregnant, she agreed to return with Jefferson to the United States based on his promise to free her children when they came of age at 21. Sally returned to Monticello and remained a domestic servant in the main house and she also became Jefferson's chambermaid. Her living quarters, located in the South Wing of Monticello, adjacent to Jefferson's bedchamber, were built in 1809. Although there was no window to the outside, it likely gave her and her children a higher-level lifestyle than other enslaved people at Monticello.

Hemings referred to Sally Hemings as "mother" and Jefferson as "father", who treated one another with respect. Hemings described Jefferson as even-tempered and "uniformly kind". He compared Jefferson's affectionate treatment of his white grandchildren to that of the Hemings children, who were not treated with affection or partiality. Henry Wiencek asserts that, while Jefferson felt no emotion when he saw "eternal monotony" in the faces of black-skinned enslaved people, seeing himself in the faces of the Hemings children, whom he enslaved, caused him to remain emotionally distant from his off-spring with Sally.

Hemings grew up at Monticello with an older brother Beverley, older sister Harriet, and a younger brother Eston. Two or more other siblings died young. Sally and her four surviving children were listed together in Jefferson's Farm Book at Monticello in 1810. The children were fair-skinned and some bore a remarkable resemblance to Jefferson. Jefferson's grandchildren were not told that they were related to the Hemings children.

Nothing about the Sally Hemings-Thomas Jefferson story makes sense unless the whiteness of the Hemings family is emphasized. "Negro blood" by itself did not make anyone a slave. It was the maternal descent rule of partus sequitur ventrem (the offspring of a slave belongs to the owner of the mother) that enslaved a person — if the maternal slave line was unbroken by legal manumission.

— "Jefferson and Hemings", Washington Post

Our canon considers two crosses with the pure white, and a third with any degree of mixture, however small, as clearing the issue of the Negro blood. But observe, that this does not reestablish freedom, which depends on the condition of the mother, the principle of the civil law, partus sequitur ventrem being adopted here.

— Thomas Jefferson

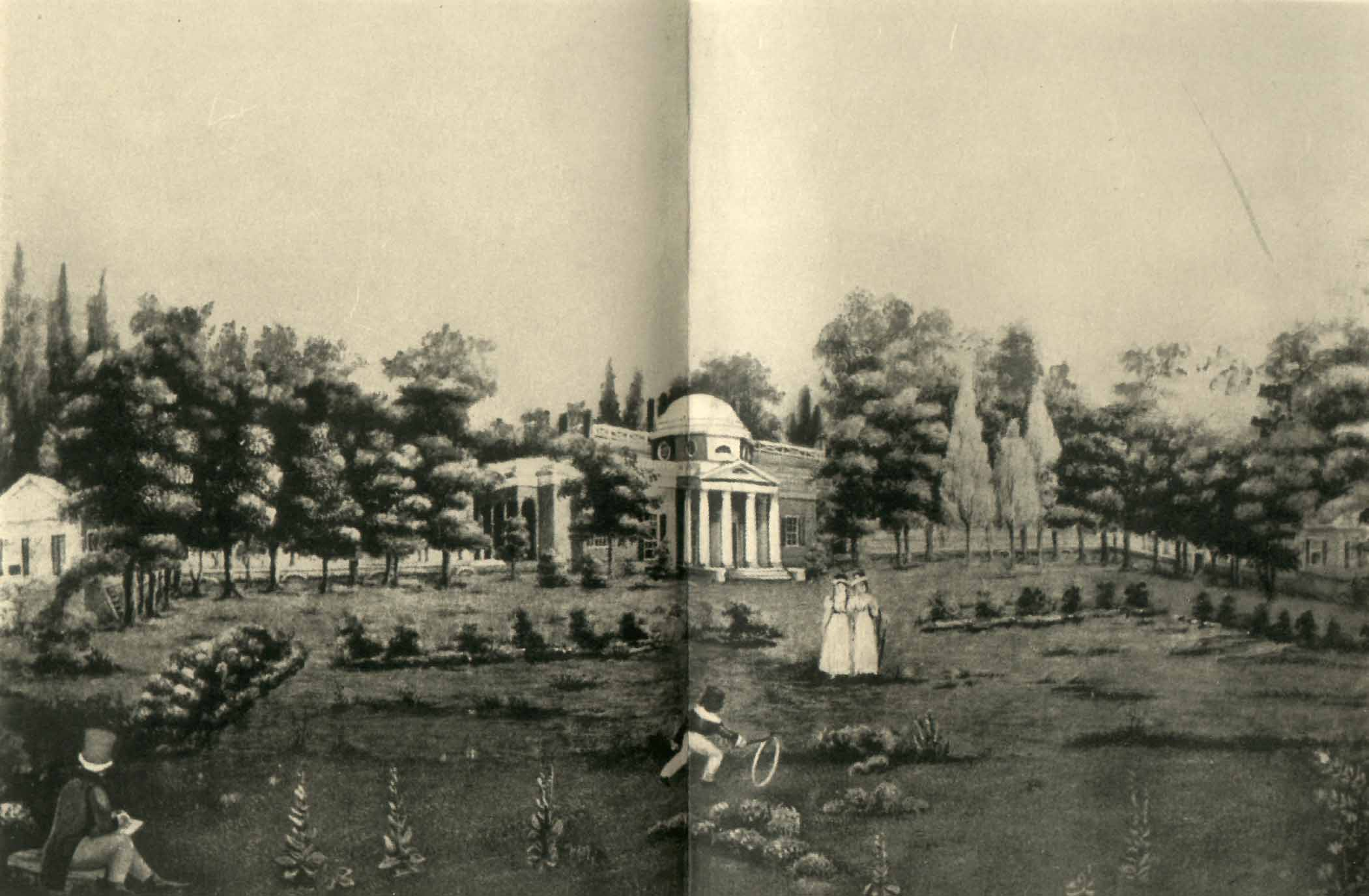
Monticello from the book The Bloom of Monticello, 1826, the year of Thomas Jefferson's death and the year before Hemings was freed

Hemings was named for Jefferson's close friend, James Madison. According to Hemings, Dolley Madison requested the honor of his being named after her husband, who was afterwards President of the United States. As a young child, Hemings and his siblings stayed in or near the main house, sometimes running errands. Unlike other enslaved children, they had light work, were able to stay near their mother, and knew that they would be freed upon coming of age. Hemings learned to read and write from white children and was partially self-taught. At the age of 12 or 14, Hemings was apprenticed to his uncle, Sally's brother John Hemings, to learn carpentry and fine woodworking. Beverley and Eston were also apprentices. The brothers worked in the joiner's shop at Poplar Forest and Monticello in total from 1810 to 1826. By 1824, Jefferson gave Hemings and his younger brother a patch of land to grow vegetables. At harvest, the boys were paid for 100 heads of cabbage. All three of the Hemings brothers learned to play the violin, the instrument associated with Jefferson. As an adult, Eston Hemings made a living as a musician. Their sister, Harriet, learned to weave.

Hemings stated that Beverley and Harriet moved to Washington D.C. in 1822 when they "ran away" from Monticello. Jefferson ensured that Harriet was given $50 (equivalent to $1,209 in 2025) for her journey to Washington, D.C. Because of their light skin and appearance (they were 7/8 European or octoroon), both identified with the white community and probably changed their names. After Beverley had left, Jefferson updated his Farm Book with his name and "runaway 22". Harriet's leaving was similarly recorded. Hemings said they had married white spouses of good circumstances, and moved into white society. They apparently kept their paternity a secret, as it would have revealed their origins as slaves.

== Freedom ==
According to the terms of Jefferson's will, twenty-one-year-old Madison Hemings and his brother Eston were emancipated in 1827. As stipulated in Jefferson's will, the state legislature was petitioned to allow the brothers, their mother, and Joseph Fossett to remain in the state after the one-year residency limit for freedmen. The Hemings rented a house in Charlottesville, where Sally lived with them. At the age of 50, she was considered an old woman in the slave trade. She was not formally freed but was "given her time" by Jefferson's surviving daughter Martha Jefferson Randolph, who was also Hemings's niece. Sally Heming's children were the only family unit freed (or helped to escape) by Jefferson, and the only young people freed as they came of age. In the 1830 Albemarle County census, Madison, Eston and Sally Hemings were all classified as free whites, sometimes they were classified as mixed race. Sally Hemings died in Charlotte in 1835. During their time in Charlottesville, Hemings had built a wood-and-brick house on Main Street.

== Married life ==
On November 21, 1831, Madison wed Mary Hughes McCoy, a free woman of mixed-race ancestry. McCoy's grandfather Samuel Hughes, a white planter, freed her grandmother Chana from slavery and had children with her.

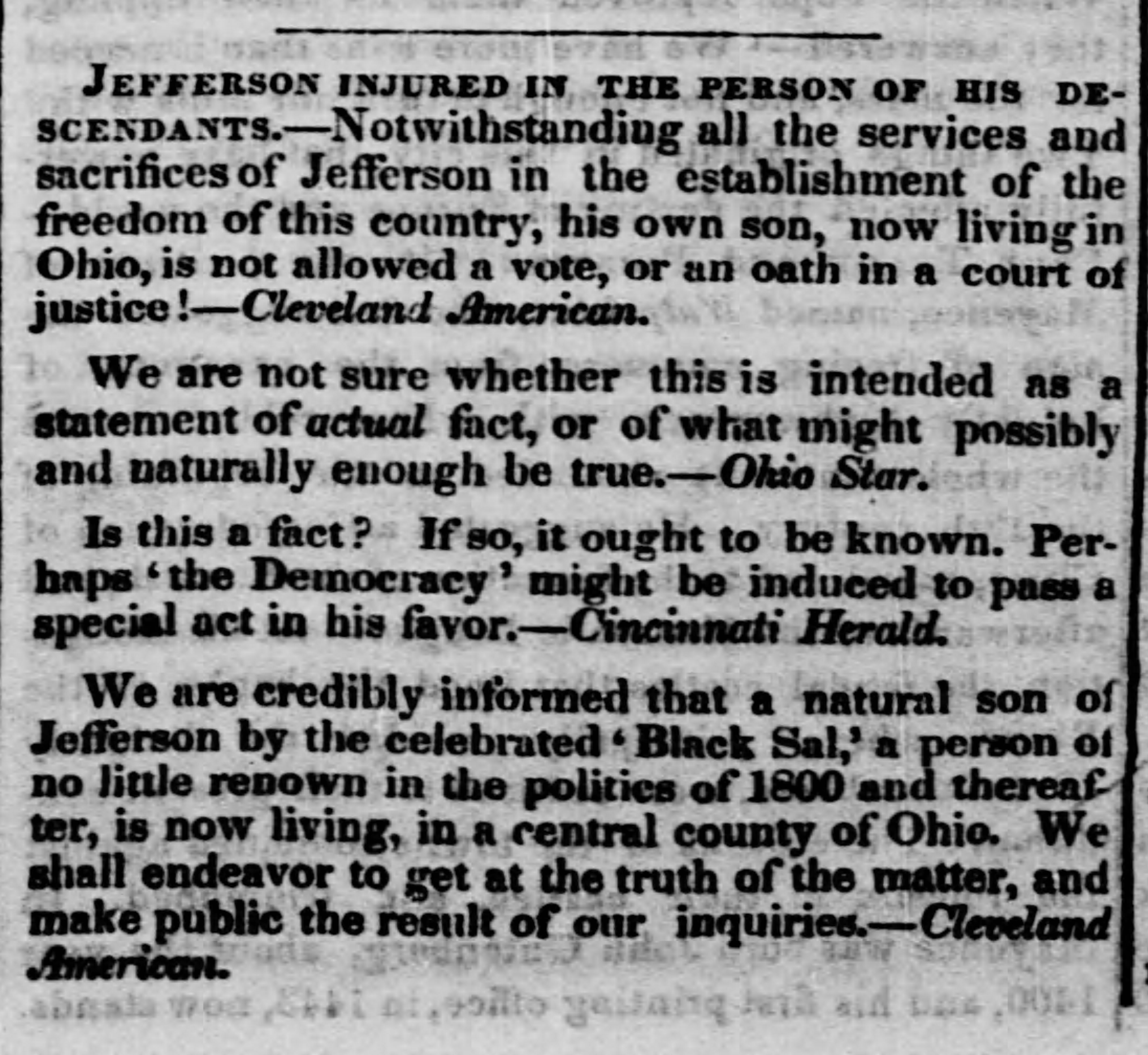
The Liberator about the connection between the Hemings family in Ohio and Thomas Jefferson, 1845

In 1836, Hemings, Mary, and their infant daughter Sarah left Charlottesville for Pike County, Ohio. Eston and his family—and Mary's family—had already moved there. They lived in Chillicothe, which had a thriving free black community, abolitionists among both races, and a station of the Underground Railroad, helping escapees from slavery in the South. Surviving records in Pike County state that Hemings purchased 25 acres (100,000 m^{2}) for $150 on July 22, 1856, sold the same area for $250 on December 30, 1859, and purchased 66 acres (270,000 m^{2}) for $10 per acre on September 25, 1865 in Ross County, Ohio. During that time, Hemings helped build houses in Waverly, Ohio, which was known for its anti-black sentiment.

Madison and Mary Hemings were the parents of ten children:

- an unnamed son - died young before they moved to Ohio.
- Sarah Hemings (1835–1884) - married Reuben Byrd, and had three children.
- Thomas Eston Hemings (1839–1865) a Civil War soldier who died in capture, died unmarried.
- Harriet Hemings (1842–1926) - married Civil War veterans, James Butler, and Henry Spears. She had three children with her first husband James Butler.
- Mary Ann Hemings (1843–1921) - married David Johnson, had two children.
- Catherine Jane Hemings (1844–1880) - married George Washington Hale, had four children.
- William Beverly Hemings (1845–1910) - a Civil War veteran, died unmarried.
- James Madison Hemings (1849–1922) - died unmarried.
- Julia Ann Hemings (1851–1867) - died young, and unmarried.
- Ellen Wayles Hemings (1856–1940) - married Andrew Jackson Roberts, and had three children.

Their daughter Sarah was born in Virginia; the rest of the children were born in Ohio. Hemings had a quiet life as a modestly successful free black farmer and carpenter.

Following passage of the Fugitive Slave Act of 1850, Eston and his family moved in 1852 to Madison, Wisconsin, to get further from possible danger from slave catchers. Slave catchers were known to kidnap free black people and sell them into slavery, as demand and prices were high in the Deep South. (Note: In Wisconsin, Eston and his family all took the surname Jefferson and entered the white community. They lived according to their appearance and mostly white ancestry. Their oldest son John Wayles Jefferson served as a regular Union officer in the American Civil War, and was promoted to colonel. Their son Beverly also served in the Union Army and married a white woman. Their daughter Anna married a white man. All of Eston's descendants identified as white.) Eston lived as a white man in Wisconsin. Of Sally Hemings's children, Hemings was the only one that lived among African Americans after he attained his freedom. (In September 1831, in his mid-twenties, Madison Hemings was described in a special census of the State of Virginia as being: 5 feet 7 3/8 inches high light complexion no scars or marks perceivable". Forty-two years later, a journalist described him as "five feet ten inches in height, sparely made, with sandy complexion and a mild gray eye.")

In 1873, Hemings used an Ohio newspaper interview about his life, titled, "Life Among the Lowly", to address the Jefferson/Hemings controversy, stating that Jefferson was his and his three siblings' father. Hemings was a widower when he died of consumption on November 28, 1877, in Huntington Township, Ross County, Ohio.

== Jefferson–Hemings controversy ==
External videos
- Booknotes interview with Gordon-Reed on Thomas Jefferson and Sally Hemings, February 21, 1999, C-SPAN

Sally Hemings had at least six children whose births were recorded. Some sources, including Hemings's memoir, says that Sally Hemings conceived her first child while in Paris with Jefferson, but that the baby died shortly after birth. Another daughter named Harriet, whose birth was recorded at the time, also died shortly after birth, but four other children lived to adulthood, three boys and one girl: Beverly, Harriet (the second daughter given this name), Madison, and Eston. Beverly and Harriet left Monticello to go North when they were both around twenty-one years of age, but Madison and Eston were freed by Jefferson's will after he died. Although Jefferson did not legally manumit Beverly and Harriet, he secretly arranged and paid for Harriet's transportation to Philadelphia, using his overseer Edmund Bacon as an intermediary. Although he marked in his Farm Book that both had "run away," Jefferson never made any attempt to re-enslave them. Gordon-Reed noted that this Hemings family was the only one in which all the children were freed, and Harriet the only enslaved woman he freed. She suggests this special treatment was significant and related to their status as his "natural" children.

Largely as a result of revived interest in this case following Gordon-Reed's book, a Y-DNA analysis of Carr, Jefferson, and Hemings descendants was conducted in 1998. Y-DNA is passed on virtually unchanged through the direct male line. It showed no match between the Carr male line, proposed for more than 150 years as the father(s), and the one Hemings descendant tested. It did show a match between the Y-DNA haplotype of the Jefferson male line and the Hemings descendant, which is a rare type.

Since 1998 and the DNA study, which affirmed the historical evidence, many historians have accepted that the widower Jefferson had a long, sexual relationship with Hemings, and fathered six children with her, four of whom survived to adulthood. The Thomas Jefferson Foundation (TJF), which runs Monticello, conducted an independent historic review in 2000, as did the National Genealogical Society in 2001; the scholars of both reviews concluded Jefferson was probably the father of all Hemings's children. (Note: Critics, such as the Thomas Jefferson Heritage Society (TJHS) Scholars Commission (2001), have argued against these conclusions. They have concluded that there is insufficient evidence to determine that Jefferson was the father of Hemings's children. The TJHS report, which was not peer-reviewed, suggested that Jefferson's younger brother Randolph Jefferson could have been the father. This alternative was at one time recounted by twentieth-century descendants of Eston Hemings who were classified as white. Their fathers were trying to shield them from racism. The TJHS report also suggested that Hemings may have had multiple partners.)

There are no living male-line descendants of Madison Hemings. Beverley Hemings's descendants have been lost to history, as he apparently changed his name after moving to Washington, DC and passing into white society. Descendants of Madison Hemings declined to have the remains of his son William Hemings disturbed to extract DNA for testing (he was buried in the Leavenworth National Cemetery), just as Wayles-Jefferson descendants declined to have Thomas Jefferson's remains disturbed.

In 2012, the Smithsonian Institution and the Thomas Jefferson Foundation held a major exhibit at the National Museum of American History: Slavery at Jefferson's Monticello: The Paradox of Liberty. It said that "evidence strongly support[s] the conclusion that Jefferson was the father of Sally Hemings's children."

== Descendants ==
Madison Hemings's youngest daughter, Ellen Wayles Hemings, married Andrew Jackson Roberts, a graduate of Oberlin College. They moved from Ohio to Los Angeles, California, in 1885 with their first son Frederick, age six. The senior Roberts founded the first black-owned mortuary there and became a civic leader in the developing community. Their son, Frederick Madison Roberts, named for his maternal grandfather, was college-educated and became a businessman in partnership with his father. He also became a community leader. In 1918 Roberts was first elected to the California legislature. He was re-elected numerous times, serving for a total of 16 years, and becoming known as "dean of the assembly". He is believed to have been the first person of African American ancestry elected to political office west of the Mississippi River. Both he and his brother William Giles Roberts graduated from college. The Roberts descendants for generations have had a strong tradition of college education and public service. Their daughter Mary Ann Johnson left the state of Ohio, but the remainder of their children stayed in southern Ohio.

The experiences of descendants of both Madison and Eston Hemings illustrate the benefits and costs of passing for white. None of Madison Hemings's sons married. William Beverly Hemings served in a white regiment--the 73rd Ohio--in the Civil War and died alone in a Kansas veterans hospital in 1910. His brother James Madison Hemings seems to have slipped back and forth across the color line, and may be the source of stories among his sisters' descendants of a mysterious and silent visitor who looked like a white man, with white beard and blue eyes. Several of Madison Hemings's grandsons also passed for white, divorcing themselves from their sisters who stayed on the other side of the line. Passing was not always permanent. Intermittent passing became a strategy for securing anything from a job to a haircut. Their racial identities calibrated by the day or hour, light-skinned members of the Hemings family were white in the workplace and black at home, or they borrowed a white surname to make a hairdressing appointment in a neighboring town.

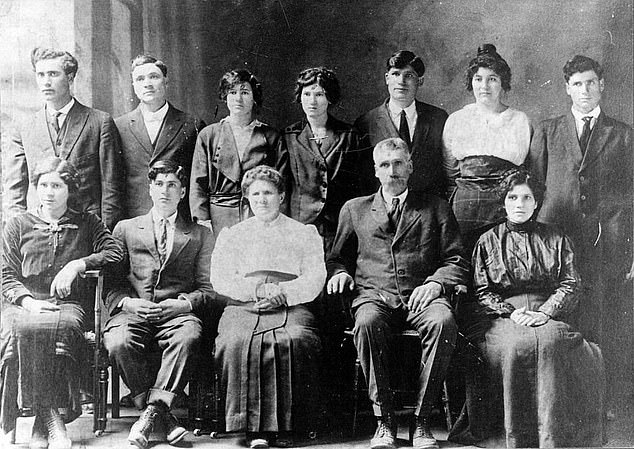
Madison Hemings's granddaughter Emma Boyd Young and her family, ca. 1915

Many of the Hemings's descendants who remained in Ohio were interviewed in the late 20th century by two Monticello researchers as part of the Thomas Jefferson Foundation's "Getting Word" project. They were collecting oral histories from the descendants of enslaved families at Monticello; material has been added to the Monticello website and was included in the national Slavery at Jefferson's Monticello 2012 exhibit. The researchers found that Hemings's descendants had married within the mixed-race community for generations, choosing light-skinned spouses of an educated class and identifying as people of color within the black community.

In 2010, Shay Banks-Young and Julia Jefferson Westerinen, descendants of Sally Hemings who identify as black and white, respectively, were honored together with David Works, a descendant of Martha Wayles Skelton Jefferson, with the Search for Common Ground award for "their work to bridge the divide within their family and heal the legacy of slavery." They have spoken about race and their historically divided and united family and have been featured on NPR and in other interviews across the country. (Note: In June 2016, Shay Banks-Young died. Mention of her death was announced on the Monticello website.)

== Bibliography ==
- Brodie, Fawn McKay (1974). Thomas Jefferson: An Intimate History. W. W. Norton & Company. ISBN 978-0-393-31752-7.
- Gordon-Reed, Annette (1998). Thomas Jefferson and Sally Hemings: An American Controversy. University of Virginia Press. ISBN 978-0-8139-1833-4.
- Gordon-Reed, Annette (2009). The Hemingses of Monticello: An American Family. W. W. Norton & Company. ISBN 978-0-393-33776-1.
- Wiencek, Henry (2012). Master of the Mountain: Thomas Jefferson and His Slaves. Farrar, Straus and Giroux. ISBN 978-1-4668-2778-3.
