= William Beverly Hemings =

Son of Sally Hemings (1798–c. 1873)

- Born: April 1, 1798; Monticello, Albemarle County, Virginia, U.S.
- Died: c. 1873
- Known for: Son of Sally Hemings; widely believed to be the son of Thomas Jefferson
- Mother: Sally Hemings
- Relatives: Madison Hemings (brother); Eston Hemings (brother); Harriet Hemings (sister); John Wayles Jefferson (nephew)

William Beverly Hemings (April 1, 1798 – 1873), also referred to by family members as Beverley, was the son of Sally Hemings, an enslaved woman at Monticello, and widely believed to be the eldest son of Thomas Jefferson, the third President of the United States. He was one of four Hemings children to survive to adulthood and was part of the large enslaved Hemings family closely associated with Jefferson.

Additional samples of Thomas Jefferson's hair were identified in the 21st century and were used to create a Jefferson DNA profile, against which those of known descendants of Hemings’ younger brothers, Madison Hemings and Eston Hemings, were compared. The later DNA testing conclusively proved that Jefferson fathered both Madison and Eston Hemings. Descendants of Hemings and his sister, Harriet Hemings, who both reportedly married white spouses and lived as white, have not thus far been identified.

== Early life ==
Hemings was born at Monticello in Albemarle County, Virginia, on April 1, 1798. His mother, Sally Hemings, was a slave of mixed ancestry, the half-sister of Jefferson’s wife, Martha Wayles Skelton Jefferson. Contemporary accounts and later research suggest that Hemings and his siblings were afforded relatively privileged status compared with other slaves at Monticello, including training, lighter work, and eventual de facto freedom.

In his Farm Book, Thomas Jefferson listed Beverley among the plantation's skilled tradesmen, specifically as a carpenter. Plantation records and correspondence between Jefferson and his principal overseer Edmund Bacon, indicate that he was apprenticed to his uncle, the skilled master Joiner John Hemings, from the age of fourteen. In this role, he is believed to have assisted in the plantation's cooperage (barrel-making) and, more significantly, in the construction and fine woodworking at Jefferson's second plantation home and periodic retreat, Poplar Forest in Bedford County, Virginia, about 80 miles to the southwest.

As was true of several others in the Hemings lineage, Beverley was also a musician, occasionally called upon to play violin for dances arranged by Jefferson's granddaughters.

== Adulthood and passing into white society ==
In keeping with Jefferson’s practice regarding Hemings’ children, Beverley was allowed to leave Monticello without pursuit when he came of age. Although he was never formally manumitted he was, as was said then, "Given his time" and permitted to leave the plantation as a free person. Unlike his younger brothers Madison and Eston, who identified as Black later in life, Beverley reportedly chose to assimilate into white society, marrying a woman of European descent, and raising a family whose descendants identified as white. Apart from certain U.S. Census records, his later life in Washington D.C., and also possibly in the State of Maryland, was lived outside the public record, with relatively limited detail.

== Family background ==
The Hemings family held a unique position at Monticello. Sally Hemings’ mother, Elizabeth "Betty" Hemings, and her many descendants formed a large enslaved kinship network within Jefferson’s household, both at Monticello and Poplar Forest. William Beverly Hemings was one of six known children born to Sally Hemings, only four of which survived to adulthood; his siblings were Harriet (I and II), James Madison Hemings, and Thomas Eston Hemings. In his 1873 memoir, Madison Hemings stated that Thomas Jefferson was the father of all of Sally Hemings’ surviving children.

In that same memoir, Madison goes on to explain how their sister Harriet was also permitted to leave Monticello, having been, in fact, assisted in doing so by her renowned father. She too ultimately joined her brother Beverley there at Washington City where she likewise proceeded to pass undetected into the majority society, marry and raise a family there, unbeknownst to any others as the former slave girl Harriet Hemings of Monticello.

== Death ==
Beverley Hemings is believed to have died around 1873, though documentation is limited.

== Legacy ==
Interest in William Beverly Hemings and his siblings grew significantly in the late twentieth and early twenty-first centuries, following the Monticello community’s work to integrate the history of slavery into the site’s interpretation. The 1998 Y-DNA study published in Britain's Nature science journal linked the Jefferson male line with Eston Hemings’ descendants, further supporting accounts that Jefferson fathered Sally Hemings’ children. His life illustrates the complex intersections of race, slavery, freedom, and identity in early America.

== See also ==
- Hemings
- Sally Hemings
- Madison Hemings
- Eston Hemings
- John Wayles Jefferson
- Jefferson–Hemings controversy
- Monticello
