= Joshua D. Rothman =

American historian

- Born: Joshua Daniel Rothma

Academic background
- Education: BA, 1994, Cornell University; MA, 1995 and PhD, 2000, University of Virginia
- Thesis: Notorious in the neighborhood: interracial sex and interracial families in early national and antebellum Virginia (2000)
- Doctoral advisor: Edward L. Ayers and Peter S. Onuf

Academic work
- Institutions: University of Alabama

Joshua Daniel Rothman (/ˈrɒθmən/) is an American historian. He is a professor of history and Associate Provost for Academic and Administrative Affairs at the University of Alabama.

== Early life and education ==
Rothman earned his Bachelor of Arts degree from Cornell University before enrolling at the University of Virginia for his PhD.

== Career ==
Upon earning his PhD, Rothman joined the department of history at the University of Alabama as an assistant professor. In this role, he published his first book on the history of interracial sex in Virginia before the Civil War titled Notorious in the Neighborhood, Sex and Families Across the Color Line in Virginia, 1787-1861. The book discusses how the fluidity of sexual interracial relationships occurred during times when society and law clashed. Rothman explores how white supremacy was rampant in Virginia while society simultaneously accepted interracial relationships such as Thomas Jefferson and Sally Hemings. Following the publication of Notorious in the Neighborhood, he received an American Antiquarian Society-National Endowment For the Humanities Fellowship to conduct research for a book on American expansion to the cotton frontiers of the Old Southwest. The book was later published as Flush Times and Fever Dreams: A Story of Capitalism and Slavery in the Age of Jackson in 2012 through the University of Georgia Press. It went on to receive the Gulf South Historical Association’s Michael V.R. Thomason Book Award for the best book on the history of the Gulf South and Southern Historical Association’s Frank L. and Harriet C. Owsley Award for the best book in southern history.

Following the publication of his book, Rothman continued to serve as director of the Frances S. Summersell Center for the Study of the South, where he received an $18,000 grant from the Southern Foodways Alliance to research barbeques in the South. Since barbecue are a major aspect of the Southern lifestyle, he wished to study how barbecue became a cultural phenomenon and how the cuisine developed over time. He also co-directed a research project with colleagues at Cornell University and the University of New Orleans titled Freedom on the Move: A Database of Fugitives from North American Slavery. Their project, which received a $300,000 grant from the National Endowment for the Humanities, aimed to digitize every advertisement for a runaway slave in North American newspapers. As a result of his overall academic research, Rothman was appointed Chair of Alabama's department of history in 2016. In 2019, Rothman accepted an American Council of Learned Societies Fellowship to conduct research for his newest book, The Ledger and the Chain: How Domestic Slave Traders Shaped America.

== Bibliography ==
- Notorious in the Neighborhood, Sex and Families Across the Color Line in Virginia, 1787-1861, Chapel Hill, University of North Carolina Press, 2003, ISBN 9780807827680.
- Flush Times and Fever Dreams: A Story of Capitalism and Slavery in the Age of Jackson, University of Georgia Press, 2012, ISBN 9780820346816.
- The Ledger and the Chain: How Domestic Slave Traders Shaped America. New York, Basic Books, 2021, ISBN 9781541616615.
