= Edmund Bacon (1785–1866) =

American business manager

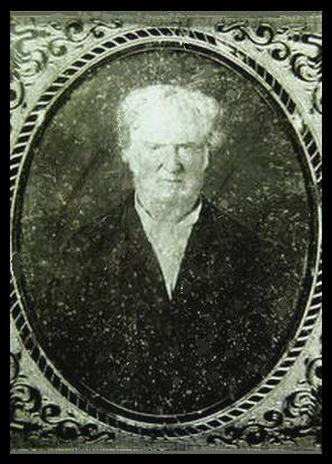
Photo of Edmund Bacon in later life

Edmund Bacon (1785–1866), was the business manager and primary overseer for 20 years for Thomas Jefferson, third President of the United States, at Monticello. Among some of his other business duties, Bacon supervised the daily chores and activities of farming and ranching at Monticello along with Jefferson's nail forge. His duties included supervising and providing supplies and other needs for Jefferson's slaves. When he retired, Bacon moved to Kentucky and was discovered by the author Rev. Hamilton Pierson, who made use of his memoirs and letters to write a book about Jefferson's personal life and character. The memoirs of Bacon's life at Monticello has given much insight into the daily activities there, as well as into Jefferson's life and personality.

== Biography ==
Edmund Bacon was born March 28, 1785, within a couple of miles of Monticello. He recalled memories of "Mr. Jefferson" as far back as he could remember. Bacon's father and Jefferson were raised together and attended the same school during their youth. His older brother William was in charge of Monticello during the four years Jefferson was away overseas as Minister to France. When Jefferson became president, he inquired of Bacon's father if William was again interested in being overseer at Monticello, but, being older and involved in other pursuits the offer no longer appealed to his as it once did. Jefferson knew that the senior Bacon's sons were all industrious and hard workers and so, in spite of Edmund's youth, Jefferson offered him the job, which the young Edmund gladly accepted.

=== Overseer ===
Bacon became Jefferson's primary overseer and business manager, working at Monticello beginning September 29, 1806 until 1822. He lived with his family in a modest house near the base of Monticello mountain. The home was close to Jefferson's nail forge (called a nailry) and several cabins belonging to slave families, all situated along a carriage road approximately a mile down the same road that passed along the Monticello estate and plantation grounds.

Bacon was a meticulous, frugal and punctual overseer, and kept a close watch over the daily activities at Monticello. At times he would even politely challenge Jefferson's instructions or advice as to how various activities and business should be conducted. When guests came to stay he looked after their needs and took care of and fed their horses. He was once scolded by Jefferson because he was rationing feed for their horses trying to cut costs. During the entire time Bacon was in Jefferson's employ, he had permission to contact Jefferson at any time, even in his sleeping quarters if business required. However, Bacon in an interview claimed that in the twenty years of his employment, he only twice had to disturb Jefferson after he retired for the evening.

Aside from his pay, Bacon as an overseer was given an allowance of provisions for a year which included six hundred pounds of pork, two barrels of wheat flour and all the corn meal he wanted. He also had his own vegetable garden on the grounds that he maintained during his free time.

When Jefferson retired in 1809 he had accumulated many possessions while in Washington, which included a huge collection of books. Organizing and packing these things was a great task. Jefferson summoned Bacon to come to Washington with two servants to help him pack, load and supervise the transport of these things back to Monticello. Together they loaded about thirty crates which would be sent back to Monticello by water. The remaining items were loaded into three wagons which Bacon brought up from Monticello and along with the servants drove them back to Jefferson's estate, departing Washington on March ninth or tenth. (Note: According to Bacon's memoirs they departed on March 3rd.) Jefferson followed him on Saturday, the eleventh. Bacon later recalled the event in his memoirs.

'I had three wagons from Monticello -- two six mule teams loaded with boxes, and the other four sorrel Chickasaw horses, and the wagon pretty much loaded with shrubbery from Maine's nursery. The servants rode on these wagons. I had the carriage horses and carriage, and rode behind them.

After a five-day ride through snow Jefferson arrived home at Monticello on March 15.

While working for Jefferson over the years Bacon saved numerous letters and other documents in Jefferson's own handwriting, giving him directions how to manage the farm, grounds, garden, livestock of different kinds, and all the various matters connected with daily activity at Monticello. He also wrote many memoirs regarding these things, which he also saved. Historians have used Bacon's memoirs, records and letters to discern the daily activities at Monticello, as well as Jefferson's personal life and character. They show that Jefferson began to lose interest in farming after he returned from his ambassadorship to France, and that when he retired in 1794, his agricultural pursuits almost ceased completely. During this period, Bacon's memoirs record Jefferson's attention to semi-industrial activities, like the production in his nailry, building a new threshing machine, constructing a flour mill and digging a canal at the Rivanna River.

=== Relationship with slaves ===
Bacon's memoirs of his employment at Monticello produced many insights into Jefferson's relationship and treatment of his slaves. One of the most definitive examples occurred in 1807, when Bacon discovered a large quantity of nails missing when he went to fill a customer's order. All sizes of nails were in full quantity in the stock bins except one, which was completely empty. Bacon assumed one of the slaves who worked there, a James Hubbard, had stolen them, and discovered the lot of nails buried in a box in the woods not far from the nailry, as Bacon discussed:

From circumstances, I knew that Jim had stolen them. Mr. Jefferson was at home at the time,
and when I went up to Monticello I told him of it. He was very much surprised, and felt very badly
about it. Jim had always been a favorite servant. He told me to be at my house next morning when he
took his ride, and he would see Jim there. When he came, I sent for Jim, and I never saw any person,
white or black, feel as badly as he did when he saw his master. He was mortified and distressed
beyond measure. He had been brought up in the shop, and we all had confidence in him. Now his
character was gone. The tears streamed down his face, and he begged pardon over and over again.
I felt very badly myself. Mr. Jefferson turned to me, and said, 'Ah, sir, we can't punish him. He has
suffered enough already.

Bacon's memoirs and eye witness testimony to Reverend Pierson regarding Sally Hemings (Note: Jefferson's house slave and nanny to his children) by many accounts cast considerable doubt on the theory that all of her children were fathered by Thomas Jefferson. In all the years Bacon worked there, he never saw the two of them together in any capacity that would suggest a sexual liaison, and on several occasions witnessed another man leaving Sally's room early in the morning. In an interview Bacon maintains:

He freed one girl some years before he died, and there was a great deal of talk about it. She was nearly
as white as anybody, and very beautiful. People said he freed her because she was his own daughter.
She was not his daughter; she was ___’s daughter. (Note: The name of the man mentioned by Bacon was omitted by Rev. Pierson presumably to protect any living descendants at the time.) I know that. I have seen him come out of her
mother’s room many a morning, when I went up to Monticello very early.

=== University of Virginia ===
Bacon assisted Jefferson in the first stages of planning and building the University of Virginia. Jefferson initially sent Bacon to examine the three different proposed sites and to obtain the asking prices of each in writing, seal them up in an envelope and return them to him promptly. The property selected was "a poor old turned out field, though it was finely situated", a 40-acre plot in Charlottesville that once belonged to James Monroe who had sold it just before assuming the Presidency, now owned by John M. Perry who sold the plot at $12 per acre. Jefferson then told Bacon to get ten able bodied hands. Once the workman were selected, Bacon and Jefferson walked about and examined the grounds, after which Jefferson drove the first stake into the ground, and both began to plot off the perimeter of the soon to be University building using a large ball of twine.

=== After Monticello ===
When Bacon retired from his service at Monticello, he moved to Kentucky, as did many Virginians during the 1820s. In 1823 he purchased a farm in Trigg County with his savings. In later years, Bacon lent Jefferson money when he (Jefferson) was trying to manage his debts. He also loaned money to James Monroe.

Later, during the 1860s, Reverend Hamilton W. Pierson, then president of Cumberland College in Princeton, Kentucky, learned of Bacon's presence nearby. Bacon was then seventy five years old, so Pierson made several visits to Bacon's home and recorded his oral history, as well as reviewed the enormous collection of records and letters Bacon had saved over the years while working as an overseer and business manager for Jefferson at Monticello. Rev. Pierson used "a large mass of letters and other documents" in Jefferson's own handwriting, outlining instructions for his management of the various affairs at Monticello, as well as Bacon's remembrances and records in his book Jefferson at Monticello. The Private Life of Thomas Jefferson, although he noted that Bacon did not have many other artifacts. (Note: Complete title: Jefferson at Monticello. The Private Life of Thomas Jefferson. from entirely new Materials with numerous fac-similes)

Edmund Bacon died in 1866 at the age of 81 and is buried in Trigg county.

== See also ==
- Bibliography of Thomas Jefferson
- Slaves at Monticello

== Bibliography ==
- Bear, James Adam (1967). Jefferson at Monticello.
  University of Virginia Press 144 pages. ISBN 978-0-8139-0022-3. Book1 Book2
- Ellis, Joseph J. (1998). American Sphinx.
  Random House Digital, Inc. 464 pages. ISBN 978-0-375-72746-7., Book
- Gordon-Reed, Annette (2009). The Hemingses of Monticello: An American Family.
  W. W. Norton & Company 816 pages. ISBN 9780393070033., Book
- Hayes, Kevin J. (2008). The Road to Monticello: The Life and Mind of Thomas Jefferson.
  Oxford University Press. ISBN 978-0-19-530758-0., Book
- —— (2012). Jefferson in His Own Time: A Biographical Chronicle of His Life, Drawn from Recollections, Interviews, and Memoirs by Family, Friends, and Associates.
  University of Iowa Press. p. 210. ISBN 978-1-60938-120-2. Book
- Hyland, William G. (2009). In Defense of Thomas Jefferson: The Sally Hemings Sex Scandal.
  Thomas Dunne Books, 320 pages. ISBN 978-0312561000. Book
- Malone, Dumas (1974). Jefferson the President: Second Term, 1805-1809. Little, Brown, 704 pages., Book
- Mclaughlin, Jack (2011). Jefferson and Monticello: The Biography of a Builder. Henry Holt & Co., New York.
- Pierson, Rev. Hamilton W., D. D. (1862). JEFFERSON AT MONTICELLO. THE PRIVATE LIFE OF THOMAS JEFFERSON. from entirely new Materials with numerous fac-similies.
  Charles Scribner, New York; (Original from the University of Michigan). p. 138., E'book (full view E'book1, E'book2)
- Wiencek, Henry (2012). Master of the Mountain: Thomas Jefferson and His Slaves.
  Macmillan. pp. 352. ISBN 978-0-374-29956-9. Book

=== Primary sources ===
- Jefferson, Thomas Morris; Betts, Edwin Morris (1999).
  Thomas Jefferson's Garden Book, 1766-1824: With Relevant Extracts from His Other Writings.
  UNC Press Books. p. 766. ISBN 978-1-882886-11-1., Book

=== Further reading ===
- Onuf, Peter S. (1993). Jeffersonian Legacies. University of Virginia Press, 478 pages. ISBN 9780813914633., Book

=== External links ===
- Other Books
