= Martin Hemings =

- Born: c. 1755; Virginia Colony, Thirteen Colonies
- Died: after 1795
- Occupations: butler, slave
- Parent: Elizabeth Hemings
- Relatives: See Hemings family

Martin Hemings was an American man enslaved to Thomas Jefferson. He worked as Jefferson's butler at Monticello.

== Family history and early life ==
Martin Hemings was born on a plantation called "The Forest" that belonged to John Wayles. He was the oldest male child of Elizabeth Hemings. The historical record does not name his father, but it was not John Wayles, making him the half-brother of Sally Hemings and James Hemings.

When Martha Wayles Skelton married Thomas Jefferson, Hemings and many people in his family went with Skelton to Jefferson's house at Monticello. Martin Hemings was 17 or 18 years old. He later became the butler of Monticello and lived there for many years. When Thomas Jefferson became governor of Virginia and lived in houses in Richmond, Virginia and Williamsburg, Virginia, Martin Hemings went with him.

Hemings' duties at Monticello may have included handling money and making purchases for the household. On one occasion, he was sent to retrieve an escaped slave.

== Personality ==
Thomas Jefferson said in his letters that Martin had a fiery temper. Jefferson's granddaughters said he had a gloomy temper and became angry if anyone but Jefferson gave him orders.

During the American Revolutionary War, the British army captured Monticello. Hemings hid the valuable silver tableware under the floorboards. Another enslaved man, Caesar, hid with them and was unable to leave for three days. Martin did not tell the British soldiers, where the silver was, even though they beat him.

Jefferson's granddaughters told historian Henry S. Randall the family story: A British officer pointed a gun at Martin Hemings and told Hemings to say which way Jefferson had gone. "Fire away, then," answered Hemings. White historians during and shortly after the war took Martin Hemings' motivation to be loyalty to his master and his country. Twenty-first-century historian Annette Gordon-Reed writes that perhaps Hemings just did not like being told what to do.

== Later life ==
Jefferson was away from Monticello frequently, especially after the death of his wife. He lived in Paris for several years when he was the United States Ambassador to France. Whenever Jefferson was away from Monticello, the enslaved people in the Hemings family were allowed to come and go as they saw fit. The Hemings men lived almost like free men: they were able to find jobs where they wanted and keep all the money earned.

When Jefferson returned from Paris, he wanted his butler, Martin Hemings, to stay at Monticello. But Hemings had been used to living his own life. He "ran away" from Monticello many times. Sometimes he stayed away for months, working another job somewhere else, always being captured and returned eventually.

In 1792, Jefferson wrote that he and Hemings had a disagreement or fight, but did not mention what it was about. He told one of his managers at Monticello that he and Hemings had agreed that Jefferson would sell Hemings to someone else. Hemings was 36 or 37 at the time. Jefferson told the manager that Hemings could choose the buyer. He said he did not care how much money he got for Hemings, so long as Hemings was gone. He also told the manager that he did not want to free Hemings, the way he would later free his half-brothers Robert and James later in their lives.

"Martin and myself disagreed when I was last in Virginia insomuch that he desired me to sell him, and I determined to do it, and most irrevocably that he shall serve me no longer. If you could find a master agreeable to him, I should be glad if you would settle that point at any price you please .... Perhaps Martin may undertake to find a purchaser. But I exclude all idea of his own responsibility: and I would wish that the transaction should be finished without delay, being desirous of avoiding all parley with him myself on the subject."

Thomas Jefferson's letters and writings never mention any sale, but do state that Hemings was still at Monticello in 1795. Annette Gordon-Reed speculates in her book The Hemingses of Monticello that Hemings may have died of natural causes before Jefferson and Hemings could find a buyer.

== See also ==
- Sally Hemings
- Monticello
