= Jefferson in Paris =

- Original poster
- Directed by: James Ivory
- Written by: Ruth Prawer Jhabvala
- Produced by: Ismail Merchant; Humbert Balsan; Paul Bradley; Donald Rosenfeld
- Starring: Nick Nolte; Greta Scacchi; Jean-Pierre Aumont; Simon Callow; Seth Gilliam; James Earl Jones; Michael Lonsdale; Nancy Marchand; Thandiwe Newton; Gwyneth Paltrow; Charlotte de Turckheim; Lambert Wilson
- Cinematography: Pierre Lhomme
- Music by: Richard Robbins
- Production companies: Touchstone Pictures; Merchant Ivory Productions
- Distributed by: Gaumont Buena Vista International (France); Buena Vista Pictures Distribution (Select territories)
- Release dates: March 31, 1995 (United States); May 17, 1995 (France)
- Running time: 139 minutes
- Countries: France; United States
- Languages: English; French
- Budget: $14 million
- Box office: $5.9 million

Jefferson in Paris is a 1995 historical drama film, directed by James Ivory, and previously entitled Head and Heart. The screenplay, by Ruth Prawer Jhabvala, is a semi-fictional account of Thomas Jefferson's tenure as the Ambassador of the United States to France before his presidency and of his relationships with Italian-English artist Maria Cosway and his slave, Sally Hemings.

The film was critically and commercially unsuccessful, grossing $5.9 million on a $14 million budget.

== Plot ==
Set in the period 1784–1789, the film portrays Jefferson when he was US minister to France at Versailles before the French Revolution. French liberals and intellectuals hope he will lead them away from the corruption of the court of King Louis XVI and Queen Marie Antoinette and toward a more democratic form of government. Although deploring the poverty of the common people, he embraces the riches of French culture and civilization. It is his first time abroad, and he takes advantage of the opportunity to extend his knowledge of liberal arts and science while absorbing the refinements France has to offer.

A lonely widower, Jefferson develops a close friendship with Maria Cosway, a beautiful (and married) Anglo-Italian painter and musician. Although she becomes increasingly devoted to him, he is attached to his memory of his late wife, to whom he promised that he would not remarry, and to his two younger daughters. Patsy, his eldest daughter, is especially possessive and becomes jealous of Maria's influence on her father. Maria becomes his confidant and correspondent, and their relationship soon becomes romantic, though it is complicated by Maria's marriage and Thomas's vow to his late wife never to remarry.

Later, Jefferson becomes attracted to Sally Hemings, his enslaved maid and companion of his younger daughter Polly. Three-quarters white in ancestry, she is his late wife's half-sister. Their father had taken Sally's slave mother as a concubine after he was widowed for the third time; Sally is the sixth of their children. Sally's enslaved brother James Hemings is also in Paris, training to be a French chef for Jefferson at Monticello. It is strongly implied that Jefferson begins a sexual relationship with Sally, which Patsy is aware of and disgusted by. She implies the truth to Maria, who witnesses the familiarity between Jefferson and Sally first-hand and, already having felt neglected by Jefferson, swiftly ends her relationship with him.

When George Washington offers Jefferson the post of Secretary of State, he accepts and prepares to sail home with his family. Sally reveals to James that she is pregnant by Jefferson, but James, having enjoyed his freedom in Paris, is unwilling to return to the United States and urges Sally to remain with him for the sake of her child. It is only when Jefferson promises, making an oath upon the Bible, that he will give James and Sally their freedom that they consent to return with him. Jefferson extends his oath to promise freedom to all of Sally's children as well upon his death, with Patsy bearing witness and swearing to carry out his promise.

== Cast ==
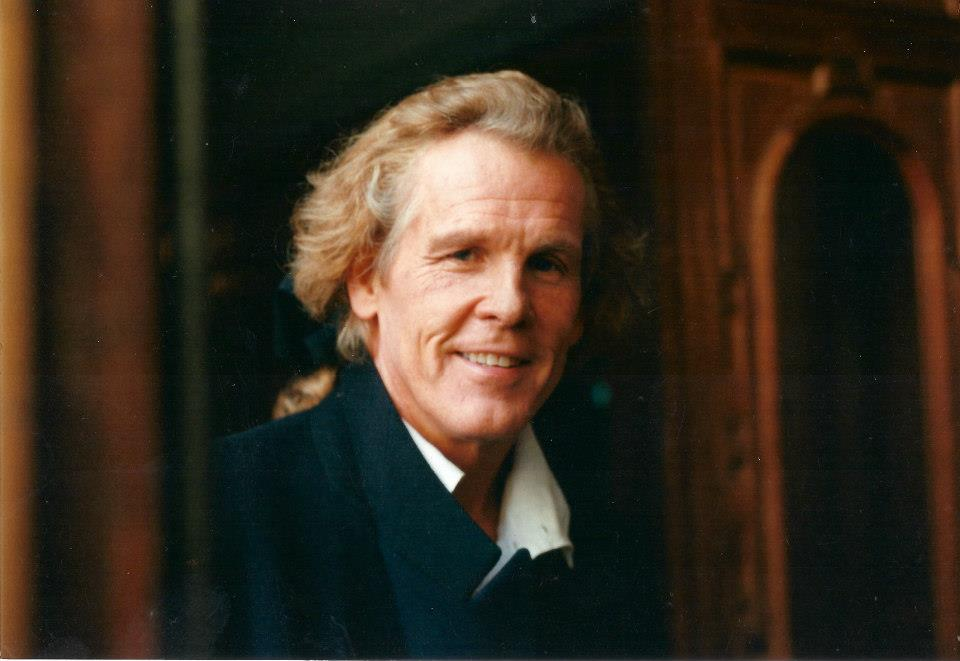
Nick Nolte as Thomas Jefferson.

=== At Jefferson's house, the Hôtel de Langeac ===
- Nick Nolte as Thomas Jefferson
- Gwyneth Paltrow as Patsy Jefferson
- Estelle Eonnet as Polly Jefferson
- Thandiwe Newton as Sally Hemings (credited as Thandie Newton)
- Seth Gilliam as James Hemings
- Todd Boyce as William Short
- Nigel Whitmey as John Trumbull
- Nicolas Silberg as Monsieur Petit
- Catherine Samie as Cook
- Lionel Robert as Cook's Helper

=== At Lafayette's ===
- Greta Scacchi as Maria Cosway
- Simon Callow as Richard Cosway
- Lambert Wilson as Marquis de Lafayette
- Elsa Zylberstein as Adrienne de Lafayette
- William Moseley as Georges Washington de Lafayette
- Jean-Pierre Aumont as d'Hancarville
- Anthony Valentine as British Ambassador

=== At Versailles ===
- Michael Lonsdale as Louis XVI
- Charlotte de Turckheim as Marie-Antoinette
- Damien Groëlle as The Dauphin
- Louise Balsan as Madame Royale
- Valérie Toledano as Madame Elizabeth
- Vernon Dobtcheff as King's Translator

=== At the Panthémont Abbey ===
- Nancy Marchand as Madame Abbesse
- Jessica Lloyd as Julia

=== At Doctor Mesmer's ===
- Daniel Mesguich as Mesmer
- Thibault de Montalembert as Assistant

=== At the Opera ===
- William Christie as Conductor
- Jean-Paul Fouchécourt as Dardanus
- Ismail Merchant as Tipoo Sultin's Ambassador

=== At the Palais Royal ===
- Vincent Cassel as Camille Desmoulins
- Martine Chevallier as Mademoiselle Contat

=== Pike County, Ohio ===
- James Earl Jones as Madison Hemings
- Beatrice Winde as Mary Hemings
- Tim Choate as Reporter

== Production ==
The film was shot on location in Paris, at the Desert de Retz and the Palace of Versailles. The scenes at the Desert reenact the actual visit made by Jefferson and Cosway in September 1787. Many of French supporting cast are members of Comédie-Française. It premiered at the 1995 Cannes Film Festival.

Antonio Sacchini's 1784 opera Dardanus appears in the film. Also Marc-Antoine Charpentier' "Leçons de ténèbres", performed by William Christie and Les Arts Florissants with Jean-Paul Fouchécourt, Sandrine Piau, Sophie Daneman, and Jory Vinikour. Arcangelo Corelli's La Folia is performed by Nolte, Scacchi, and Paltrow, but the soundtrack CD is re-dubbed by others. Although Gwyneth Paltrow studied harpsichord for the film, her playing is dubbed by Jory Vinikour, including pieces by Jacques Duphly and Claude Balbastre. Scacchi's performance of Maria Cosway's song, "Mormora", was dubbed.

The film was budgeted at $14 million.

== Release ==
The film opened on two screens in New York and Los Angeles on March 31, 1995.

== Reception ==
=== Critical reception ===
As of February 2018, Jefferson in Paris holds a rating of 31% on Rotten Tomatoes based on 16 reviews.

In her positive review in The New York Times, Janet Maslin called the film:

an extraordinary spectacle ... the rare contemporary film that's both an entertainment and an education, despite some glaring misimpressions that are sure to spark heated debate ... The biggest problem with [the film] is at the basic editing level, with such abrupt jumps between diverse scenes that the film's momentum remains choppy. Overshadowed by its own ambition and not-quite-ironic pageantry, Jefferson in Paris doesn't quite come to life ... Casting Nick Nolte as a Founding Father may sound like this film's riskiest choice, but in fact it makes solid sense. Beyond having the right physical stature for the imposing, sandy-haired Jefferson, Mr. Nolte captures the man's vigor and his stiff sense of propriety. He may not adapt effortlessly to the role of an intellectual giant, but his performance is thoroughly creditable ... The film makers fare less successfully with Maria Cosway ... Ms. Scacchi, the film's big casting problem, makes her so bloodless and prettily artificial that the romance never seems real. There's much more spice in Ms. Newton's captivating performance as Sally Hemings, even if she gives this teen-age slave girl the unexpected fiddle-dee-dee flirtatiousness of a Scarlett O'Hara.

Roger Ebert of the Chicago Sun-Times observed in a less positive review of the film that:

The film is lavishly produced and visually splendid, like all the Merchant-Ivory productions. But what is it about? Revolution? History? Slavery? Romance? No doubt a lot of research and speculation went into Jhabvala's screenplay, but I wish she had finally decided to jump one way or the other. The movie tells no clear story and has no clear ideas.

In a negative review appearing in Rolling Stone magazine, Peter Travers said:

After a literate and entertaining roll (A Room With a View, Howards End, The Remains of the Day), the team of producer Ismail Merchant, director James Ivory and writer Ruth Prawer Jhabvala drops the ball with this droopy, snail-paced prigs-in-wigs movie. It doesn't help that Nick Nolte is such a lox as Thomas Jefferson ... [He] seems to think that playing an introspective man means impersonating a wax dummy.

Edward Guthmann of the San Francisco Chronicle called the film "dull, sluggish and unfocused ... [it] tries telling three or four stories at once, can't decide which is most important and winds up stubbing its well-manicured toes" and added:

Coiffed in a strawberry blond ponytail that makes him look like sitcom star Brett Butler, and surrounded by opulent sets and costumes that look like early bids for Oscar nominations, Nolte makes a noble, sympathetic effort to humanize a historical figure, but never manages to look anything other than tight, corseted and out of his element.

In Variety, Todd McCarthy said the film:

touches upon much significant history, incident and emotion but, ironically, lacks the intrigue and drama of great fiction ... as the opportunity for drama increases with the onset of Jefferson's affair with Sally and the buildup toward the Revolution, the narrative becomes more dispersed and murky. Things happen ... but they don't weave and dovetail in the surprising, intricate and telling ways they can in first-class fiction, some of Merchant Ivory's recent films included ... The strong points of director James Ivory's approach here are his attentiveness to wonderful detail ... The downside is that Ivory's reticence makes it additionally tough for an emotionally remote figure like Jefferson to come alive onscreen.

=== Box office ===
The film grossed $61,349 in its opening weekend from just two screens. It went on to gross $2,473,668 in the US and Canada. It grossed $3.4 million internationally for a worldwide total of $5.9 million.

== Historical basis ==
This was the first portrayal in film of Sally Hemings, and at the time most Jefferson scholars disputed the rumors, started in 1802 by a vengeful journalist named James Callender, that Jefferson had fathered a child by her. Since then, a 1998 Nature study found a match between the male lines of a Jefferson and one descendant of Hemings. In 2000, the Thomas Jefferson Memorial Foundation issued its own report on the DNA test results in light of other historical evidence and said that it was "highly probable" that Thomas Jefferson was the father of Eston Hemings, the youngest child of Sally, and "most likely" that he was the father of all six, four of whom lived to adulthood. This claim is still disputed by some.

== See also ==
- List of films featuring slavery
