= Hemings family =

Family of enslaved Black people in Virginia

The Hemings family lived in Virginia in the 1700s and 1800s. The family consisted of Elizabeth "Betty" Hemings and her children and other descendants. They were slaves with at least one ancestor who had lived in Africa and been brought over the Atlantic Ocean in the Trans-Atlantic slave trade. Some of them became free later in their lives. For part of their history, they were owned by the Eppes family, to the Wayles family, and to Thomas Jefferson. The Hemingses were the largest family to live at Jefferson's house, Monticello.

== Origins ==
When he was interviewed, Madison Hemings told a historian that his grandmother Elizabeth's mother had been a fully African woman but he did not know whether she was born in Africa. She was owned by the Eppes family. Historians do not know for sure what her name was. Papers with the names of female slaves in the Eppes family list "Dinah," "Judy," "Abbie," "Sarah," "Parthenia," and others. Historian Annette Gordon-Reed said that there were many girls named "Thenia" in the Hemings family, and they might have been named after Parthenia, also spelled Parthena. But she also says that "Sally" is a nickname for "Sarah," and there were many girls named "Sarah" and "Sally" in the Hemings family too.

According to Madison Hemings, Elizabeth Hemings' mother was an African woman and her father was an English sea captain named Hemings. The sea captain tried to buy Elizabeth Hemings from her owner when she was born. Even though he offered the owner a large sum, the owner refused to sell Elizabeth. He said he wanted to see what a half-white, half-African child would look like. Captain Hemings later tried to break into the Eppes' house and take his daughter away "by force or stealth," but someone told the owner about his plan. Captain Hemings left Virginia and disappeared from Hemings family lore.

The man with whom Captain Hemings negotiated for his daughter was a male member of the Eppes family, but historians do not know which one because they do not know when Elizabeth Hemings was born. Records kept by Thomas Jefferson indicate a date of "about 1735." It could have been either of two men, depending on which was still living at the time.

Elizabeth Hemings lived at the Eppes family's house, which was called Bermuda Hundred, until 1746. That year, Martha Eppes married John Wayles. Elizabeth and other enslaved people went with Martha to Wayles's house as part of her marriage settlement. Technically, the Eppes family owned Elizabeth Hemings even when she worked for the Wayles.

Elizabeth Hemings lived as a house servant. Historians think that Elizabeth Hemings' job with the Wayles family was to help raise Martha Wayles, who would later marry Thomas Jefferson. After John Wayles' wife died, he made Elizabeth Hemings his concubine, meaning that they had a sexual relationship but he did not marry her or free her or her children.

When Martha Wayles, at the time called Martha Skelton, married Thomas Jefferson, Hemings and many people in her family went with her to Jefferson's house at Monticello. Historians think Elizabeth Hemings took care of Martha Jefferson when she became sick and that she was present at her death.

== Habits ==
The Hemingses were known for pooling resources. They also had what historian Annette Gordon-Reed calls a "mania" for naming their children after each other.

Many of Thomas Jefferson's letters and other writings survive, so historians know more about the Hemingses who lived on Monticello than about many other slave families. Six of Elizabeth Hemings' children were Martha Jefferson's half-brothers and half-sisters because they had the same father: John Wayles. Robert and James Hemings helped Martha Jefferson and her daughters escape from British soldiers during the American Revolutionary War. Historians do not know whether the Hemings men thought of themselves as two men helping their sister and nieces, as two men helping their master's wife and daughters, as both, or as neither one.

Thomas Jefferson trusted many people in the Hemings family. When he was away from Monticello, he would allow the Hemings men to leave, choose other people for whom to work, and keep all their wages, something which was not required by Virginia state law. Normally, slave owners kept some or all of the money that a slave earned while working for someone else. Jefferson freed several people in the Hemings family but not all of them. Jefferson's writings mention that he had a conflict with Martin Hemings so intense that he decided to sell him, but did not actually do so before Hemings' death.

Jefferson was not always happy to free his slaves. When Robert Hemings asked to buy his freedom, Jefferson said that Robert must have been lured away from him. After freeing Robert, Jefferson stopped letting his slaves travel so much. Historian Annette Gordon-Reed writes that she thinks Jefferson figured out that letting slaves live as if they were free made them want to be legally free. It also let them learn things about the outside world.

== Family tree ==
Elizabeth Hemings' children with an unknown partner:

- Mary Hemings Bell (1753-after 1834)

Mary Hemings' children with earlier partners:
- Daniel Farley (1772-1837)
- Molly (1777-after 1790)
- Joseph Fossett (1780-1858)
- Betsy Hemings (1783-1857)
Mary Hemings' children with Thomas Bell:
- Robert Washington Bell (c. 1785-after 1840)
- Sarah Jefferson Bell (d. 1834)

- Martin Hemings (1755-after 1795)
- Betty Brown (1759-post 1831)

- Billy (1777-1778)
- Wormley Hughes (1781-1858)
- Burwell Colbert (1783-1862)
- Brown Colbert (1785-1833)
- Melinda Colbert (1787-1860)
- Edwin (1793-after 1819)
- Robert (1799-after 1820)
- Mary Colbert (1801-1843)

- Nancy Hemings (1761-after 1827)

- Billy (1780-after 1795)
- Critta Hemings (1783-1819)

Elizabeth Hemings' children with John Wayles:

- Robert Hemings (1762-1819)

Robert Hemings' children with his wife:
- Martin Hemings
- Elizabeth Hemings

- James Hemings (1765-1801)
- Thenia Hemings (1767-1795)

- Mary
- Lucy
- Betsy
- Susan
- Sally
- an unnamed child (1795-after 1796)

- Critta Hemings (1769-1850)

- James Hemings (1787-after 1815)

- Peter Hemings (1770-after 1834)

- Eugenia Hemings (1803-1885)
- James Hemings (1804-1870)
- Anderson Hemings (1808-1868)
- Betty Hemings

- Sally Hemings (1773-1835)

Sally Hemings' children with Thomas Jefferson:
- an unnamed baby
- Harriet (1795-1797)
- Beverley Hemings (1798- after 1822)
- a daughter (1799-1800)
- Harriet Hemings (1801- after 1822)
- Madison Hemings (1805-1877)
- Eston Hemings Jefferson (1808-1856)

Elizabeth Hemings' children with Joseph Neilson, known:

- John Hemings (1776-1833)

Elizabeth Hemings' children with Joseph Neilson, possible:

- Lucy Hemings (1777-1786)
