= John Wayles Jefferson =

Union Army colonel

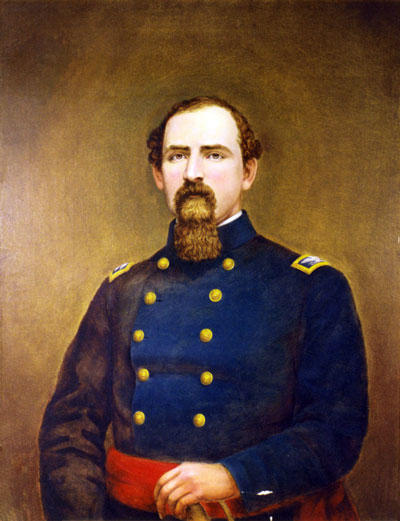
- Born: John Wayles Hemings; May 8, 1835; Charlottesville, Virginia, U.S.
- Died: June 12, 1892 (aged 57); Memphis, Tennessee, U.S.
- Resting place: Forest Hill Cemetery, Madison, Wisconsin
- Occupations: Hotelier, cotton broker, journalist
- Parents: Eston Hemings (father); Julia Ann Isaacs (mother)
- Relatives: Sally Hemings (grandmother)
- Military career
- Allegiance: United States
- Branch: U.S. Army (Union Army)
- Service years: 1861–1864
- Rank: Colonel (USV)
- Commands: 8th Reg. Wis. Vol. Infantry
- Conflicts: American Civil War

John Wayles Jefferson (born John Wayles Hemings; May 8, 1835 – June 12, 1892), was an American businessman and Union Army officer in the American Civil War. He was the grandson of Thomas Jefferson; his paternal grandmother was Sarah (Sally) Hemings, Thomas Jefferson's mixed-race slave and frequently theorized half-sister to his wife.

== Early life and family ==
John's father, Eston Hemings, was born enslaved at Monticello in 1808, the youngest of Sally Hemings' six mixed-race children. They were very likely the children of President Thomas Jefferson, Hemings' enslaver. As they were seven-eighths European in ancestry (7 of his 8 great-grandparents were "white"), under Virginian law at the time any child born to someone 1/4 African and White was considered mulatto. But they were born into slavery under the slave law principle of partus sequitur ventrem, by which children of slave mothers took the status of the mother. Sally Hemings was three-quarters white and claimed by her son to be the half-sister of Jefferson's late wife, Martha Wayles Skelton.

Thomas Jefferson informally or formally freed all of Sally's four surviving children. He permitted his two oldest children to "escape" when they came of age; they went North to Washington, DC and changed their names to pass into white society, both marrying white spouses. Jefferson's will freed Madison and Eston Hemings shortly after the president's death in 1826; Eston was "given his time" so that he did not have to wait until the age of 21 for freedom. Madison, already 21, had been freed immediately. In 1830 Eston purchased property in Charlottesville, on which he and his brother Madison built a house. Their mother Sally lived with them until her death in 1835.

In Charlottesville, Eston married Julia Ann Isaacs, a mixed-race daughter of a Jewish merchant, David Isaacs from Germany, and Nancy West, a free woman of color, who built an independent bakery business in the town. John Wayles Hemings was the eldest child of Eston and Julia, born in Charlottesville in 1835. His first and middle name were after the man his father proclaimed to be his great-grandfather John Wayles. According to Eston’s account, widower Wayles had fathered six children by his enslaved concubine Betty Hemings, of whom the youngest was Sally Hemings. Eston and Julia's second child, Anna Wayles Hemings (1837–1866), was also born in Charlottesville.

After his mother Sally died, Eston and Julia Ann Hemings moved their family to Chillicothe in the free state of Ohio, where they settled for more than 15 years. His and Julia's youngest child, Beverley Frederick Hemings (1839–1908), was born there. The town had a thriving free black community and strong abolitionist activists, who together helped fugitive slaves along the Underground Railroad. Eston was well known as a musician and entertainer. The children were educated in the public schools. His brother Madison Hemings and his family also moved there.

In 1852, after passage of the Fugitive Slave Act, increased the danger to members of the African-American community as slave catchers came to Ohio, as they sometimes kidnapped free blacks to sell them into slavery, the family moved north to Madison, Wisconsin, the state capital. There, the entire family took the surname "Jefferson" to reflect Eston's and the children's ancestry. John was 17, Anna 16, and Beverly 13 at the time of the move. The family lived as part of the white community in Madison and for the rest of their lives. As adults, both Anna and Beverly Jefferson married white spouses; John never married. Anna died young in 1866 at the age of 30.

Additional samples of Thomas Jefferson's hair were identified in the 21st century and were used to create a Jefferson DNA profile, against which those of known descendants were compared. The later DNA testing conclusively proved that Jefferson fathered Sally Hemings' sons, Madison Hemings and Eston.

== Career ==
Before the Civil War, John W. Jefferson operated the American House hotel in Madison, Wisconsin, where he brought on his younger brother Beverly to help and learn the business.

=== Military service ===
At the age of 26, Jefferson entered the volunteer Union Army on August 26, 1861, at Madison, Wisconsin. He served in the 8th Wisconsin Infantry Regiment during the American Civil War. On September 28, 1861, he was promoted to major; to lieutenant colonel on April 23, 1863; and to colonel on June 16, 1864. He fought in significant battles of the war and was wounded at Vicksburg and during the Siege of Corinth. He was mustered out of service on October 11, 1864, at Madison, Wisconsin. His brother, William Beverly Jefferson, also served as a white soldier in the Union Army.

According to service records, John Jefferson had red hair and gray eyes (as did Thomas Jefferson). Photographs show his strong resemblance to Thomas Jefferson.

In 1902, a former neighbor from Chillicothe recalled John Jefferson's concerns about his mixed ancestry in the social climate of the times:

... and I saw and talked with one of the sons, during the Civil War, who was then wearing the silver leaves of a lieutenant colonel, and in command of a fine regiment of white men from a north-western state. He begged me not to tell the fact that he had colored blood in his veins, which he said was not suspected by any of his command; and of course I did not.

=== Post-war career ===
Jefferson wrote as a newspaper correspondent during and after the war, publishing articles about his experiences. After the war, he moved to Memphis, Tennessee, where he became a highly successful cotton broker, founding the Continental Cotton Company.

He raised cotton in Arkansas and bred blooded trotting horses on his plantation near Memphis. Articles under his name in the Memphis Daily Avalanche cover such matters as improving streets, enlarging the city's boundaries, and preventing cotton-warehouse fires.

Jefferson never married. He died on June 12, 1892. He was interred in Madison, Wisconsin, in the Jefferson family plot at Forest Hill Cemetery. He left a sizeable estate.

== Ancestry controversy ==
Until the 1990s, historians disputed whether Thomas Jefferson had children with the enslaved woman Sally Hemings. Fawn McKay Brodie and Annette Gordon-Reed presented new analyses that assessed the historiography, showing evidence that other historians had overlooked.

Y-DNA tests conducted in 1998 confirmed that a male-line descendant of John's brother Beverly had a male ancestor in common with male-line descendants of the Jefferson line. (As Thomas Jefferson had no acknowledged male descendants, another from his line had to be tested, but Y-DNA was passed unchanged.) This supported the Hemings family's tradition of descent from Thomas Jefferson. As the Carr DNA did not match, the Jefferson family tradition (stated by two grandchildren) that his Carr nephew(s) had fathered Sally Hemings' children was disproved. For most historians, this data, together with the weight of historical evidence, confirmed the Hemings family's claim of descent from Thomas Jefferson.

Military offices
Preceded by Col. George W. Robbins	Command of the 8th Wisconsin Infantry Regiment; June 16, 1864 – October 11, 1864	Succeeded by Col. William B. Britton
