= John Hemming =

John Hemming may refer to:

- John Hemming (historian) (born 1935), British explorer and author
- John Hemming (politician) (born 1960), British politician

== See also ==
- John Heminges, co-publisher of Shakespeare's works after his death
- John Hemings, a slave of Thomas Jefferson
