= James Hemings =

Enslaved American and chef

- Born: c. 1765; Charles City County, Virginia
- Died: 1801 (aged 35–36); Baltimore, Maryland
- Occupations: Chef de cuisine; cook
- Years active: 1784−1801
- Parent(s): Betty Hemings; John Wayles
- Relatives: Hemings family

James Hemings (c. 1765–1801) was the first African American to train as a chef in France. Black in ancestry, he was born into slavery in Virginia in 1765. At eight years old, he was purchased by Thomas Jefferson at his residence of Monticello.

He was an older brother of Sally Hemings and a half-sibling of Jefferson's wife Martha Jefferson. Martha, Sally, and James shared John Wayles as a father. It was said that Wayles had taken James's mother Betty Hemings, who was his helper, as his concubine. As a young man, Hemings was selected by Jefferson to accompany him to Paris when the latter was appointed Minister to France. There, Hemings was trained to be a French chef; independently, he took lessons to learn how to speak French. Hemings is credited with bringing many French cooking styles to the colonial United States and developing new recipes inspired by French cuisine. This includes crème brûlée and meringues, but most famously, Hemings is credited with introducing macaroni and cheese to the United States.

Hemings returned to the United States with Jefferson, likely because of kinship ties with his large Hemings family at Monticello. Jefferson continued to pay Hemings wages as his chef when he worked for Jefferson in Philadelphia. Hemings negotiated with Jefferson for his freedom, which he gained in 1796 after training his brother Peter for three years to replace him as a chef. Said to suffer from alcoholism, Hemings died by suicide at age 36.

== Early life ==
James Hemings was born into slavery to Betty Hemings, who was the mixed-race daughter of an enslaved African mother and an English sea captain father whose surname was Hemings. James was the second of her six children by her enslaver John Wayles, who took Betty as a concubine after he was widowed for the third time. Her concubinage lasted for 12 years, until his death, and he had six children with her. They were three-quarters European by ancestry. Betty had four older children by another man. Wayles died in 1773, leaving Betty and the ten children to his daughter Martha Jefferson, who was half-sister to his children by Betty. Martha was then married to Thomas Jefferson, who became their enslaver by marriage.

In 1784, Thomas Jefferson took James Hemings with him when he went to Paris as Minister Plenipotentiary to the Court of Versailles, as he wanted the young man, then 19, trained as a chef. While they were in France, Jefferson paid Hemings a wage of four dollars per month, and though it was a steady wage, it was less than Jefferson had paid his previous chef, who was white. For the first three years, Hemings studied cooking and apprenticed to pastry chefs and other specialists, including the chef of a prince. He paid personally to learn the language from a French tutor. He earned the role of chef de cuisine in Jefferson's kitchen on the Champs-Élysées. He served his creations to the European aristocrats, writers, and scientists Jefferson invited to dinner.

== Career ==
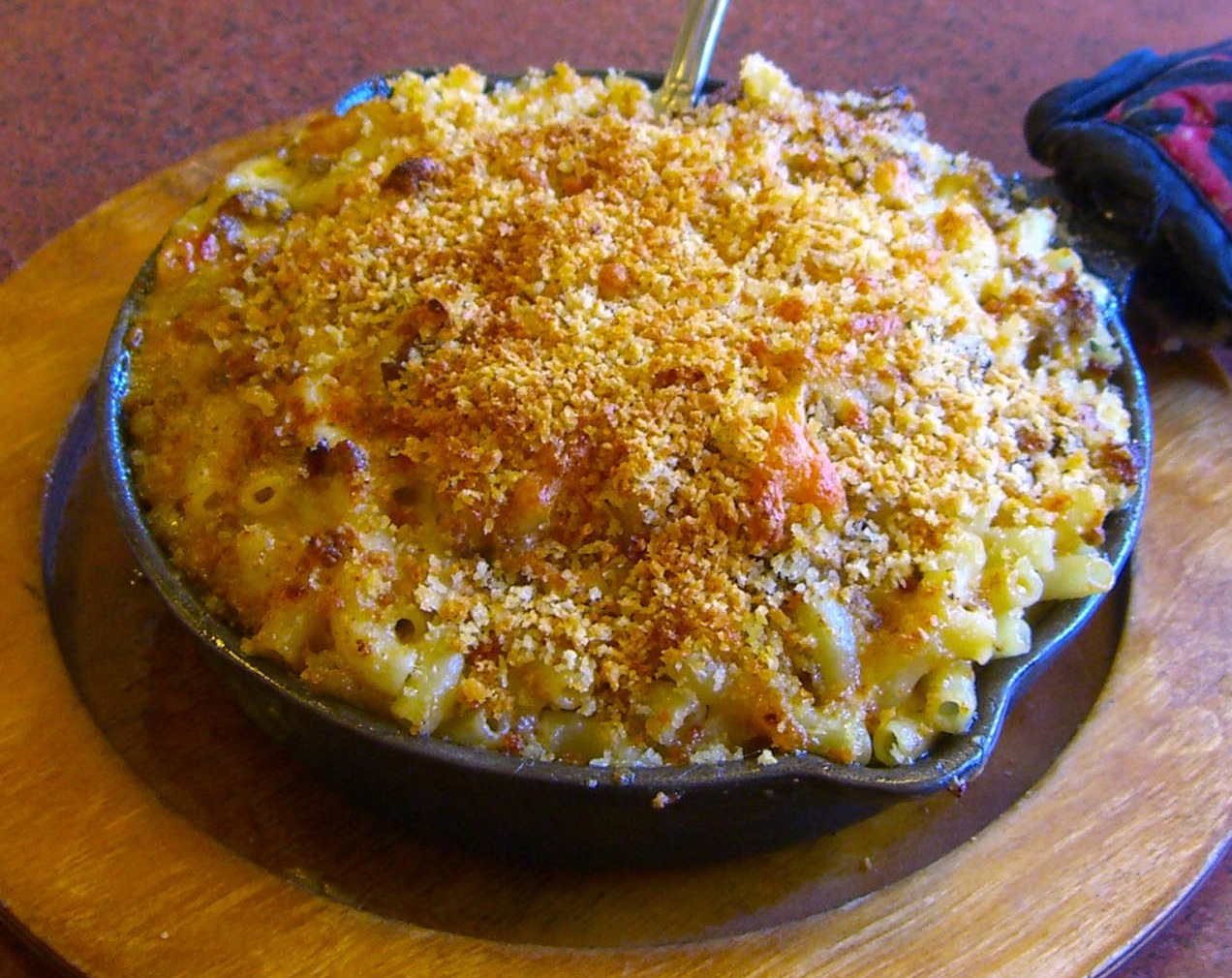
Baked macaroni and cheese

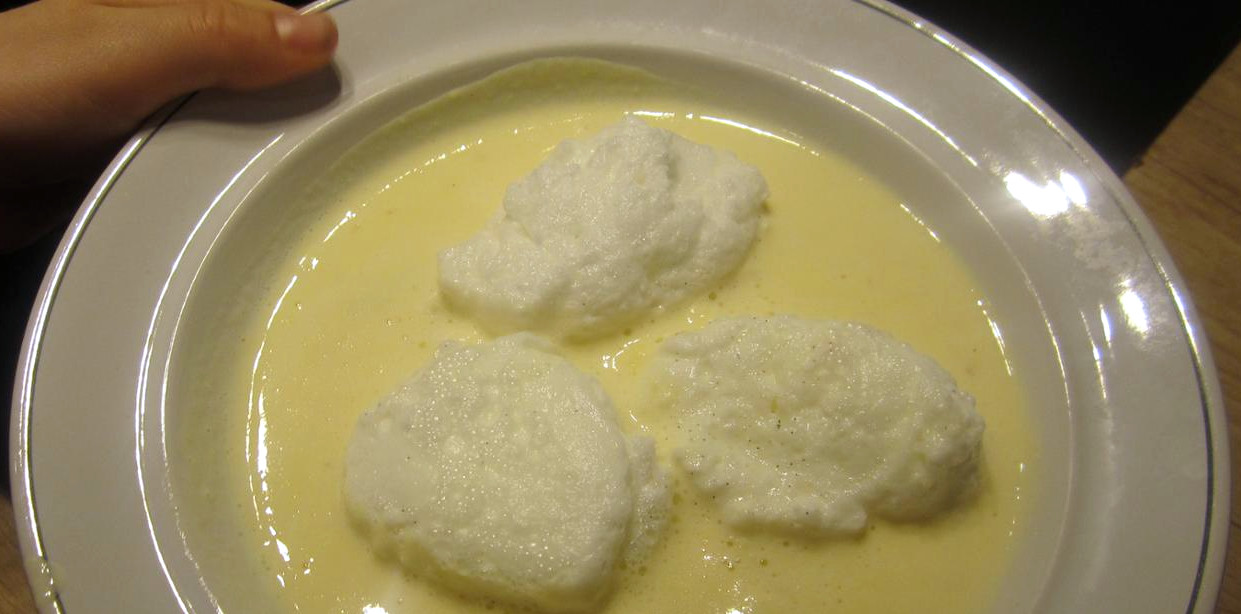
Snow Eggs, a French dessert introduced by Hemings to the United States

During his time in France, Hemings learned the dish of pasta and cheese. He prepared a dish called "macaroni pie". This dish evolved to what Americans call macaroni and cheese today. James is believed to be one of the first American chefs to prepare the dish in this way. However, credit is often incorrectly attributed to Thomas Jefferson's cousin, Mary Randolph, as it was later included in her seminal housekeeping book, The Virginia House-Wife. Another dish James introduced to American cuisine is Snow Eggs, which is originally French and consists of meringue and custard.

In Paris, Jefferson became concerned that Hemings might learn he could be free when France abolished slavery in 1789. Hemings paid for a French tutor to teach him the language using his personal wage. Though France had abolished slavery at this point, and Hemings's wages could have afforded him a lawyer, no current evidence shows Hemings attempted to pursue that option. Jefferson wrote about this issue to another American enslaver in a similar situation. According to the 1873 memoir of Madison Hemings, his uncle James and (future) mother Sally actively considered staying in France for freedom while they were in Paris. (Sally Hemings had accompanied one of Jefferson's daughters to France and worked for the family until they returned to the United States.) While fearful of their seeking freedom, Jefferson, who was in debt for most of his life, was also concerned about having paid for training James.

In 1789, however, both the Hemingses returned to the United States with Jefferson; he continued to pay James wages to work as his chef. They first returned to Monticello. They lived briefly in a leased house on Maiden Lane in New York City (when the national government was based there), where James Hemings ran the kitchen.

Hemings was also the chef for one of the early United States's most famous dinners - one that then-Secretary of State Thomas Jefferson dubbed a meal "to save the union." On June 20, 1790, at a dinner cheffed by Hemings, Alexander Hamilton and Jefferson reconciled after being well-known political enemies. Further, "Alexander Hamilton agreed to establishing Washington, D.C. as the permanent capital; in exchange, James Madison agreed to the federal government assuming the debt of the states."

In the spring of 1791, when James Hemings and Jefferson were residents in Philadelphia, then the capital, the young enslaved man accompanied Jefferson and James Madison on a month-long vacation in the Northeast. The party traveled through New York and Vermont, stopping at Albany, Lake George, Lake Champlain, and Bennington. Jefferson often entrusted Hemings to travel alone ahead of the others to arrange accommodations. After returning south through western Massachusetts and Connecticut, Jefferson and Hemings returned for a long-term stay in Philadelphia.

As Pennsylvania did not allow slavery, Jefferson paid Hemings a wage while he worked there. After two years in Philadelphia, Jefferson made plans to return to Virginia. Reluctant to return to a slave state, Hemings negotiated a contract with Jefferson by which he would gain freedom after training a replacement chef at Monticello to take his place.

In the 1793 agreement, Jefferson wrote:

Having been at great expence in having James Hemings taught the art of cookery, desiring to befriend him, and to require from him as little in return as possible, I hereby do promise & declare, that if the said James should go with me to Monticello in the course of the ensuing winter, when I go to reside there myself, and shall there continue until he shall have taught such person as I shall place under him for that purpose to be a good cook, this previous condition being performed, he shall thereupon be made free ...

Considering that Hemings had served Jefferson well for years, some historians have described this as a grudging manumission.

For two years, Hemings trained his younger brother Peter, also enslaved from birth, as the chef at Monticello and finally gained his freedom in 1796. He spoke French and English and was literate; the Library of Congress holds his handwritten inventory of kitchen supplies before he left Monticello. He also left recipes and other writings. After traveling to Europe, Hemings eventually returned to the United States, where he found work as a cook in Philadelphia.

c. 1780 portrait of a man often identified as Hemings. Recent research reveals he was most likely a Dominican in England.

Little is known about Hemings's personal life. He never married, nor did he have children. One of the difficulties in imagining his life outside of Thomas Jefferson is the scarcity of authenticated and preserved sources directly traceable to him. One of the only sources directly traceable to James is a handwritten list of kitchen utensils. According to culinary historian Michael Twitty, it is possible that Hemings had a "somewhat fluid sexuality".

In 1801, Jefferson offered Hemings a position at the White House, which Hemings declined, as he felt he could not immediately leave his position in Baltimore. When Jefferson inquired a second time, Hemings responded through an intermediary, Francis Sayes, who had worked with Hemings in New York and Philadelphia. Sayes reported, "I have spoke to James according to your Desire he has made mention again as he did before that he was willing to serve you before any other man in the Union but sence he understands that he would have to be among strange servants he would be very much obliged to you if you would send him a few lines of engagement and on what conditions and what wages you would please to give him with your own hand wreiting." Jefferson did not write Hemings, reasoning that he did not want to "urge him against inclination." Hemings later returned briefly to Monticello, working for a month and a half in the kitchen and earning thirty dollars before leaving. Later, while employed as a cook in a tavern in Baltimore, he died by suicide at age 36.

Jefferson's friend, William Evans in Baltimore, made inquiries, and on November 5, 1801, he wrote:

The report respecting James Hemings having committed an act of suicide is true. I made every inquiry at the time this melancholy circumstance took place. The result of which was, that he had been delirious for some days prior to committing the act, and it was the general opinion that drinking too freely was the cause.

On November 9, 1801, Jefferson wrote from Washington, DC, to James Dinsmore, the Irish joiner managing much of the construction at Monticello, recounting the circumstances of Hemings's death, presumably with instructions to tell his mother Betty and his brother John, who was Dinsmore's assistant. On December 4, 1801, Jefferson wrote to his son-in-law, Thomas Mann Randolph, characterizing Hemings's death as a "tragical end".
