= Burwell Colbert =

- Born: December 24, 1783
- Died: 1862 (aged 78–79)
- Occupations: Enslaved and free artisan; Butler, valet, glazier, painter
- Parent: Betty Brown
- Relatives: Elizabeth Hemings, Sally Hemings, Eston Hemings, Hemings family

Burwell Colbert (December 24, 1783 – 1862), also known as Burrell Colbert, was an enslaved African American at Monticello, the plantation estate of the third President of the United States, Thomas Jefferson. There he served an important role in the day-to-day operation and maintenance of the Jefferson estates, including Poplar Forest, as butler, personal valet, glazier, and painter. He was the son of Betty “Bett” Brown, the second child of Elizabeth “Betty” Hemings, the matriarch of the Hemings family in the United States. He was held in high esteem by President Jefferson as a "faithful servant" who was "absolutely excepted from the whip." When Jefferson died on the night of July 4, 1826, Colbert was counted among those at the bedside of the former president.

According to Edmund Bacon, chief overseer at Monticello for nearly two decades from 1806 to 1822, "Mr. Jefferson had a large number of favorite servants, that were treated just as well as could be. Burwell was the main, principal servant on the place." Jefferson was also said to have had "the most perfect confidence" in his servant Colbert. As such, he was one of two artisans at Monticello who brought particular distinction to themselves in both the operation of the estate and the life of the master of Monticello, Thomas Jefferson. He and his cousin John Hemings were exceptional in that they were given a regular annual allowance of $20 per year, and permitted to go down to the Charlottesville stores and pick out the clothing they wanted. No one else was given this privilege. This is notable because enslaved African Americans were typically given a predetermined allotment of rudimentary clothing and foodstuffs by their owner, and had no freedom of choice in the matter.

Colbert was ultimately given his freedom in Jefferson's will, and bequeathed the sum of $300 for the purchase of tools necessary to continue working in his trade. He had married his first cousin Critta Hemings with whom he became father to eight children. In 1819, Critta died at only thirty-six years of age. Fifteen years later, in 1834, Burwell married Elizabeth Battles, a free woman of color with whom he had three daughters.

In freedom, Colbert worked as a glazier and painter at the University of Virginia, of which his former master Jefferson had been the founder in 1819. Jefferson, after naming Colbert his "faithful servant", the first of only five enslaved persons freed by his will, he names the second and third "good servants" as John Hemings and Joe Fossett. John was the 11th child of Elizabeth Hemings, a son by a white laborer Joseph Neilson who had worked in the house. Burwell Colbert and Joe Fossett were two of her grandsons. Colbert's freedom was immediate while John and Joe's was to happen only one year after Jefferson's death. For only these three, Jefferson made these additional provisions:

"...it is my will that a comfortable log-house be built for each of the three servants so emancipated on some part of my lands convenient to them with respect to the residence of their wives, and to Charlottesville and the University, where they will be mostly employed, and reasonably convenient also to the interests of the proprietor of the lands; of which houses I give the use of one, with a curtilage of an acre to each, during his life or personal occupation thereof."

While freedom was a valuable gift, one Jefferson seems only to have granted to males, these three had been especially profitable. At age 16, Fossett was reported to be the third most profitable nail maker. Fully skilled, he was allowed to keep one-sixth of the money earned from his labor. Sharing earnings with enslaved persons was also unusual but Jefferson was then keeping 5 times that amount. They were or would, in a year, be free. Unable to marry, their common law wives and children would not.

Thomas Jefferson died freeing these three while still expecting them to "mostly be employed" in Charlottesville at the university he had founded. So long as they didn't leave, during their lifetimes a log cabin was provided with an acre of land convenient to where they would work, and to where wives, children and children not yet born were to stay enslaved. Antebellum Virginia law dictated that each child born to a free man and an enslaved woman creates another slave for her owner. Until these freedmen could purchase freedom for each family member they hoped to keep close, they were head of no household and lacked any leverage which would normally prove beneficial seeking employment or negotiating future pay.

== Notes ==
In 1805 President Jefferson wrote in his farm book regarding Burwell Colbert that he "paints and takes care of the house."

In his will of 1826, Thomas Jefferson wrote of Colbert: "I give to my good, affectionate, and faithful servant Burwell his freedom, and the sum of three hundred Dollars..."

In his 1860 memoir, Monticello overseer Edmund Bacon expressed his regard for faithful Burwell saying, "Mr. Jefferson gave him his freedom in his will, and it was right that he did so."

The other two slaves made free by Jefferson's will, though never acknowledged in its text, were his children, Madison and Eston, his youngest with Sally Hemings. His will named both boys as apprentices of John Hemings to be free only when they turned 21. Jefferson made a request for the Virginia legislature to confirm his bequest only for these two. This formality would help them travel. The absence of any money for trade tools that John received, no cabin and no spot of land anywhere to live, ensured these two would go. By comparison, the appreciation Jefferson felt for Burwell Colbert is seen.
