= John Hemings =

American woodworker

John Hemmings
- Born: 1776; Monticello, Albemarle County, Virginia
- Died: 1833 (aged 56–57)
- Occupations: Carpenter, cabinetmaker
- Spouse: Priscilla
- Parent(s): Betty Hemings; Joseph Neilson
- Relatives: Hemings family

John Hemmings (also spelled Hemings) (1776 – 1833) was an American woodworker. Born into slavery at Thomas Jefferson's Monticello as a member of the large mixed-race Hemings family, he trained in the Monticello Joinery and became a highly skilled carpenter and woodworker, making furniture and crafting the fine woodwork of the interiors at Monticello and Poplar Forest.

Hemmings also served as the master joiner to apprentices Beverley, Madison, and Eston Hemings, Jefferson's sons by Sally Hemings.

After decades of service, John Hemmings was freed in 1826 by Jefferson's will and given the tools to the joinery. He remained at Monticello until about 1831 and died in 1833.

== Early life and education ==
John Hemmings was born into slavery at Monticello on April 24, 1776. He was the youngest son of the enslaved, mixed-race Betty Hemings and his father was Joseph Neilson, an Irish workman and Jefferson's chief carpenter at Monticello. Hemmings was the eleventh of Betty's children and half-brother to her six children by her enslaver John Wayles, including Sally Hemings, as well as to the oldest four by an unknown father. Because of a 1655 Virginia House of Burgesses law that determined an individual's enslaved or free status through the individual's mother, John Hemings was enslaved despite his three-quarters European heritage. The Hemings family had come to Monticello through the Wayles family when John Wayles's daughter Martha Wayles married Thomas Jefferson.

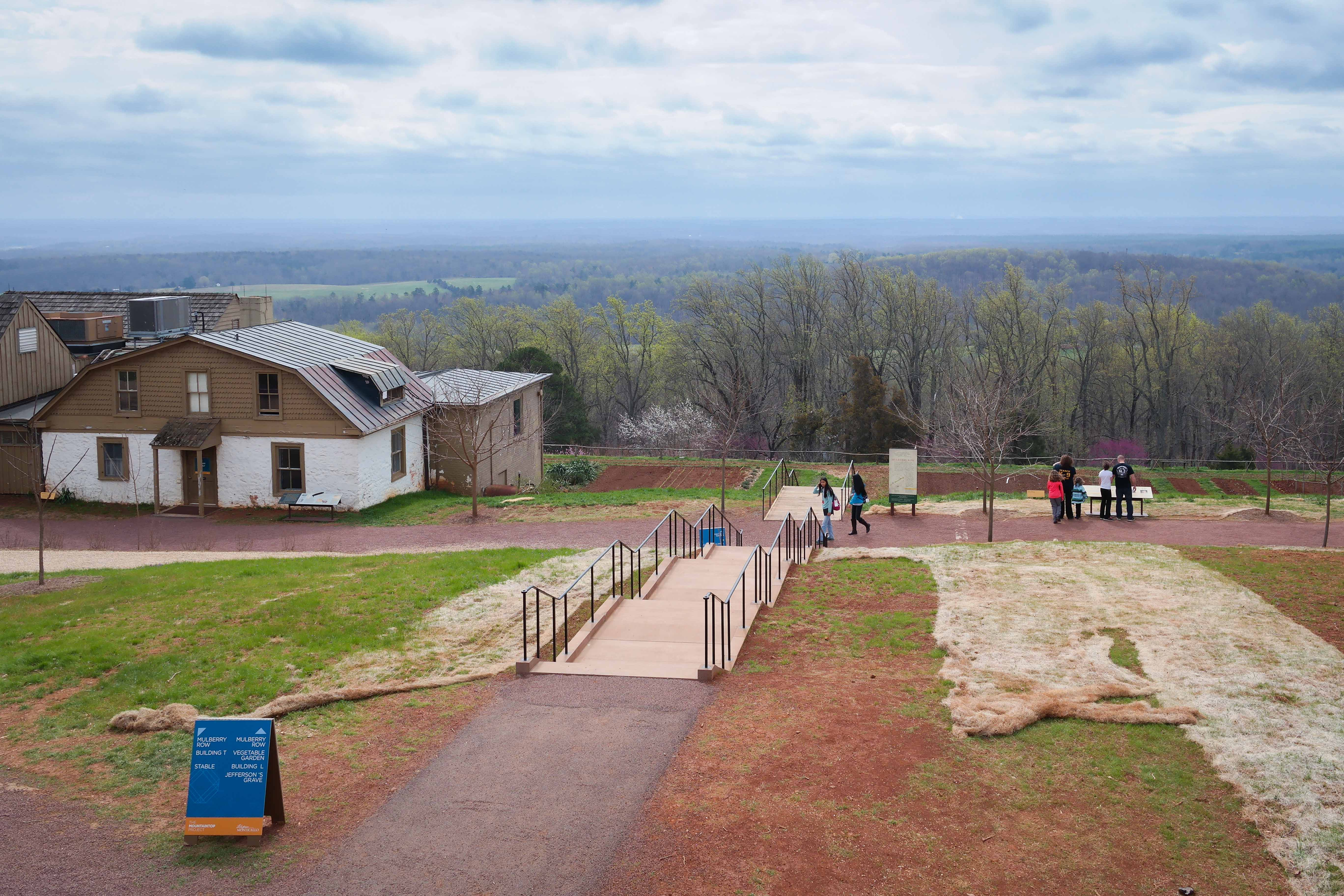
A view of where the Mulberry Row slave cabins once stood.

The vast majority of the Hemings family stayed within close proximity of each other for much of their lifetimes, as Thomas Jefferson's slave rolls at Monticello rarely changed. As many as 70 family members comprising five different generations of the family lived at Monticello. Due to this stability, the members of the Hemings family would have interacted with each other every day.

Hemings children grew up with the understanding that the girls would become house servants and that the boys would become butlers or valets, or perhaps artisans who worked in the many outbuildings on Mulberry Row. Jefferson allowed the Hemings family members a greater amount of agency than was typical for the period: the men were allowed to travel by themselves, learn trades, and hire themselves out on free days and keep the extra wages. The Hemings women were not responsible for any agricultural work and instead performed chores and housework like childcare, sewing, and baking.

As a child, Hemmings was a fieldworker. At age 14, Hemmings worked as an "out-carpenter" working in the woods and fields chopping trees and building fences, barns and three of the slave cabins on Mulberry Row at Monticello. At some point, Hemmings also learned how to read and write, although exactly when and who taught him is unclear; unlike the rest of his family, he spelled his name with a double m.

== Marriage and family ==
Although Virginian law then forbade marriages between enslaved people, John married Priscilla and had a lifelong partnership with her. Priscilla served as the nursemaid for Thomas Jefferson's daughter Martha Randolph's children, first at Edge Hill three miles away from Monticello, but later Priscilla lived with John after Martha Randolph moved to Monticello. The Jefferson grandchildren were fond of Hemmings; they reportedly called him "Daddy" and asked him to make them little wooden presents when they visited his cabin on Mulberry Row, and he wrote letters to Jefferson's granddaughter Septimia Randolph. Priscilla and John were described as highly devout, and they held religious services in their cabin. They had no children, although they were close with Sally Hemings's three boys. When Priscilla died in 1830, Hemmings spent over a year carving her headstone.

== Career ==
In the Monticello Joinery, Thomas Jefferson hired white joiners to train and work alongside enslaved joiners. John Hemmings received his first instructions at 17 years of age in 1793, when Thomas Jefferson wrote to his son-in-law Tom Randolph and asked Randolph to make sure Hemmings received training from the house joiner David Watson to fashion wheels and work with wood. The Monticello Joinery was well-stocked, as Jefferson was intensely engaged in refashioning his properties, and always had projects to complete. Hemmings, therefore, had the benefit of both materials and experience. Hemmings later worked as principal assistant to James Dinsmore, another Monticello joiner.

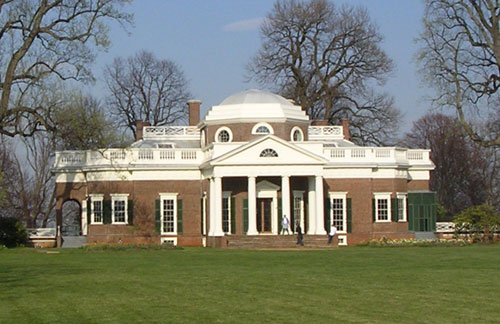
Thomas Jefferson's Monticello. The green enclosure Hemmings crafted is visible on the right-hand side of the house.

At the Monticello Joinery, Hemmings contributed to the improvements Jefferson made to Monticello and the construction of Poplar Forest.

At Monticello, Jefferson asked Hemings and Dinsmore to build small enclosures at the south side of the building with louvered blinds that enclosed his living quarters and blocked outside views into his bedroom and study. Hemmings fashioned one of the enclosures into an aviary, likely for Jefferson's mockingbirds. Hemmings independently completed the Chinese railing, Venetian blinds, cellar sashes, bedchamber closet, and window shutters at Monticello.

Jefferson began constructing his octagonal house, Poplar Forest, in 1806 and finished around 1809. At Poplar Forest, Hemmings created the classical trim on the interior and completed work on the roof, including the decorative railing. He also installed a large central skylight and repaired it after a storm in 1819, installed plaster ornaments made by sculptor William Coffee, and made repairs to the house after a roof leak in 1819 and a fire in 1825. Hemmings took Jefferson's sons Beverley, Madison, and Eston Hemings to Poplar Forest to teach them the basics of carpentry and joining.

In 1809, Hemmings assumed responsibility for the Monticello joinery. At this time, most of the exterior of Monticello was finished, but the interior was not yet complete, and most of the furniture was decades old. The joinery changed focus and began creating furniture for Monticello and Jefferson's second home at Poplar Forest. The Monticello Joinery was responsible for desks, chairs, and tables, often created from Jefferson's designs. Hemmings likely made much of the furniture and other woodwork created in the Monticello joinery after 1809, but only eight works are positively attributed to him through records: a "Campeachy" (campeche) chair, boxes made to hold books Jefferson sold to Congress, a desk for Jefferson's granddaughter Ellen Randolph Coolidge, a bedstead, a chess table, Pembroke tables, a hanging cabinet, and a dressing table. The boxes were destroyed, the desk was lost in a shipwreck, the Pembroke tables likely were destroyed in a fire at Poplar Forest, and the bedstead and dressing table remain unlocated. The hanging cabinet, made of walnut and poplar and meant to house the doll clothes of Jefferson's granddaughter Septimia Anne Randolph, was bequeathed to the Thomas Jefferson Memorial Foundation in 1957.

The mahogany Campeachy chair Hemmings fashioned for Jefferson between 1809 and 1819 was sold to the Thomas Jefferson Memorial Foundation in 1970. Hemmings created this chair for Jefferson after Jefferson, wanting a chair in this style made popular in New Orleans and unable to procure one, described the chair's design to Hemmings. Jefferson finally received a chair in 1818, after Hemmings had made a version, but Hemmings quickly created at least two more chairs later with the actual chair as a model. At least one attributed to Hemmings still exists.

Hemmings considered the writing desk he made for Ellen Randolph Coolidge his masterpiece. Both he and Jefferson were devastated to learn that it had been lost in a shipwreck on its way to her. Among the other Hemmings projects lost to time is a four-person landau carriage that Hemmings fashioned in 1814 for an aging Thomas Jefferson, who became tired of making his thrice-yearly visits to Poplar Forest on horseback. Hemmings created all the necessary parts for the carriage; his relative Joseph Fossett completed the ironwork, and another relative, Burwell Colbert, painted the finished carriage. The finished product was a source of great pride for Jefferson.

John Hemmings had some woodworking signatures that helped distinguish his work from other workers at the Monticello Joinery. They include attaching shelves to the sides of a cupboard, using double-bead molding on the front of shelves, and curving the molding on bed frames.

After Hemmings became master craftsman of the Monticello Joinery, he trained other enslaved people, including Thomas Jefferson's three sons by Sally Hemings. At 14, Beverley, Madison, and Eston each became apprentices to Hemmings and learned to be highly skilled carpenters.

Thomas Jefferson and John Hemmings developed a working relationship. They wrote letters to each other and shared drawings about woodworking and the work being done on both of Jefferson's houses; twelve of the letters survive. Hemmings also informed Jefferson when Nace, a person enslaved at Poplar Forest, stole produce from the house garden. Jefferson rewarded Hemmings with an annual bonus, beginning in 1811, of fifteen to twenty dollars, or about one month's wages. When Jefferson became ill, Hemmings nursed him for two months and helped him to walk.

On April 16, 1826, an ailing Thomas Jefferson prepared his will. In it, he stipulated that John Hemmings would be freed as of a year after his death, given all the tools of his trade, and gifted a life estate in a house and an acre of land, provided that he stayed close to his wife, Priscilla. His likely next place of employment was the new University of Virginia. Hemmings was one of five members of the Hemings family freed in Jefferson's will. Hemmings was also given the service of his two nephews and apprentices, Madison and Eston Hemings, until they turned twenty-one; as Madison was already of age when Jefferson penned his will, he was freed immediately upon Jefferson's death.

Thomas Jefferson died on July 4, 1826. He was buried in a coffin that John Hemmings spent days, if not weeks, fashioning from wood he saved in the joinery for this purpose. Jefferson's death made John Hemmings a free man at fifty-one.

Hemmings continued to live and work for wages at Monticello after Jefferson died in 1826, until about 1831 when the house was sold. Jefferson's daughter, Martha Randolph, lived in the house until this time. In 1830, Hemmings lost his wife, Priscilla, and he started drinking heavily and stopped working. The loss of his family and his craft caused him to sink into a depression. Although it was a stipulation of his freedom to continue living near the University of Virginia, it does not appear that Hemmings ever worked there. Little is known of Hemmings's whereabouts after 1831. The last trace of his existence is a court record of Hemmings registering with the county court on September 16, 1831, as all freedmen were required to do. This court registration gives the only surviving description of John Hemmings; according to the court records, he was just over five feet five inches tall, of a light complexion, and had a small scar on his right wrist. John Hemmings died in 1833.

== Legacy ==
Monticello has recently begun rebuilding some of the slave cabins on Mulberry Row, which were torn down sometime in the 19th century. One of the slave cabins is a reconstructed and refurnished recreation of the cabin John Hemmings, and his wife Priscilla shared. The interior furnishings of the cabin are taken from a description given by one of Jefferson's grandchildren in her diary. Monticello also offers a tour exploring the Hemings family experience at Monticello through seven of its members. The Joinery no longer stands, but the foundation and the chimney are still there.

In 2012, Slavery at Jefferson's Monticello: Paradox of Liberty, an exhibition co-presented by the National Museum of African American History and Culture and the Thomas Jefferson Foundation at Monticello, opened in the NMAAHC Gallery at the National Museum of American History. This exhibition highlighted Jefferson's paradoxical dual positions as the drafter of the Declaration of Independence and a slaveholder. Some objects on display were the "Campeachy" (campeche) chair Hemmings created for Jefferson, a copy of the French chairs at Monticello attributed to the joinery, and a hanging cabinet Hemmings made.

The entrance to Slavery at Jefferson's Monticello: Paradox of Liberty featured a large statue of Jefferson standing in front of stacks of bricks. Each of the bricks was stamped with the name of one of the 607 people Jefferson enslaved in his lifetime, including the name of John Hemmings. This statue is visible today in the Paradox of Liberty section of the National Museum of African American History and Culture.

== See also ==
- Sally Hemings
- Jefferson–Hemings controversy
- Monticello
- Poplar Forest
