= Betty Hemings =

Mother of Sally Hemings

- Born: Elizabeth Hemings c. 1735 perhaps Bermuda Hundred, Chesterfield County, Virginia
- Died: 1807 (aged 71–72); Monticello, Albemarle County, Virginia
- Occupation: Housekeeping
- Children: 12, including Mary, James, Sally, and John
- Relatives: See Hemings family

Elizabeth Hemings (c. 1735 – 1807) was an enslaved woman of mixed ethnicity in colonial Virginia. With her enslaver, planter John Wayles, it is claimed she had six children, including Sally Hemings. These children were three-quarters white, and, following the condition of their mother, they were considered slaves from birth; they were possibly half-siblings to Wayles's daughter, Martha Jefferson. After Wayles died, the Hemings family and some 120 other enslaved people were inherited, along with 11,000 acres and £4,000 debt, as part of his estate by his daughter Martha and her husband Thomas Jefferson.

More than 75 of Betty's mixed-race children, grandchildren, and great-grandchildren were born into slavery. They were forced to work on Jefferson's plantation of Monticello. Many had higher status positions as chefs, butlers, seamstresses, weavers, carpenters, blacksmiths, gardeners, and musicians in the household. Jefferson gave some of Betty's enslaved descendants to his sister and daughters as wedding presents, and they lived on other Virginia plantations.

Betty's oldest daughter Mary Hemings became the common-law wife of wealthy merchant Thomas Bell, who purchased her and two of their 6 children from Jefferson in 1792 and granted them greater freedoms than other enslaved people were typically permitted. Mary was the first of several Hemingses to gain freedom before the American Civil War. Betty's daughter Sally Hemings had six children, all of whom are believed to have been fathered by Thomas Jefferson, between 1795 and 1808. Jefferson freed all four of her surviving children when they came of age; two of them by his will. His daughter Martha Randolph gave Sally "her time," an informal freedom allowing her to live with her sons during her last decade of life.

== Biography ==
According to the oral history of her descendants, Betty was the daughter of a "White captain of an English trading vessel" and "a full-blooded African" mother, making Elizabeth a mulatto. In his memoir, Madison Hemings said the captain's surname was Hemings; the family tradition was that he had tried to buy Betty when he discovered his daughter had been born. Annette Gordon-Reed speculated that Elizabeth's mother's name was Parthenia, based on the wills of Francis Eppes IV and John Wayles. The place of her birth is uncertain (Hemings said it was Williamsburg), but by 1746 Betty was recorded as the property of Francis Eppes IV of the Bermuda Hundred plantation.

Betty's grandson Madison Hemings related the family tradition that Betty was born into slavery as the property of "John Wales" (meaning he owned her mother. The family said Captain Hemings plotted to kidnap his daughter, but Wayles took measures against this.) Wayles may have sold Betty to Francis Eppes and later regained ownership of her when he married Eppes' daughter Martha as his first wife, or else Betty's grandson Madison may have confused some of the chronology.

After John Wayles married Martha Eppes in 1746, her father Francis Eppes IV gave the couple Betty and her mother as part of his daughter's wedding settlement. He stipulated that Betty would always belong to Martha and her heirs (rather than being part of her husband's property). Betty was trained as a domestic servant at one of Wayles's plantations.

In the 1750s, Betty Hemings gave birth to the first four of her twelve children, whose father was also enslaved. The children were:

- Mary (1753 – after 1834), recognized as a seamstress; she was hired out to Thomas Bell and later purchased by him in 1792; she became his common-law wife and they had two children together. He informally freed her and their two children, and willed them his estate in Charlottesville. Jefferson kept her older children at Monticello as enslaved workers (see her page); Mary Hemmings' daughter Betty Hemmings had a common-law relationship with John Wayles Eppes after his first wife Mary Jefferson Eppes died as a result of childbirth.
- Martin Hemings (1755 - after 1795), who became the butler at Monticello;
- Betty Brown (1759 – after 1831). Already serving as the personal servant of Martha Wayles Skelton, Betty accompanied her to Monticello after Skelton's marriage to Thomas Jefferson. She was among the domestic enslaved workers the Jeffersons took to Williamsburg and Richmond when the planter was governor. During the British invasion of Richmond in 1781, Betty and her sister Mary Hemings were taken as prisoners of war. Betty's two sons were Wormley Hughes (1781–1858) and Burwell Colbert (1783 – c. 1862), who both served Jefferson as adults. Colbert served for decades as the butler and personal valet to Jefferson, who freed him by his will of 1826.)
- Nance Hemings (1761 – after 1827), in 1785, Jefferson gave her to his sister as a wedding gift. Ten years later, he repurchased her, as she was a skilled weaver; he had started a cotton factory at Monticello.

Betty's enslaver, John Wayles, was widowed three times. In 1761, after the death of his third wife, Wayles supposedly began a relationship with Betty that produced six children. If that is true, they were half-siblings to his eldest daughter Martha Wayles, who married Thomas Jefferson. As the historians Philip D. Morgan and Joshua D. Rothman have written, there were numerous such interracial relationships in the Wayles-Hemings-Jefferson families and Albemarle County and Virginia, often with multiple generations repeating the pattern. Her children by Wayles were:

- Robert Hemings (1762–1819), who purchased his freedom from Thomas Jefferson in 1794;
- James Hemings (1765–1801), freed by Jefferson in 1796 after training his brother Peter for three years to replace him as a chef;
- Thenia Hemings (1767–1796), who was sold to James Monroe in 1794.
- Critta Hemings Bowles (1769–1850), who married Zachariah Bowles, a free man of color. Sometimes called Critty, she was a domestic slave at Monticello from 1775 until 1827, when most of Jefferson's slaves were sold following his death. Critta was purchased and freed by Francis W. Eppes, whom she had cared for as a nurse when he was young, starting in 1802. (His parents were John Wayles Eppes and Mary Jefferson Eppes, Jefferson's second daughter, who had died young). She then lived with her husband at his 96-acre farm north of Charlottesville in Albemarle County. She had a son, James, who was a carpenter at Monticello. After cruel treatment by a white overseer, Gabriel Lilly, he ran away in about 1804.
- Peter Hemings (1770 – after 1834), served as chef to Jefferson after being trained by his brother James; and
- Sally Hemings (c. 1773 – 1835), who had a relationship with Jefferson from about 1789. She had seven children, five of whom survived and whom Jefferson freed. Sally was with him to his death in 1826, after which she was "given her time" (informal freedom) by his surviving daughter Martha Randolph.

After Wayles died in 1773, all eleven members of the Hemings family and 124 other slaves were inherited by his daughter Martha Wayles and her husband Thomas Jefferson. The Jeffersons had the Hemings mixed-race children trained as skilled artisans and domestic servants, giving them privileged positions at the plantation. No member of the Hemings family worked in the fields.

While resident at Monticello, Betty Hemings had two more children:

- John Hemings (1776–1833), whose father was Irish workman Joseph Neilson; John was freed in Jefferson's will after decades of service as a skilled carpenter; and
- Lucy Hemings (1777–1786), whose father was believed to have been enslaved.

Betty Hemings had her own cabin at Monticello in the last decade of her life, from 1795 to 1807. She raised produce and sold it to the Jefferson household: cabbages, strawberries, and chickens. Her former cabin site is being investigated as an archeological site. It is expected to yield new information about the daily lives of the enslaved population at Monticello.

== John Wayles ==
Historians have tended to accept that Betty Hemings and John Wayles had children together. Her last six children were multiracial, with three-quarters white ancestry. As is the case of many relationships between slaveholders and enslaved workers, documentary evidence is slight. Betty was mentioned in John Wayles's will, which some take as an indication of a relationship. However, the marriage contract between John Wayles and Martha Eppes stipulated that Betty, her mother, and their descendants should go to Martha Wayles and her heirs forever. According to contemporary accounts, some of Betty's children (including Sally) appeared nearly white. Other support is found in private letters from the first decade of the 19th century, which later became public.

The enslaved community at Monticello was aware of the relationship. In 1873 Betty's grandson Madison Hemings and Israel Jefferson, both former enslaved workers at Monticello, published newspaper interviews which said Wayles was the father of Sally Hemings and several other of Betty's children.

== Descendants ==
Betty Hemings has numerous descendants. Some of note are:

From the family line of daughter Sally Hemings
Madison Hemings - 2x great-grandson Frederick Madison Roberts, first African-American state politician in California;
Eston Hemings Jefferson - great-grandson John Wayles Jefferson, accepted as white and served as a colonel in the regular Army in the Civil War and wealthy cotton broker; 2x great-grandson Walter Beverly Pearson, white industrialist; John Weeks Jefferson, white descendant whose DNA matched that of the Jefferson male line in 1998 test.

From the family line of daughter Mary Hemings
James Monroe Trotter husband of Mary's great-great-granddaughter Virginia Isaacs
William Monroe Trotter, activist for civil rights and abolition in Boston

Fountain Hughes was a descendant of Wormley Hughes, one of Betty's grandsons who worked for Jefferson at Monticello. At the reported age of 101 [disputed; probably ~92], when living in Baltimore in 1949, Fountain Hughes gave what is believed to be the last surviving recorded interview of a former enslaved person. It is available online through the World Digital Library and the American Folklife Center of the Library of Congress.
