= Malvern Hill =

Historic house in Virginia, United States

- U.S. National Register of Historic Places
- Virginia Landmarks Register
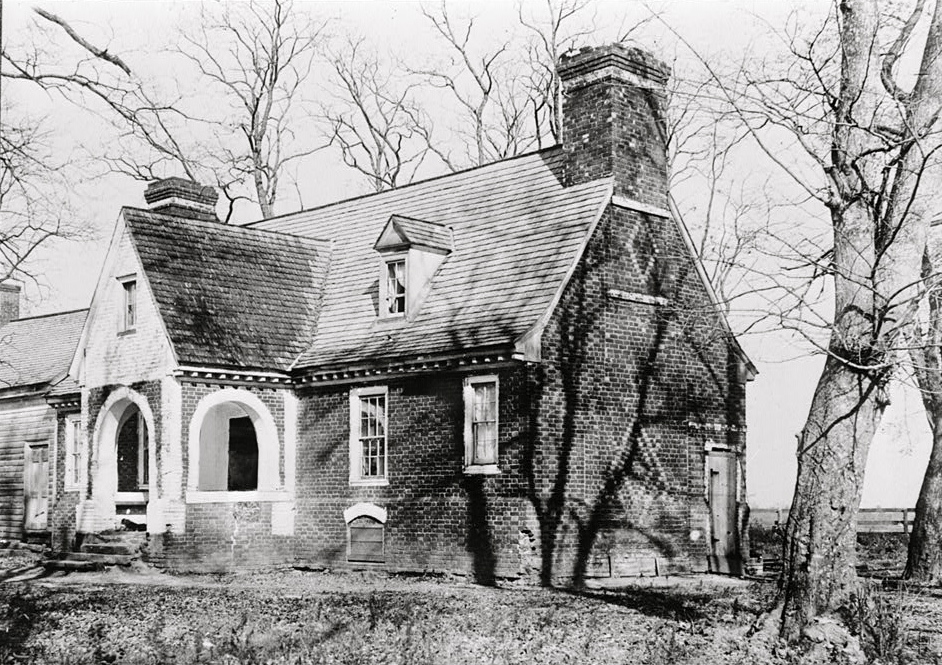
- Malvern Hill, before its destruction by fire

- Location within Virginia Location within the United States
- Nearest city: Richmond, Virginia
- Coordinates: 37°23′52″N 77°14′28″W
- Area: 0 acres (0 ha)
- NRHP reference No.: 69000248
- VLR No.: 043-0008

Significant dates
- Added to NRHP: November 12, 1969
- Designated VLR: May 13, 1969

Malvern Hill stands on the north bank of the James River in Henrico County, Virginia, USA, about 18 miles southeast of Richmond. On 1 July 1862, it was the scene of the Battle of Malvern Hill, one of the Seven Days Battles of the American Civil War.

The name referred primarily to the house built by Thomas Cocke in the 17th century, which remained in his family for many years. It was named after the Malvern Hills in England. The historic home was gutted by a fire in 1905, but ruins stood into the 1970s. The east end wall of the Malvern Hill ruins still stood when the property was surveyed for the Henrico County 1976 Inventory of Early Architecture and Historic Sites. It incorporated "the brick chimney of an earlier frame house probably built in the late 17th century, [which] constitute [d] the oldest standing man-made structure in Henrico County". The diaper-patterned glazed headers in the chimney were among the earliest example of decorative brickwork in the American colonies. Now, the Malvern Hill ruins have almost completely fallen over. Only a portion of the northeast and southeast comers were still readily evident in the 1995 survey update, when the Malvern Hill ruins stood in a pasture. Livestock have hastened their continuing deterioration. Their current condition is unknown.

The home site figured in three wars. Lafayette camped there twice in 1781 during the American Revolutionary War. Virginia militia also camped there in the War of 1812. However, it is best known as the site of bloody Battle of Malvern Hill in 1862, during the American Civil War.

In August 2016, the 871-acre Malvern Hill Farm was listed for sale for $10.6 million by the descendants of William H. Ferguson Sr. (1885–1984). It was purchased by the non-profit Capital Region Land Conservancy (CRLC) in February 2018 for $6.6 million. CRLC subsequently recorded conservation easements to protect 465 acres with the Virginia Department of Historic Resources and 25 acres with the Virginia Outdoors Foundation. Portions of the property were then gifted to Henrico County for the future site of an open space area for education and passive recreation as well as the James River Association for a canoe/kayak launch into Turkey Island Creek that flows into the James River at Presquile National Wildlife Refuge. Capital Region Land Conservancy is holding the remaining 380 acres to be included into the National Park Service Richmond National Battlefield Park.
