= Sally Hemings =

Slave of Thomas Jefferson (c. 1773–1835)

- Born: Sarah (or Sally) Hemings c. 1773; Charles City County, Virginia, British America
- Died: 1835 (aged 61–62); Charlottesville, Virginia, U.S.
- Known for: Enslaved woman owned by Thomas Jefferson, mother to his shadow family
- Children: 6, including Beverly, Harriet, Madison, and Eston
- Parent(s): Betty Hemings; John Wayles
- Relatives: Hemings family

Sally Hemings, whose given name may have been Sarah, (c. 1773 – 1835) was an enslaved woman, inherited among many others by the third President of the United States, Thomas Jefferson, from his father-in-law, John Wayles. Her mother was Elizabeth "Betty" Hemings. Her father was Wayles, the enslaver of Betty Hemings, who owned her from the time of her birth. Wayles was also the father of Jefferson's wife, Martha Wayles, making Hemings the half-sister to Jefferson's wife.

According to her son Madison, Hemings's maternal grandmother was an enslaved African woman whose name is not recorded and her maternal grandfather was John Hemings, an English captain. If true, Hemings was of 3/4 European and 1/4 African descent, making her a quadroon according to contemporaneous American racial classification. This aligns with recorded descriptions of her as "light colored" and "mighty near white . . . [with] long straight hair down her back." Madison's report of her lineage would also make her the third generation of women in her family to be impregnated by a free man during her enslavement and the second to be impregnated by the man she was enslaved to.

In 1787, Hemings accompanied Jefferson's daughter Martha Jefferson Randolph to Paris, France, where they joined him. Hemings was legally free in France, because slavery was illegal there, but continued to serve as Jefferson's servant. Some time during Hemings's 26 months in Paris, Jefferson is believed to have begun intimate relations with her. She was an adolescent between the ages of 14 and 16. Jefferson was in his mid-40s and was a widower. As attested by her son, Madison Hemings, Hemings agreed with Jefferson to return to Virginia and resume her life in slavery. In exchange, Jefferson agreed to free her children when they came of age. Jefferson or his will freed the four of Hemings' children that survived into adulthood as they came of age. Additional samples of Thomas Jefferson's hair were identified in the 21st century and were used to create a Jefferson DNA profile, against which those of known descendants were compared. The later DNA testing conclusively proved that Jefferson fathered Hemings' sons, Madison and Eston. Descendants of Hemings’ two older surviving children, Beverley and Harriet Hemings, who both reportedly married white spouses and lived as white, have not thus far been identified. Hemings died in Charlottesville, Virginia, in 1835 in the home of her freed sons.

In the U.S., where Hemings was enslaved to Jefferson, he exercised near total legal, economic, and physical control over her life. As an enslaved person, Hemings would not have been able to refuse sexual access without risk of punishment, sale, or violence, and any absence of recorded force reflects the structural secrecy and power imbalance inherent in slavery rather than evidence of voluntariness. Under these conditions, meaningful consent is generally considered impossible. Some therefore describe Jefferson's actions as sexual exploitation or a "forced embrace" within chattel slavery, though some historians argue that their relationship was built on mutual attraction and affection despite the power imbalance between the two.

Prior to the release of a 2026 study establishing that Jefferson fathered Hemings’ children, historians broadly agreed that Jefferson fathered all of Hemings's children over the course of several decades at his Monticello estate. This has led the Thomas Jefferson Foundation, an organization which has owned Monticello since 1923 and is dedicated to preserving and educating on Jefferson's legacy, to treat as a settled issue that Jefferson fathered all of Hemings's known children. In settling the issue, and following renewed historical analysis in the late 20th century, the Foundation empaneled a commission of scholars and scientists to investigate the parentage of Hemings's children. The Foundation panel worked with a 1998–1999 genealogical DNA test and found a match between the Jefferson male line and a descendant of Hemings's youngest son, Eston Hemings. Given this match, along with historical reports and information, the Foundation panel concluded that Jefferson fathered Eston and likely Hemings's other five children as well. In 2018, the Thomas Jefferson Foundation announced its plans to have an exhibit titled Life of Sally Hemings.

Some dissent remains, leading to the Jefferson–Hemings controversy. For example, in response to the Foundation Panel's 1999 finding, as well as to the growing historical consensus that Jefferson fathered Hemings's children, critics founded the Thomas Jefferson Heritage Society. The Society commissioned another panel of scholars in 2001, which concluded that it had not been proven that Thomas Jefferson fathered Sally Hemings' children. The Society's panel accepted that a male Jefferson fathered Hemings's children, but proposed that Randolph Jefferson or his sons may have been the father.

== Early life ==
Sally Hemings was born about 1773 to the enslaved Elizabeth "Betty" Hemings and her mother's owner, John Wayles. Betty's parents were a "full-blooded African" enslaved woman and a white English sea captain surnamed Hemings. Captain Hemings tried to purchase his daughter Betty from their enslaver, Francis Eppes, but the planter refused out of curiosity about how the mixed ethnicities would turn out in Betty. Upon Eppes' death his daughter, Martha Eppes, inherited Betty, and enslaved her in a personal capacity upon her marriage to Wayles.

Wayles was born to Edward and Ellen (née Ashburner) Wayles, in Lancaster, England. Following Martha's death, Wayles remarried and was widowed twice more. Several sources assert that Wayles took Betty Hemings as his concubine and that Sally was the youngest of the six children they had during the last 12 years of his life. These children were younger half-siblings to his daughters by his wives. His first child, Martha Wayles (named after her mother, Wayles' first wife), married the young planter and future president Thomas Jefferson.

The children of Betty Hemings and John Wayles were three-quarters European in ancestry and fair-skinned. According to the 1662 Virginia Slave Law, children born to enslaved mothers were considered enslaved under the principle of partus sequitur ventrem: the enslaved status of a child followed that of the mother. Betty and her children, including Sally Hemings and all Sally's children, were legally enslaved even though the fathers were their white enslavers and the children were of majority-European ancestry.

John Wayles died in 1773 and the next year his daughter Martha and her husband, Thomas Jefferson, inherited the Hemings family among a total of 135 enslaved people from Wayles' estate, along with 11,000 acres (4,500 ha) of land. Sally was an infant that year and about 25 years younger than Martha. She, her siblings, their mother Betty, and various other enslaved people were brought to Monticello, Jefferson's home. The mixed-race Wayles-Hemings children grew up at Monticello at the top of the enslaved hierarchy, and as such were trained and given assignments as skilled artisans and domestic servants. Betty Hemings' other children and their descendants, also mixed race, were bestowed privileged assignments as well. None worked in the fields, but were still enslaved people without any legal status or rights.

=== Appearance ===
The formerly enslaved Isaac (Granger) Jefferson described Hemings' physical appearance as "Sally was mighty near white. Sally was very handsome, long straight hair down her back". Jefferson's grandson Thomas Jefferson Randolph recalled her as "Light colored and decidedly good looking". She was 14 years old when she went to Europe, but stayed briefly with Abigail Adams in London before going to Jefferson in Paris, and Adams, who did not know her age, thought she appeared 15 or 16 at that time.

== Hemings in Paris ==
Sally Heming's son, Madison Hemings, on Hemings and Jefferson

My mother accompanied her [Jefferson's daughter, Maria] as her body servant. When Mr. Jefferson went to France Martha was a young woman grown, my mother was about her age, and Maria was just budding into womanhood. Their stay (my mother and Maria's) was about eighteen months. But during that time my mother became Mr. Jefferson's concubine, and when he was called home she was enceinte by him. He desired to bring my mother back to Virginia with him but she demurred. She was just beginning to understand the French language well, and in France she was free, while if she returned to Virginia she would be re-enslaved. So she refused to return with him. To induce her to do so he promised her extraordinary privileges, and made a solemn pledge that her children should be freed at the age of twenty-one years. In consequence of his promises, on which she implicitly relied, she returned with him to Virginia.

— Madison Hemings, Madison Hemings recollections, Pike County Republican, 13 Mar. 1873

In 1784, Thomas Jefferson was appointed the American envoy to France; he took his eldest daughter Martha (Patsy) with him to Paris, as well as several of the people he enslaved. Among them was Sally's elder brother James Hemings, who became a chef trained in French cuisine. Jefferson left his two younger daughters in the care of their aunt and uncle, Francis and Elizabeth Wayles Eppes of Eppington in Chesterfield County, Virginia. After his youngest daughter, Lucy Elizabeth, died in 1784 while Jefferson was away, Jefferson sent for his surviving daughter, nine-year-old Mary (Polly), to live with him. The teenaged enslaved Sally Hemings, was chosen to accompany Polly to France after an older enslaved woman became pregnant and could not make the journey. Correspondence between Jefferson and Abigail Adams indicates that Jefferson originally arranged for Polly to "be in the care of her nurse, a black woman, to whom she is confided with safety"; Adams wrote back: "The old Nurse whom you expected to have attended her, was sick and unable to come. She has a Girl about 15 or 16 with her."

Annette Gordon-Reed on Jefferson and Hemings

That a black woman in slavery would seek out a relationship with a slave master, or if not seek it out, not run away from it, is not a particularly attractive idea. Some view such a person as a traitor, giving the ultimate aid and comfort to the enemy. Our notions about women and sexuality probably play a major role in our discomfort about these situations. Sex between a slave master and a woman who was a slave has always been seen differently than sex between a slave mistress and a man who was a slave, both by whites and blacks. Whites tolerated the former because it posed no real threat to the established order. They claimed it did, but they did not react against it with the same vehemence that they did to relationships between slave males and white women, which were seen as threatening the social order and could never be tolerated. .... Most blacks probably would consider a slave woman who voluntarily joined a relationship with her master as a collaborator. On the other hand, they might see a black man who had a relationship with a white mistress as a rebel who was striking at the heart of the slave system. These ideas, rooted in our visions of sex roles, may have some validity as far as generalizations go. They do not take into account the differing circumstances and contexts in which such relationships could arise. Therefore, we should not allow them to control any serious consideration of an individual case.

— Annette Gordon-Reed, Thomas Jefferson and Sally Hemings: An American Controversy p. 191 Kindle edition

In 1787, Sally, aged 14 accompanied Polly to London and then to Paris. In London, they stayed with Abigail and John Adams from June 26 until July 10, 1787. Jefferson's associate, a Mr. Petit, arranged transportation and escorted the girls to Paris. In a letter to Jefferson on June 27, 1787, Abigail wrote:

The Girl [who appeared to Abigail to be 15 or 16] who is with [Polly] is quite a child, and Captain Ramsey is of opinion will be of so little Service that he had better carry her back with him. But of this you will be a judge. She seems fond of the child and appears good natured." On July 6, Abigail wrote to Jefferson, "The Girl she has with her, wants more care than the child, and is wholy incapable of looking properly after her, without some superiour to direct her.

The widowed Jefferson, aged 44 at the time, was serving as the United States Minister to France. Hemings spent two years there and most historians believe Jefferson and Hemings' sexual relationship began while they were in France or soon after their return to Monticello. The exact nature of their relationship remains unclear. The Monticello exhibition on Hemings acknowledged this uncertainty, while noting the power imbalance inherent in an intimate relationship between a successful, wealthy white male and a quarter-black enslaved female 30 years his junior. The president of the Thomas Jefferson Foundation said, "We really can't know what the dynamic was. Was it rape? Was there affection? We felt we had to present a range of views, including the most painful one." Hemings remained enslaved in Jefferson's house until his death in 1826. In 2017, a room identified as her quarters at Monticello, under the south terrace, was discovered in an archeological examination. It is being restored and refurbished.

Sally Hemings remained in France for 26 months. Slavery had been abolished in France after the Revolution in 1789. Jefferson paid wages to her and James while they were in Paris. He paid her the equivalent of $2 a month. In comparison, he paid James Hemings $4 a month as chef-in-training, and his Parisian scullion $2.50 a month; the other French servants earned from $8 to $12 a month. Toward the end of their stay, James used his money to pay for a French tutor and to learn the language, and Sally was also learning French.

There is no record of where she lived: it may have been with Jefferson and her brother in the Hôtel de Langeac on the Champs-Elysées, or at the convent Abbaye de Penthemont where the girls Maria and Martha were schooled. Whatever the weekday arrangements, Jefferson and his retinue spent weekends together at his villa. Jefferson purchased some fine clothing for Hemings, which suggests that she accompanied Martha as a lady's maid to formal events.

According to her son Madison's memoir, Hemings became pregnant by Jefferson in Paris. She was about 16 at the time. Under French law, Sally and James were free and could have petitioned to stay; a return to Virginia meant a return to slavery. She agreed to return with him to the United States in exchange for his promise to free her children when they came of age, at 21. Hemings' strong ties to her mother, siblings, and extended family likely drew her back to Monticello.

== Return to the United States and children's freedom ==
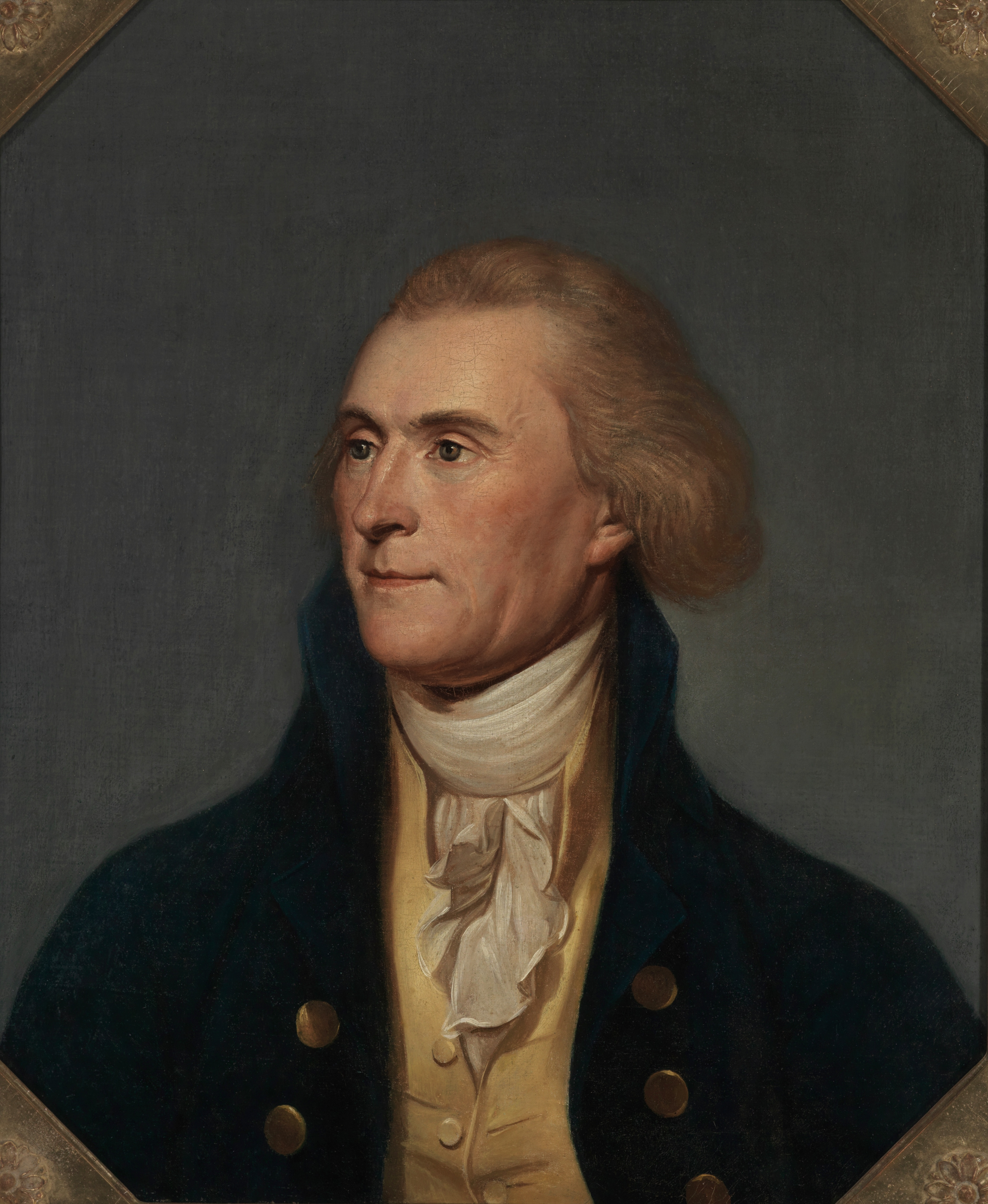
Thomas Jefferson in 1791

In 1789, Sally and James Hemings returned to the United States with Jefferson, who was 46 years old and seven years a widower. As shown by Jefferson's father-in-law, John Wayles, sexual relationships between wealthy Virginia widowers and enslaved females were not unknown. White society simply expected such men to be discreet about them.

According to Madison Hemings, Sally's first child died soon after her return from Paris. Hemings had six children after this; their complete names are in some cases uncertain:

- Harriet Hemings [I] (October 5, 1795– December 1797)
- Beverly Hemings, possibly William Beverley Hemings (April 1, 1798– after 1873)
- Thenia Hemings, named after Sally's sister (born in 1799 and died in infancy)
- Harriet Hemings [II] (May 1801– Unknown)
- Madison Hemings, possibly James Madison Hemings (January 19, 1805– November 28, 1877)
- Eston Hemings, possibly named Thomas Hemings (May 21, 1808– January 3, 1856)

Jefferson recorded births of enslaved people in his Farm Book. Unlike his practice in recording births of other enslaved persons, he did not identify the father of Sally Hemings' children. This could have been because one of his family members or even he himself fathered them, or it could have been that he simply did not know.

Sally Hemings' documented duties at Monticello included being a nursemaid-companion, lady's maid, chambermaid, and seamstress. It is not known whether she was literate, and she left no known writings. She was described as very fair. She is believed to have lived as an adult in a room in Monticello's "South Dependencies", a wing of the mansion accessible to the main house through a covered passageway.

In 2017, the Monticello Foundation announced that what they believe to be Hemings' room, adjacent to Jefferson's bedroom, had been found through an archeological excavation, as part of the Mountaintop Project. It was space that had been converted to other public uses in 1941. Hemings' room will be restored and refurbished as part of a major restoration project for the complex. Its goals include telling the stories of all the families at Monticello, both enslaved and free.

Hemings never married. Virginia law did not recognize the marriages of enslaved people, but many forced laborers at Monticello had recognized stable relationships with partners in common-law marriages. But unlike those others, Monticello records document Hemings in no such partnership, at any time. But she kept her children near her. According to her son Madison, while young, the children "were permitted to stay about the 'great house', and only required to do such light work as going on errands". At the age of 14, each of the children began their training: the brothers with the plantation's skilled master of carpentry, and Harriet as a spinner and weaver. The three boys were all taught and learned to play the violin, which Jefferson himself played.

In 1822, at the age of 24, Beverley left or "ran away" from Monticello and was not pursued. His sister Harriet Hemings, 21, followed in the same year, apparently with at least tacit permission. The overseer, Edmund Bacon, said that he gave her $50 ($1,131 in 2021) and put her on a stagecoach to the North, presumably to join her brother. In his memoir, published posthumously, Bacon said Harriet was "near white and very beautiful", and that people said Jefferson freed her because she was his daughter. Bacon did not believe this to be true, citing someone else coming out of Sally Hemings' bedroom. The name of this person was left out by Rev. Hamilton W. Pierson in his 1862 book because he did not wish to cause pain to anyone living at that time.

Jefferson formally freed two people whom he enslaved while he was alive: Sally's older brothers Robert, who bought his freedom, and James, who was required to train his brother Peter as a chef for three years to get his freedom. Jefferson eventually, including posthumously, through his will, freed all of Sally's surviving children, Beverly, Harriet, Madison, and Eston, as they came of age. Harriet was the only enslaved female Jefferson allowed to go free, and these were the only enslaved persons freed as they came of age. Of the hundreds of people he enslaved, Jefferson freed only five in his will, all men from the Hemings family. They were also the only enslaved family group freed by Jefferson. Sally Hemings' children were seven-eighths European in ancestry, and three of the four entered white society after gaining their freedom; their descendants likewise identified as white. His will also petitioned the legislature to allow the freed Hemingses to stay in the state.

No documentation has been found for Sally Hemings' own manumission. Jefferson's daughter Martha (Patsy) Randolph at least informally freed the elderly Hemings after Jefferson's death, by giving her "her time", as was a custom. As the historian Edmund S. Morgan has noted, "Hemings herself was withheld from auction and freed at last by Jefferson's daughter, Martha Jefferson Randolph, who was, of course, her niece," as Sally was a half-sister to Martha's mother, Jefferson's deceased wife. This informal freedom allowed Hemings to live in Virginia with her two youngest sons in nearby Charlottesville for the next nine years until her death. In the Albemarle County 1833 census, all three were recorded as free persons of color. Hemings lived to see a grandchild born in a house that her sons owned.

Although Jefferson inherited great wealth at a young age, he was bankrupt by the time he died. His estate, including those whom he enslaved (besides the Hemings), was sold at auction by his daughter Martha to repay his debts.

== Jefferson–Hemings controversy ==
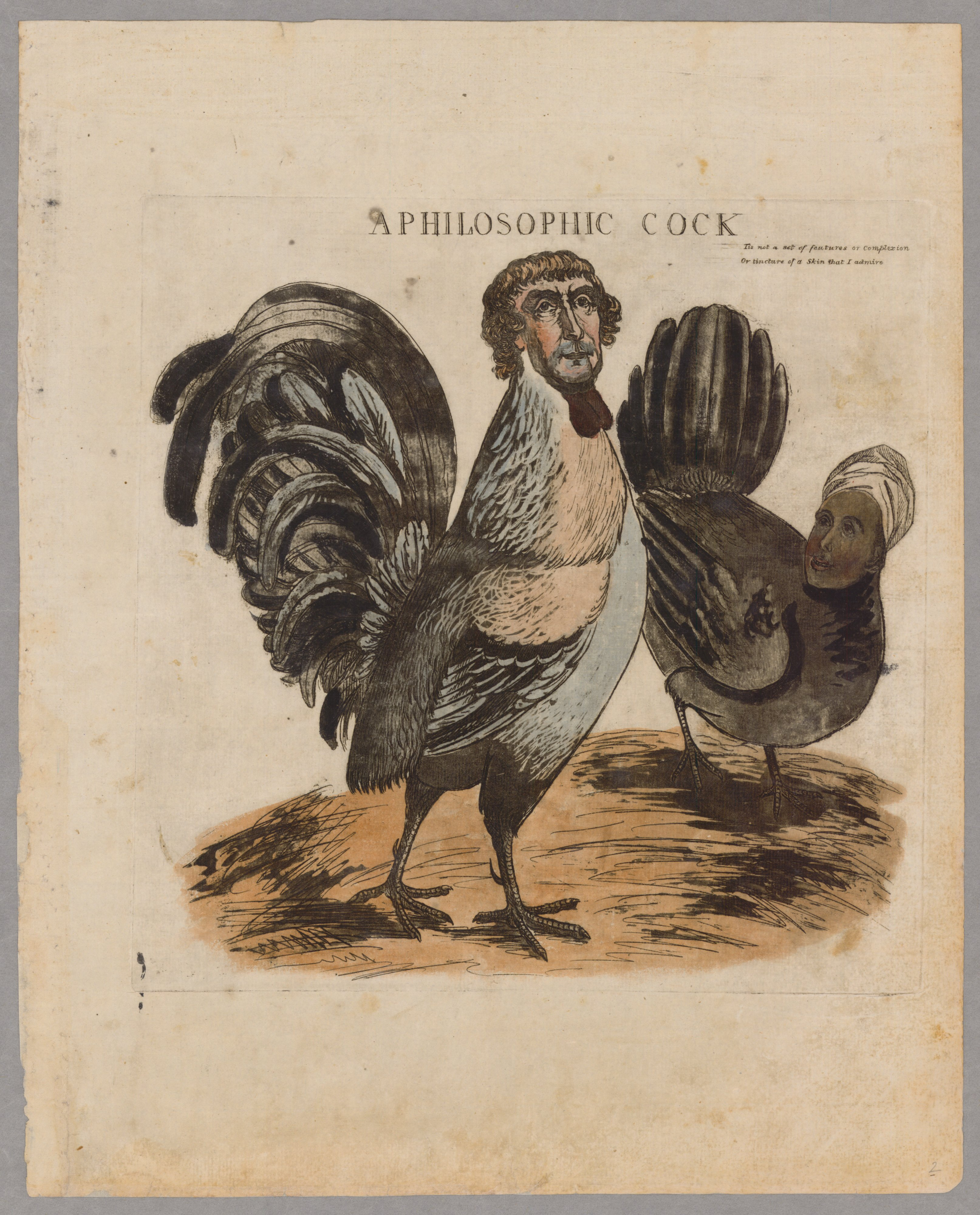
A caricature showing Thomas Jefferson and Sally Hemings as chickens, titled "A philosophic cock"; created circa 1804 and attributed to James Akin.

The Jefferson–Hemings controversy is the question of whether Jefferson impregnated Sally Hemings and fathered any or all of her six children of record. There were rumors of this as early as the 1790s. Jefferson's sexual relationship with Hemings was first publicly reported in 1802 by one of Jefferson's enemies, a political journalist named James T. Callender, after he noticed several light-skinned enslaved people at Monticello. He wrote that Jefferson "kept, as his concubine, one of his own slaves" and had "several children" by her. After that the story became widespread, spread by newspapers and by Jefferson's Federalist opponents.

Jefferson himself is never recorded to have publicly denied this allegation. However, several members of his family did. In the 1850s, Jefferson's eldest grandson, Thomas Jefferson Randolph, said that Peter Carr, a nephew of Jefferson, had fathered Hemings' children, rather than Jefferson himself. This information was published and became the common wisdom, with major historians of Jefferson denying Jefferson's paternity of Hemings' children for the next 150 years.

External videos
- Booknotes interview with Gordon-Reed on Thomas Jefferson and Sally Hemings, February 21, 1999, C-SPAN

In the late 20th century, historians began re-analyzing the body of evidence. In 1997, Annette Gordon-Reed published a book, Thomas Jefferson and Sally Hemings: An American Controversy, that analyzed the historiography of the debate, demonstrating how historians since the 19th century had accepted early assumptions. They favored Jefferson family testimony while criticizing Hemings family testimony as "oral history", and failed to note all the facts.

A consensus began to emerge after the results of a DNA analysis, commissioned in 1998 by Daniel P. Jordan, president of the Thomas Jefferson Foundation, which operates Monticello as a house museum and archive. The DNA evidence showed no match between the Carr male line, proposed for more than 150 years as the father(s), and the one Hemings descendant tested. It did show a match between the Jefferson male line and the Eston Hemings descendant.

Since 1998 and the DNA study, several historians have concluded that Jefferson maintained a long sexual relationship with Hemings and fathered six children with her, four of whom survived to adulthood. Others argued that the DNA instead supported a weaker conclusion, that "Thomas was only one of eight or more Jeffersons who may have fathered Eston Hemings". The Thomas Jefferson Foundation (TJF) published in 2000 an independent historic review in combination with the DNA data, as did the National Genealogical Society in 2001; scholars involved mostly concluded Jefferson might be the father of all Hemings' children.

In an interview in 2000, the historian Annette Gordon-Reed said of the change in historical scholarship about Jefferson and Hemings: "Symbolically, it's tremendously important for people ... as a way of inclusion. Nathan Huggins said that the Sally Hemings story was a way of establishing black people's birthright to America."

Outspoken critics, such as the Thomas Jefferson Heritage Society (TJHS, founded shortly after the DNA study), dispute Jefferson's paternity of Hemings' children. All but one of 13 TJHS scholars expressed considerable skepticism about the conclusions. The TJHS report suggested that Jefferson's younger brother Randolph Jefferson could have been the father – the DNA test cannot distinguish between Jefferson males. They also speculate that Hemings might have had consensual or non consensual sexual relations with multiple men. Three of the Hemings children were given names from the Randolph (surname) family, relatives of Thomas Jefferson through his mother. Herbert Barger, the founder and director-emeritus of the TJHS and the husband of a Jefferson descendant, assisted Foster in the DNA study. By contrast, all but one member of the DNA Study Committee commissioned by TJF thought that the DNA and documentary evidence combined made it probable that Thomas Jefferson was the father of one or more of the Hemings children.

from review of book The Hemingeses of Monticello: An American Family by Annette Gordon-Reed

Until very recently, American historians were no more receptive to arguments about a sexual relationship between Thomas Jefferson and Sally Hemings than The Da Vinci Code's Catholic Church was to a romance between Jesus and Mary Magdalene. The goal of the historians was to protect their hero from charges of hypocrisy. Dumas Malone, the greatest in a long line of Jefferson hagiographers, established the common wisdom when he wrote that an interracial sexual affair was "distinctly out of character, being virtually unthinkable in a man of Jefferson's moral standards and habitual conduct." Virginius Dabney concluded that given Jefferson's documented horror of miscegenation, "It would indeed have been the height of hypocrisy for a man who entertained such views and expressed them over most of his adult life to have sired mulatto children." Case closed. In a review of Fawn Brodie's Thomas Jefferson: An Intimate History (1974), which was the first scholarly work to credit the Jefferson-Hemings liaison, Garry Wills accepted the possibility of Jefferson having "sired" Sally Heming's seven children and saved his scorn for Brodie's contention that Jefferson and Hemings forged a deep emotional bond during an intimate relationship that lasted nearly forty years.

— Jane Dailey, Law and History Review, November 2010, Vol. 28, No. 4

TJF committee participant W. McKenzie Ken Wallenborn wrote a late-1999 minority report disagreeing with some aspects of the committee's full report, not made public until 2000. TJF also published this dissent in 2000. While Wallenborn concurred with the validity of the genetic testing and with the documentary research collected, he disputed some of the interpretation, and concluded: "The historical evidence is not substantial enough to confirm nor for that matter to refute [Jefferson's] paternity of any of the children of Sally Hemings."

He gave considerable weight to four pieces of non-genetic evidence. First are a pair of late letters of Jefferson to close associates which can be read as denials of adultery slanders spread by Federalist political enemies, though the letters do not specifically mention Hemings. Second is an unequivocal counterclaim made by Jefferson's foreman Edmund Bacon and published by H. W. Pierson, with the name of the alleged actual father redacted.

Third is that Col. Thomas Jefferson Randolph, who was frequently in his grandfather Thomas Jefferson's household and who worked as his farm manager and was later his estate executor, was reported to have denied that any relations between Jefferson and any of the Hemings women existed, but claimed that resident nephew Peter Carr was involved with Sally, while her niece Betsey was openly the mistress of his brother Samuel Carr, though this account is third-hand. Finally, some materials claimed that Martha Jefferson Randolph and her sons demonstrated that Thomas Jefferson and Sally Hemings had been separated for some fifteen months before the birth of the son "who most resembled" Jefferson, presumed by Wallenborn to be Eston Hemings.

In Wallenborn's view, it was thus quite possible that Sally Hemings bore children to multiple men in the Jefferson/Randolph/Carr clan, and that none of them was necessarily Thomas Jefferson, but that the children were just genetically close, a "Jefferson DNA Haplotype carrier" in at least one case. He conceded that the DNA results "enhance the possibility" of Jefferson's paternity of one or more of the Hemings children but do not prove it. This view is consistent with that expressed by the DNA study's lead, Eugene Foster, regarding what could or could not be concluded from the DNA evidence. While supporting TJF's continued education mission at Monticello, Wallenborn warned that "historical accuracy should never be overwhelmed by political correctness".

Lucia Cinder Stanton, writing for the majority of the committee, responded a month later with a rebuttal. She noted that the Jefferson, Bacon/Pierson, and Randolph material contained various ambiguities, partisanship, timeline errors, and contradictions or outright misrepresentations. She suggested that Madison Hemings probably knew who his father was, and there was no evidence that ghostwriter Wetmore injected fiction even if he polished the wording for print. She also indicated that the claim of a Jefferson–Hemings separation during one conception period cannot be sustained, and that Wallenborn did not correctly understand that material. Stanton stated outright that "Sally Hemings never conceived in Jefferson's absence." TJF president Jordan, though he had insisted on publication of the Wallenborn dissent, endorsed the Stanton rebuttal.

The next month, May 2000, the Thomas Jefferson Heritage Society (TJHS) emerged:

a group of concerned businessmen, historians, genealogists, scientists, and patriots formed ... as a response ... to efforts by many historical revisionists to portray Thomas Jefferson as a hypocrite, a liar, and a fraud." The new group's opening press release specifically accused the Thomas Jefferson Memorial Foundation (TJMF, now Thomas Jefferson Foundation, TJF) and its report of "shallow and shoddy scholarship ... to achieve an apparently desired conclusion.

Wallenborn, a former TJMF/TJF employee before his committee participate, and now a director of TJHS, produced in June a heated follow-up reply to Stanton's rebuttal. He claimed that many scholars agreed with his version, and that Jordan had contradicted his support of Stanton's, having expressing skepticism of a Jefferson–Hemings affair in a PBS-TV documentary, though it is unclear if this was recorded before the DNA research and subsequent report. Wallenborn repeated many of his original points in more detail; bolstered the potential reliability of Bacon while casting doubt of that of the Madison-via-Whetmore memoir; and insisted again that "the son of Sally that most resembled Thomas Jefferson" surely meant Eston, without any new evidence.

He added the argument that Madison Hemings' probable date of conception was close to that of the death of Jefferson's daughter Maria (arguably not a likely inspiration for sexual involvement); and that during Jefferson's presidency, Sally Hemings' exact whereabouts did not survive in any records. Wallenborn attempted to use two sets of records to show gaps in Jefferson's known location during some of the conception periods – but editorial interpolation of footnotes by Jordan with additional records closed those gaps in every case, supporting Stanton's claim. Wallenborn added another new observation, of what he called "some striking coincidences", that Sally Hemings' known pregnancies stopped, despite Thomas Jefferson's presence, after both his brother Randolph and Randolph's son Thomas married women outside Monticello, c. 1808 or 1809.

Wallenborn accused TJF of rushing the report to finalization without accounting for his objections, and concluded his letter in a much more hostile tone than in his original minority report: "If the Thomas Jefferson Foundation and the DNA Study Committee majority had been seeking the truth and had used accurate legal and historical information rather than politically correct motivation" that it would have written "it is still impossible to prove with absolute certainty whether Thomas Jefferson did or did not father any of Sally Hemings' five children" (emphasis in original). He continued: "This statement is accurate and honest and it would have helped discourage the campaign by leading universities (including Thomas Jefferson's own University of Virginia), magazines, university publications, national commercial and public TV networks, and newspapers to denigrate and destroy the legacy of one of the greatest of our founding fathers and one of the greatest of all of our citizens." TJF did not publish any further back-and-forth disputation.

In 2012, the Smithsonian Institution and the Thomas Jefferson Foundation held a major exhibit at the National Museum of American History: Slavery at Jefferson's Monticello: The Paradox of Liberty; it says that "the documentary and genetic evidence ... strongly support the conclusion that [Thomas] Jefferson was the father of Sally Hemings' children."

A study commissioned by the Smithsonian and published in September 2026 came to the conclusion that Thomas Jefferson had fathered Sally Hemings' children. There have been some criticisms of the study, including a Hemings' descendant withdrawing her consent, but the scientists doing the study said the study's conclusions were not changed by her withdrawal.

== Children's lives ==
In 2008, Gordon-Reed published The Hemingses of Monticello: An American Family, which explored the extended family, including James's and Sally's lives in France, Monticello and Philadelphia, during Thomas Jefferson's lifetime. She was not able to find much new information about Beverley or Harriet Hemings, who left Monticello as young adults, moving north and probably changing their names.

Madison Hemings' memoir (edited and put into written form by journalist S. F. Wetmore in the Pike County Republican in 1873) and other documentation, including a wide variety of historical records, and newspaper accounts, has revealed some details of the lives of the Beverley and Harriet, and younger sons Madison and Eston Hemings (later Eston Jefferson), and of their descendants. Eventually, three of Sally Hemings' four surviving children (Beverley, Harriet, and Eston, but not Madison) chose to identify as white adults in the North; they were seven-eighths European in ancestry, and this was consistent with their appearance. Harriet was described by Edmund Bacon, the longtime Monticello overseer, as "nearly as white as anybody, and very beautiful". In his memoir, Madison wrote that both Beverley and Harriet married well in the white community in the Washington, D.C., area. For some time, Madison wrote to Beverley and Harriet and learned of their marriages. He knew that Harriet had children and was living in Maryland. But gradually she and Beverley stopped responding to his letters, and the siblings lost touch. Madison also claimed publicly in the 1873 memoir that he was Thomas Jefferson's son, and he had done likewise on the 1870 U.S. census.

Both Madison and Eston married free women of color in Charlottesville. After their mother's death in 1835, they and their families moved to Chillicothe in the free state of Ohio. Census records classified them as "mulatto", at that time meaning mixed-race. The census enumerator, usually a local person, classified individuals in part according to who their neighbors were and what was known of them. Around 60 years later, a Chillicothe newswriter reminisced in 1902 about his acquaintance with Eston (then a well-known local musician), whom he described as "a remarkably fine looking colored man" with a "striking resemblance to Jefferson" recognized by others, who had already heard a rumors of his paternity and were credulous of it.

High demand for enslaved people in the Deep South and passage of the Fugitive Slave Act of 1850 heightened the risk for free black people of being kidnapped by slave catchers, as they needed little documentation to claim black people as fugitives. Legally free people of color, Eston and his family later moved to Madison, Wisconsin, to be farther away from slave catchers. There he changed his name to "Eston H. Jefferson" to acknowledge his paternity, and all his family adopted the surname. From then on, the Jeffersons lived in the white community.

Madison's family were the only Monticello Hemings descendants who continued to identify with the black community. They intermarried within the community of free people of color before the Civil War. Over time, some of their descendants passed into the white community, while many others continued within the black community.

Both Eston and Madison achieved some success in life, were well-respected by their contemporaries, and had children who built on their successes. They worked as carpenters, and Madison also had a small farm. Eston became a professional musician and bandleader, "a master of the violin, and an accomplished 'caller' of dances", who "always officiated at the 'swell' entertainments of Chillicothe". He was in demand across southern Ohio. The aforementioned journalist neighbor in Chillicothe described him thus: "Quiet, unobtrusive, polite and decidedly intelligent, he was soon very well and favorably known to all classes of our citizens, for his personal appearance and gentlemanly manners attracted everybody's attention to him."

== Grandchildren and other descendants ==
=== Madison's descendants ===
Madison's sons fought on the Union side in the Civil War. Thomas Eston Hemings enlisted in the 175th Ohio Infantry Regiment; captured, he spent time at the Andersonville POW camp and died in a POW camp in Meridian, Mississippi. According to a Hemings descendant, his brother James attempted to cross Union lines and "pass" as a white man to enlist in the Confederate army to rescue him. Later, James Hemings was rumored to have moved to Colorado and perhaps passed into white society. Like some others in the family, he disappeared from the record, and the rest of his biography remains unknown.

A third son, William Hemings, enlisted in the regular Union Army as a white man. Madison's last known male-line descendant, William, never married and was not known to have had children. He died in 1910 in a veterans' hospital.

Some of Madison Hemings' children and grandchildren who remained in Ohio suffered from the limited opportunities for blacks at that time, working as laborers, servants, or small farmers. They tended to marry within the mixed-race community in the region, who eventually became established as people of education and property.

Madison's daughter, Ellen Wayles Hemings, married Alexander Jackson Roberts, a graduate of Oberlin College. When their first son was young, they moved to Los Angeles, California, where the family and its descendants became leaders in the 20th century. Their first son, Frederick Madison Roberts (1879–1952) – Sally Hemings' and Jefferson's great-grandson – was the first person of known black ancestry elected to public office on the West Coast: he served for nearly 20 years in the California State Assembly from 1919 to 1934. Their second son, William Giles Roberts, was also a civic leader. Their descendants have had a strong tradition of college education and public service.

=== Eston's descendants ===
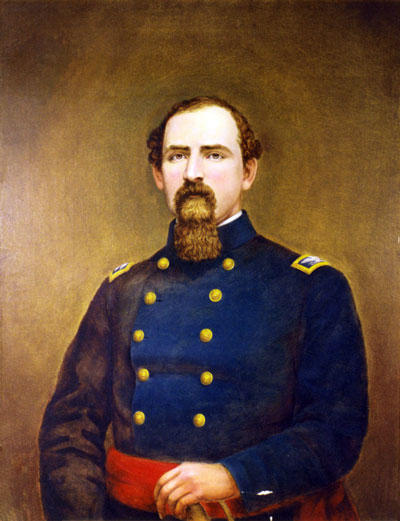
Colonel John Wayles Jefferson, a grandson of Hemings, through her son Eston

Eston's sons also enlisted in the Union Army, both as white men from Madison, Wisconsin. His first son John Wayles Jefferson had red hair and gray eyes like his grandfather Jefferson. By the 1850s, John Jefferson in his twenties was the proprietor of the American Hotel in Madison. At one time he operated it with his younger brother Beverley. He was commissioned as a Union officer during the Civil War, during which he was promoted to the rank of Colonel and served at the Battle of Vicksburg. He wrote letters about the war to the newspaper in Madison for publication. After the war, John Jefferson returned to Wisconsin, where he frequently wrote for newspapers and published accounts about his war experiences. He later moved to Memphis, Tennessee, where he became a successful and wealthy cotton broker. He never married or had known children, and left a sizeable estate.

Eston's second son, Beverley Jefferson, also served in the regular Union Army, as a white man. After operating the American Hotel with his brother John, he later separately operated the Capital Hotel. He also built a successful horse-drawn "omnibus" business. He and his wife Anna M. Smith had five sons, three of whom reached the professional class as a physician, attorney, and manager in the railroad industry. According to his 1908 obituary, Beverley Jefferson was "a likeable character at the Wisconsin capital and a familiar of statesmen for half a century". His friend Augustus J. Munson wrote, "Beverley Jefferson['s] death deserves more than a passing notice, as he was a grandson of Thomas Jefferson .... [He] was one of God's noblemen – gentle, kind, courteous, charitable." Beverley and Anna's great-grandson John Weeks Jefferson is the Eston Hemings descendant whose DNA was tested in 1998; it matched the Y-chromosome of the Thomas Jefferson male line.

There are known male-line descendants of Eston Hemings Jefferson, and known female-line descendants of Madison Hemings' three daughters: Sarah, Harriet, and Ellen.

== Cultural depictions of Sally Hemings ==
Sally Hemings has been the main subject of a novel, a television mini-series, a stage play, two operas, and an operatic oratorio. She is also the subject of the second half of the film Jefferson in Paris. She has also appeared as a supporting character or a subject of discussion in many other shows and stage productions.

The power dynamic between Hemings and Thomas Jefferson is portrayed in Titus Kaphar's Behind the Myth of Benevolence, a portrait of the founding father peeling back to reveal the nude figure of Hemings.

Jennie Lightweis-Goff draws a parallel between Hemings and La Malinche of Mexico, arguing that "Stories of captive women in the arms of white men are hollowed out for purposes of mythmaking: aspirational racial reconciliation or pure allegory of domination. Think of Sally Hemings, who was in her teens when she began bearing children by Thomas Jefferson; she has been reduced to either First Girlfriend or First Victim, depending on era and purpose...without attention to the complexities of [her life]."

== See also ==
- Thomas Jefferson and slavery
- List of slaves

== Sources ==
- Brodie, Fawn M. (1974). Thomas Jefferson: An Intimate History. W. W. Norton. ISBN 0-393-33833-9.
- Gordon-Reed, Annette (1997). Thomas Jefferson and Sally Hemings: An American Controversy. University of Virginia Press. ISBN 978-0-8139-1833-4.
  - Gordon-Reed, Annette (1998). Thomas Jefferson and Sally Hemings: An American Controversy. University of Virginia Press. ISBN 978-0-8139-1698-9. Reprint edition with new foreword.
- Thomas Jefferson, Thomas Jefferson's Farm Book (Thomas Jefferson Foundation, 2002) ISBN 1-882886-10-0
- Thomas Jefferson, Farm Book, 1774–1824, (electronic edition) Thomas Jefferson Papers: An Electronic Archive. Boston, Mass.: Massachusetts Historical Society, 2003
- Gordon-Reed, Annette (2008). The Hemingses of Monticello: An American Family. W. W. Norton. ISBN 978-0-393-33776-1.
