= John Wayles =

American planter, slave trader and lawyer

- Born: January 31, 1715; Lancaster, Great Britain
- Died: May 28, 1773 (aged 58); Charles City County, Virginia, British America
- Occupations: Lawyer; planter; tobacco agent; slave trader
- Spouses: Martha Eppes (m. 1746; died 1748) Tabitha Cocke (m. 1750, died) Elizabeth Lomax (m. 1760; died 1761)
- Partner: Betty Hemings (1761–1773) (Enslaved)
- Children: 13, including Martha Wayles, James Hemings, and Sally Hemings

John Wayles (January 31, 1715 – May 28, 1773) was a colonial American planter, slave trader and lawyer in colonial Virginia. He is historically best known as the father-in-law of Thomas Jefferson, the third president of the United States. Wayles married three times, with these marriages producing eleven children; only five of them lived to adulthood. Through his slave Betty Hemings, Wayles fathered six additional children, including Sally Hemings, who was the mother of six children by Thomas Jefferson and half-sister of Martha Jefferson.

== Early life and education ==
Wayles was born in the city of Lancaster on January 31, 1715. (Note: His parents may be Edward Wales and Ellen Ashburner of Bulk, Lancaster, who married on November 11, 1714, about one year before a John Wales was christened on August 14, 1715. They also had a daughter who was born in 1718. There were Wayles in Lancaster, with a "y" in their last name, and they were of the working class. There are different accounts of how John Wayles arrived in Colonial Virginia. One was that he was already trained as a lawyer. Another account is that he arrived as an indentured servant and later made his fortune.) The young Wayles likely became aware of the burgeoning transatlantic slave trade and "its ability to make merchants rich". Wayles emigrated as a young man to the Virginia Colony, likely during the 1730s.

== Career ==
Wayles received his licence to practice law in Virginia in 1741, entering into the profession the very same year. He began his legal career by traveling on horseback to plantations in the Tidewater, where he obtained work creating legal documents. He was also a prosecuting attorney in Henrico County. In Virginia, Wayles became part of the planter elite. His plantation, called "The Forest", (Note: "The Forest" plantation was home to Martha Wayles and the site of her marriage to Thomas Jefferson in 1772. The house no longer exists, but a historic marker on State Route 5 commemorates the site of Jefferson's wedding. It is located 15 miles southeast of Richmond. During the Civil War, The Forest was owned by a Confederate scout and the house was destroyed when it was set afire by Union troops.) was located in Charles City County.

Eventually becoming a slave trader, Wayles earned a fortune from the institution of slavery. He arranged for tobacco sales between planters in Virginia and buyers in Europe. In addition to these businesses, Wayles also worked as an agent for Farrell and Jones of Bristol, included performing debt collection. During the period leading up to the Revolutionary War, the tobacco economy was unstable and laws made the tobacco trade difficult for Wayles to conduct tobacco trade and collect debts. The economic and legal constraints led to the "bankruptcy of the Virginia plantation system". Jefferson began legal work for Wayles in 1768.

== Personal life ==
=== Marriages and children ===
On May 3, 1746, Wayles married Martha Eppes (born on April 10, 1721, at Bermuda Hundred), the daughter of Colonel Francis Epps. She was a young widow.

Their children were:

- Twins, a girl and a boy, who died within hours of their birth on December 23, 1746.
- Martha, born on October 31, 1748, (Note: Some sources state that Martha was born on October 19, 1748.) the couple's only child to survive to adulthood.

The infant's 27 year-old mother died five days later on November 5, 1748.

Secondly, Wayles married Tabitha Cocke, (Note: His wife's name is also given as Mary Cocke.) of Malvern Hill, also of the planter class. They had several children:

- Sarah, did not survive to adulthood.
- Elizabeth, born February 24, 1752; married Francis Eppes, the first cousin or nephew of John Wayles first wife, Martha Epps Wayles. Elizabeth and Francis Epps had two sons, Richard and John Wayles Eppes, the latter of whom married Thomas Jefferson's second daughter, Mary Jefferson.
- Tabitha, born November 16, 1753; married Robert Skipwith, and
- Anne, born August 26, 1756, married Henry Skipwith (born 1751), brother of her sister Tabitha's husband Robert.

Wayles's second wife died sometime between August 1756 and January 1760.

On January 26, 1760, Wayles married his third wife, Elizabeth Lomax Skelton (she was the widow of Reuben Skelton, an older brother of Bathurst Skelton, his daughter Martha's first husband). The couple had no issue; she died on February 10, 1761.

=== Betty Hemings and children ===
As part of the wedding settlement between John Wayles and Martha Epps, her parents gave the new couple an enslaved African-American woman and her young mixed-race daughter Betty Hemings, whose father was an English sea captain named Hemings. After the death of his third wife, Wayles began a relationship with 26 year-old Betty Hemings. (Note: Although there are factual sources showing that Wayles fathered children on slave Betty Hemings, author William G. Hyland, Jr. continued to deny it.) Betty already had four children: Mary, Martin, Betty Brown, and Nance.

Wayles fathered six children with Betty Hemings. Children that were the offspring of enslaved women and the slave owner were sometimes called "a shadow family":

- Robert (1762-1819)
- James (1765-1801)
- Thenia (1767-1796)
- Critta (1769-1850)
- Peter (1770-after 1834)
- Sally (1773-1835)

As their mother was enslaved, the children were all born into slavery under the principle of partus sequitur ventrum, which had been part of the law since 1662. They were three-quarters European in ancestry and half-siblings to Wayles's daughters by his wives.

Wayles was not known to acknowledge his children by Betty, nor did he free her or them in his will. To do so would have communicated his relationship with Betty and would have required a change in Virginia manumission laws at that time. He did, though, allow certain freedoms for his children. For instance his two oldest children were taught to read and write, allowed to earn their own money, and allowed to travel by themselves. The youngest boy, Peter, was three years old when Wayles died.

Hemings had two more children while she lived at Monticello named John and Lucy.

== Death and estate settlement ==
John Wayles died at age 58 in 1773. He left substantial property, including many slaves, but the estate was encumbered with debt. Upon Wayles's death, Betty Hemings and her six children with John Wayles were moved "without hesitancy" to Monticello to prevent the Hemingses from being separated.

The estate was worth £30,000, but Wayles was in debt to Farrell and Jones for £11,000. Wayles's three sons-in-law, including Thomas Jefferson, decided to break up the estate and its debts. Martha and her husband Thomas Jefferson inherited the Willis Creek and Elk Hill plantations and a total of 135 slaves, including members of the Hemings family. They also inherited £4,000 in debt. Jefferson and other co-executors of the Wayles estate worked for years to clear the debt.

== Sources ==
- Nash, Gary B.; Hodges, Graham R.G. (2008), Friends of Liberty: Thomas Jefferson, Tadeusz Kosciuszko, and Agrippa Hull. A Tale of Three Patriots, Two Revolutions, and A Tragic Betrayal Of Freedom In The New Nation, pp. 129–130, New York: Basic Books
