= Martha Jefferson =

First Lady of Virginia, wife of Thomas Jefferson (1748–1782)

First Lady of Virginia
- In role June 1, 1779 – June 3, 1781
- Governor: Thomas Jefferson
- Preceded by: Dorothea Henry
- Succeeded by: Anne Fleming

Personal details
- Born: Martha Skelton Wayles; October 30, 1748 [O.S. October 19, 1748] Charles City, Virginia, British America
- Died: September 6, 1782 (aged 33) Charlottesville, Virginia, U.S.
- Spouses: Bathurst Skelton (m. 1766; died 1768) Thomas Jefferson (m. 1772)
- Children: Seven, including Martha and Mary
- Parents: John Wayles (father); Martha Eppes (mother)

Martha Skelton Jefferson (née Wayles; October 30, 1748 [O.S. October 19, 1748] – September 6, 1782) was the wife of Thomas Jefferson from 1772 until her death in 1782. She served as First Lady of Virginia during Jefferson's term as governor from 1779 to 1781. She died in 1782, 19 years before he became president.

Of the six children born to Thomas and Martha, only two survived to adulthood, Martha and Mary. Martha died four months after the birth of her last child. The couple's letters to one another were burned, though by whom is unknown, and Thomas rarely spoke of her, so she remains a somewhat enigmatic figure. (Similarly, Jefferson did not speak much of his mother, Jane Randolph Jefferson.) (Note: See Jane Randolph Jefferson § Relationship with Thomas)

As a widower, Thomas had a long-standing relationship and children with Martha's half-sister, Sally Hemings, an enslaved woman who was three-quarters white by descent.

== Early life and education ==
Martha Wayles was born on October 30, 1748 (O.S. October 19, 1748), the only surviving child born to Martha Eppes Wayles (1721–1748) and John Wayles (1715–1773), near Colonial Williamsburg in Charles City County, Virginia.

Martha's mother, Martha Eppes Wayles, had previously given birth to twins in 1746, but neither survived; the girl was stillborn and the boy died hours after his birth. Martha was nicknamed "Patsy". Martha's father John was a Lancaster-born emigrant to the Thirteen Colonies who worked as an attorney and prosperous planter and slave trader. In addition, he was an agent for the Farrell and Jones company based in Bristol, undertaking activities such as debt collection on their behalf. Martha Eppes Wayles was a daughter of Francis Eppes, a settler of the Bermuda Hundred, an early Virginian colony established along the Appomattox River. While little is known of Martha Eppes Wayles' life, she had an appreciation for fine literature, such as her favorite novel, Tristram Shandy and Les Aventures de Télémaque. (Her rebound version of the book, The Adventures of Telemachus, contains her signature on the title page and resides at the Library of Congress).

Martha Wayles had two stepmothers, neither of whom lived long after their marriages to John Wayles, and through one stepmother she had four half-sisters. Wayles married Tabitha Cocke, (Note: His wife's name is also given as Mary Cocke.) of Malvern Hill. They had four children: Sarah, Elizabeth, Tabitha and Anne. Sarah died in infancy. Tabitha and Anne married the Skipwith brothers, Robert and Henry, respectively. Tabitha Skipwith died with her first childbirth. Nancy Skipwith, "Aunty Skipwith" to the Jefferson children and grandchildren, died in 1798. Elizabeth married Francis Eppes, Martha's cousin, and had two sons, Richard and John Wayles Eppes, the latter of whom married Thomas Jefferson's second daughter, Mary Jefferson. Wayles' second wife died most likely after the birth of Anne in August 1756 and before he married his third wife in January 1760.

On January 26, 1760, Wayles married his third wife, Elizabeth Lomax Skelton (she was the widow of Reuben Skelton, an older brother of Bathurst Skelton, his daughter Martha's first husband). Without producing a child with Wayles, she died on February 10, 1761. John Wayles then took Betty Hemings as a concubine, and gave Martha additional half-siblings. (Note: After the death of his third wife, Wayles took the then 26 year-old Betty Hemings as his mistress or concubine. (Note: Although there were sources that believed that Wayles fathered children with Betty Hemings, author William G. Hyland, Jr. did not believe that Wayles had Betty as a mistress.) Born into slavery, the children of this union were three-quarters European in ancestry and half-siblings to Martha and Elizabeth Wayles. The youngest was Sally Hemings, born in July 1773, two months after her father's death.) Martha likely received her education—including literature, dance, music, French language and Bible study— from private tutors or women in the family. She became the "Lady of the House" after her second stepmother died when she was 13 years of age and was often a hostess to John Wayles' social events and helped manage his business and household affairs. She knew how to make candles, soap, butter and remedies for illnesses.

== Marriages and children ==
Martha Wayles first married Bathurst Skelton (born 1744), an attorney, on November 20, 1766, at age 18. Their son, John, was born on November 7, 1767. Skelton died on September 30, 1768. Martha then moved back to The Forest following her husband's death. Three-year-old John died on June 10, 1771.

=== Thomas Jefferson ===
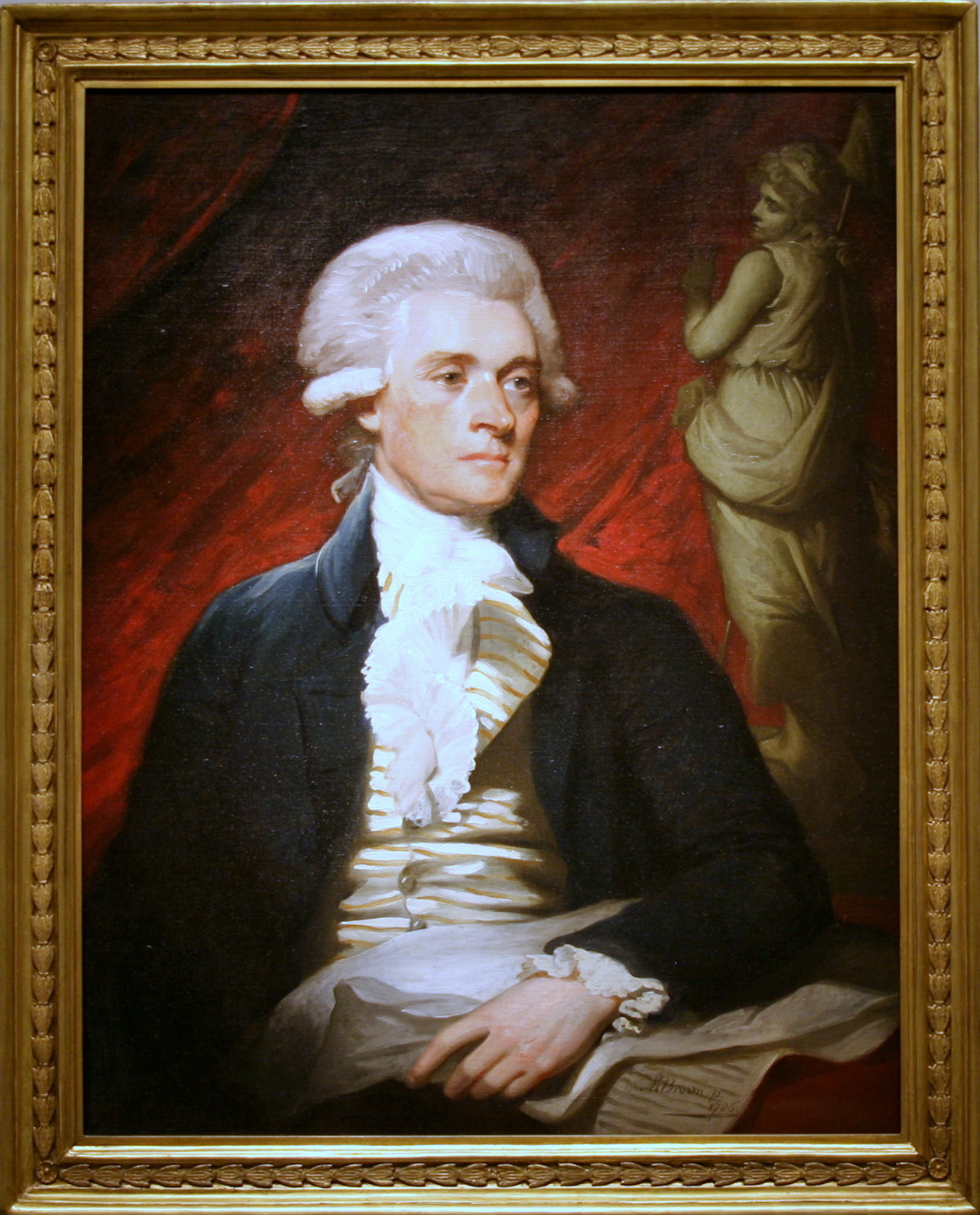
Mather Brown, Thomas Jefferson, 1786, oil painting, National Portrait Gallery

Thomas Jefferson likely began courting Martha in December 1770. They shared an interest in horse-back riding, literature, and music. As part of Martha's dowry for their January 1, 1772 wedding, Thomas and Martha received property, including the Elk Hill plantation, where Martha had lived with her first husband, and a great number of slaves, which helped Thomas complete the construction of the Monticello residence and landscaping of the estate's 5,000 acres. (Note: After the wedding, the couple left The Forest plantation for Monticello. A heavy snowfall began on the afternoon of their journey and produced two feet of snow. As a result, they had to forgo their carriage. Their horses were swapped for two fresh horses at Blenheim Estate of Jefferson's friend, Edward Carter. Martha and Thomas completed the remaining seven-mile leg of their journey of narrow paths. Thomas Jefferson described his outlook for the marriage: "In every schemings of happiness she is placed in the fore-ground of the picture, as the principal figure. Take that away, and it is not a picture for me.") While Monticello was undergoing construction and Thomas was away, Martha often stayed at the Elk Hill plantation.

They had six children, but only two daughters reached adulthood. An unnamed son, Jane Randolph, and Lucy Elizabeth, who died of whooping cough, died as infants. Only the eldest, Martha "Patsy" Jefferson, survived past the age of 25:

- Martha "Patsy" Jefferson (September 27, 1772 – October 10, 1836)
- Jane Randolph Jefferson (April 3, 1774 – September 1775)
- unnamed son (May 28 – June 14, 1777), lived for 17 days
- Mary "Maria or Polly" Jefferson (August 1, 1778 – April 17, 1804)
- Lucy Elizabeth Jefferson (November 3, 1780 – April 15, 1781)
- Lucy Elizabeth Jefferson (May 8, 1782 – c. October 13, 1784)

== Slaves and Wayles' estate ==
Martha and Thomas Jefferson acquired a number of slaves as part of her dowry for her marriage, and later from the estate of John Wayles, which made Thomas the second largest slave owner in Albemarle County. The dowry increased the number of slaves he owned from 52 to 187.

Among the more than 100 enslaved Black and Indigenous people were Betty Hemings, of mixed-race ancestry, and her 10 mixed-race children. The youngest, an infant, was Sally Hemings. The six youngest were three-quarters white in ancestry and half-siblings of Martha Wayles Jefferson, as they were fathered by her father. Betty also had four children born before those of Wayles'. All the Hemings family members gained privileged positions among the slaves at Monticello, where they were trained and worked as domestic servants, chefs, and highly skilled artisans. Sally Hemings, who was fathered by John Wayles, was the half-sister of Martha Wayles Jefferson, and the subject of a scandal about her relationship with Thomas Jefferson.

Martha's father, John Wayles, died at age 58 in 1773. He left substantial property, including slaves, but the estate was encumbered with debt. Upon Wayles' death, Betty Hemings and her six children with John Wayles were moved "without hesitancy" to Monticello to prevent the Hemings from being separated. The estate was worth £30,000, but was in debt to Farrell and Jones in Bristol for £11,000. Wayles three sons-in-law, including Thomas Jefferson, decided to break up the estate and its debts. Martha and her husband Thomas Jefferson inherited the Willis Creek and Elk Hill plantations and a total of 135 people, including members of the Hemings family. They also inherited £4,000 in debt. Jefferson and other co-executors of the Wayles estate worked for years to clear the debt and the overwhelming debt led to Thomas Jefferson's financial ruin.

== Contemporaneous descriptions ==
No contemporaneous portraits of Martha Jefferson survive, but she has been described by family members and Isaac Granger Jefferson as small, graceful, and pretty, and like her daughter, Mary Jefferson Eppes. She was described by Robert Skipwith, her sister's husband, as having possessed "the greatest fund of good nature ... that sprightliness and sensibility which promises to ensure you the greatest happiness mortals are capable of enjoying." As Thomas was having Monticello built, he obtained a piano forte from England for Martha as a wedding present. She played the harpsichord pianoforte, while Thomas Jefferson played violins. Martha reportedly played the harpsichord "very skillfully and who, is in all respects, a very agreeable sensible and accomplished lady," according to a Hessian officer, Jacob Rubsamen, who visited Monticello in 1780.

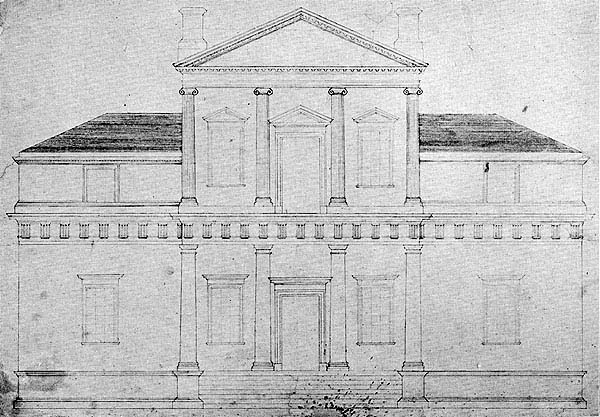
Original front elevation drawing of Monticello, 1771

According to her daughter, Martha Jefferson was highly educated and musical, a constant reader, with a good nature and a vivacious temper that sometimes bordered on tartness. She had great affection for her husband. She was a little over 5 feet (150 cm) tall, with a lithe figure, auburn hair, and hazel eyes. She was an accomplished needlewoman, some of her embroidery still exists. Martha maintained a collection of notes regarding her household duties and recipes, such as butchering and curing meat and the creation of large batches of soft and hard soap, candles, and beer. During her first year of marriage, she began the practice of brewing beer, producing 170 US gallons (640 L) that year.

== First lady of Virginia ==
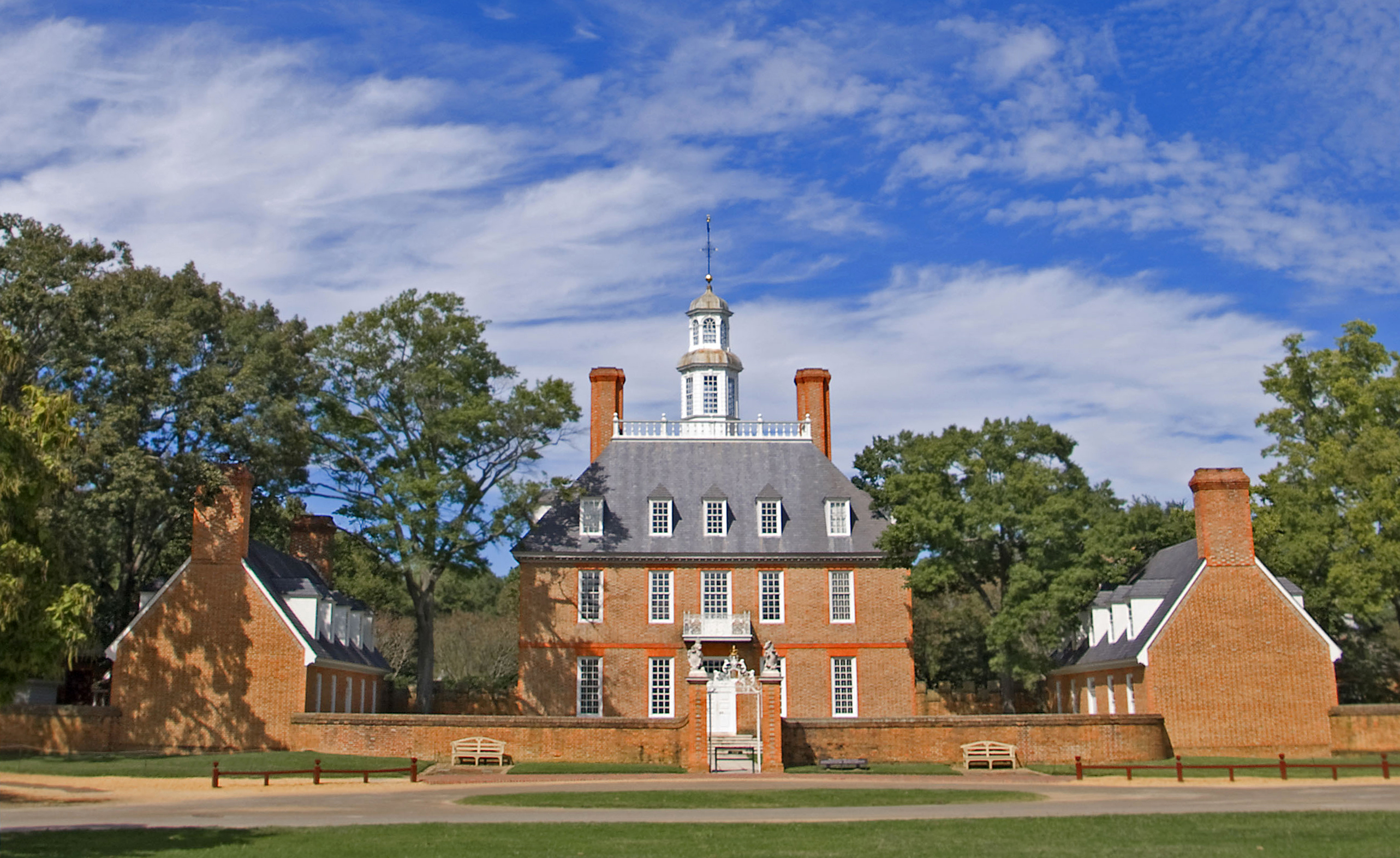
Governor's Palace, Governor Jefferson's residence in Williamsburg

Martha Jefferson was First Lady of Virginia from 1779 to 1781, during the American Revolution. In that capacity, and in response to a request from Martha Washington, Mrs. Jefferson led a drive among the women of Virginia to raise funds and supplies for her state's militia in the Continental Army to the extent that her health permitted. The letter to James Madison's mother, Eleanor Conway Madison, is the only letter written by Martha Jefferson known to now exist. She published an appeal in the Virginia Gazette, announcing that collections would be taken in the churches. Nationally, the Ladies Association raised $300,000 to buy linen shirts for Washington's army.

== Health problems ==
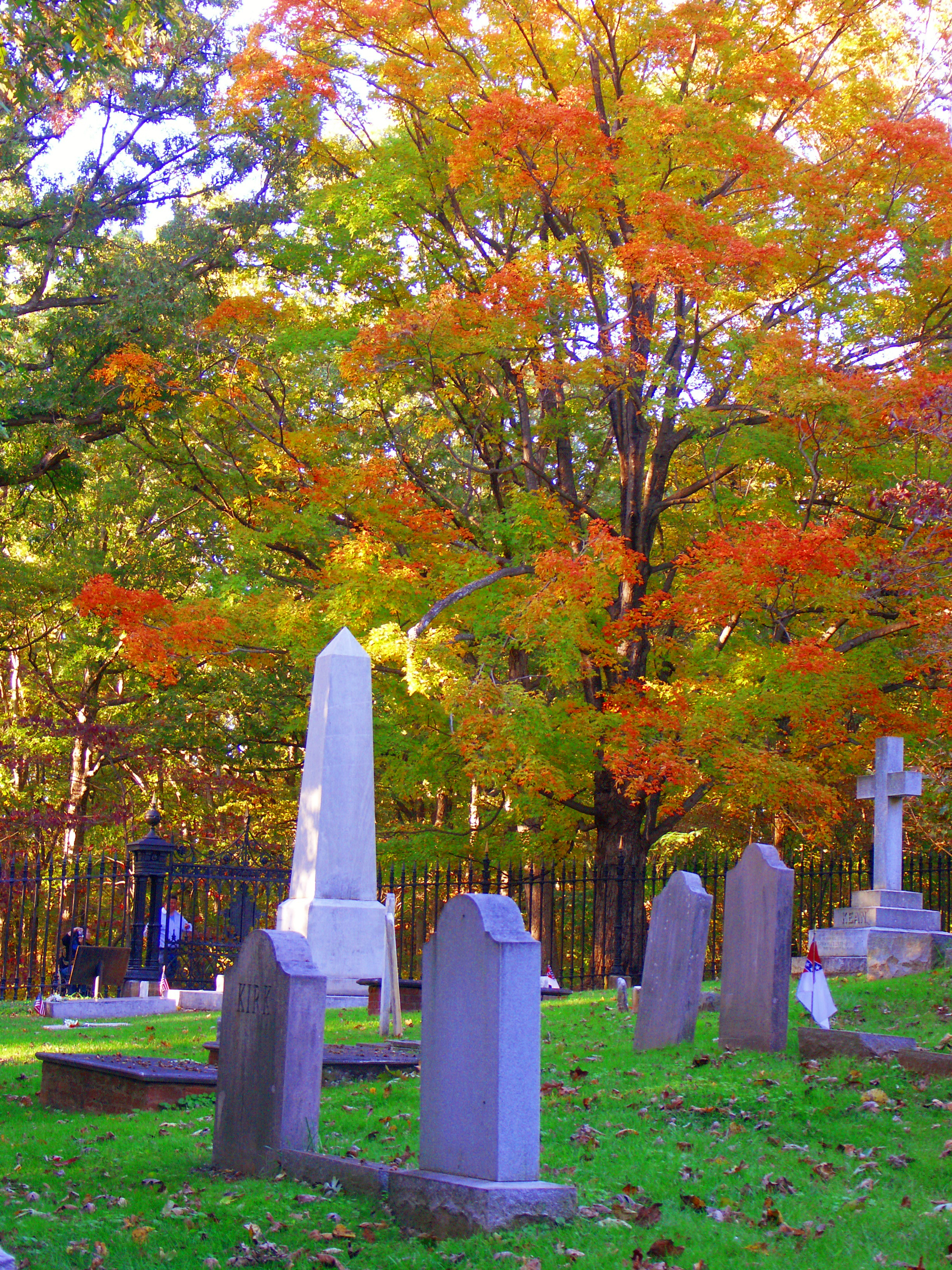
Monticello Family Graveyard, including Thomas Jefferson's gravesite

Managing the Jefferson household became increasingly difficult for Martha Jefferson, who had endured at least one case of smallpox, may have had diabetes, and was weakened by her numerous pregnancies, which would ultimately kill her. She fled Richmond ahead of advancing British forces in early January 1781, and also avoided a raid on Monticello in June of that year, being aware that the British were interested in capturing her or her husband. The baby, Lucy Elizabeth I, fell ill during the January evacuation and never recovered, dying in 1781 on April 15.

Thomas limited his political service due to her health. Jefferson was in Philadelphia for the Second Continental Congress in 1776, where he drafted the Declaration of Independence over a period of two weeks in June 1776. He wished to return to her as soon as possible. Thomas served as governor and in the House of Delegates in Virginia. He declined the offer to serve as the commissioner to France made by the Continental Congress while she was alive. (Note: He served as commissioner to France beginning in 1784. He took his eldest child, Patsy, with him and later sent for his second daughter, Polly.)

== Death ==
The birth of Lucy Elizabeth II, their youngest child, in May 1782 was reportedly the most difficult pregnancy for Mrs. Jefferson, since the infant was over 16 pounds at birth. (Note: Martha wrote the following from Tristram Shandy just before she died. Tristram Shandy Time wastes too fast: every letter I trace tells me with what rapidity life follows my pen. The days and hours of it are flying over our heads like clouds of windy day never to return– more. Every thing presses on– — Laurence Sterne On the same document, Thomas responded to these lines with "and every time I kiss thy hand to bid adieu, every absence which follows it, are preludes to that eternal separation which we are shortly to make!" It is the rare document that Thomas Jefferson did not destroy of his wife's handwriting. Thomas had written to Marquis de Chastellux of his state of suspense over the summer following the birth of Lucy Elizabeth.) Edmund Randolph wrote in the month of her death that Thomas was "inconsolable" about Martha's declining health and pain."

Mrs. Jefferson's health worsened and she died on September 6, 1782, four months after the birth of her last child. (Note: At his wife's death, Thomas "was led from the room almost in a state of insensibility by his sister Mrs. Carr, who, with great difficulty, got him into his library where he fainted, and remained so long insensible that they feared he would never revive." After the funeral, he withdrew to his room for three weeks. Afterward, he spent hours riding horseback alone around Monticello. His daughter Martha Jefferson Randolph wrote, "In those melancholy rambles I was his constant companion, a solitary witness to many a violent burst of grief." Not until mid-October did Jefferson begin to resume a normal life when he wrote, "emerging from that stupor of mind which had rendered me as dead to the world as was she whose loss occasioned it.")

She was buried at Monticello under a tombstone bearing the inscription written by Thomas:

To the memory of
Martha Jefferson,
Daughter of John Wayles;
Born October 19th, 1748, O.S.
Intermarried with
Thomas Jefferson
January 1st, 1772;
Torn from him by death
September 6th, 1782:
This monument of his love is inscribed.

Below the inscription, Jefferson added a quotation in Greek from the Iliad, which may be translated as:

And even if in the house of Hades men forget their dead, yet will I even there remember my dear comrade.

So that her children would not grow up with stepmothers, Martha had asked Thomas Jefferson to never marry again, and he never did. Her request has been attributed to her own unhappy relationships with her stepmothers. At her death, she was 33; he was 39.

== Legacy ==
Martha Jefferson was portrayed by Betty Buckley in the 1969 Broadway musical 1776, and by Blythe Danner in the 1972 film adaptation.
