= Catharine Flood McCall =

Virginia businesswoman (1766–1828)

Catherine Flood McCall
- Born: 1766; Essex County, Colony of Virginia
- Died: March 9, 1828 (aged 61–62); Georgetown, Virginia, United States
- Known for: 19-century businesswoman, heiress, plantation owner, and slaveholder
- Parent(s): Archibald McCall (father), Katharine Flood McCall (mother)
- Relatives: Elizabeth (Betsy) McCall

Catharine Flood McCall (1766–March 9, 1828) was an early 19th-century American businesswoman. Before and during the American Revolutionary War, she was educated in Scotland and London. She inherited Cedar Grove and Clydeside plantations following the death of her maternal grandfather, Nicholas Flood in 1776. Parliament passed a law that prevented people from traveling to the Thirteen British Colonies during the war. McCall and her father were unable to return to Virginia until 1782. She was among the owners of the most slaves in Essex County, Virginia, and received an inheritance from her maternal grandfather of the Cedar Grove and Clydeside plantations.

Beginning in 1798, she owned blacksmith shops and nail factories in Alexandria and Richmond, Virginia, during a period of growth in Virginia when there was a demand for nails to build wooden houses and buildings. Her business competed against Thomas Jefferson's and the Virginia State Penitentiary's blacksmith and nailery businesses. After the penitentiary had understood McCall's nailery, she sold the business in 1815 to William Stewart, Jr. who died with outstanding debts. McCall was sued for his debts, claiming that McCall had not properly sold the business to Stewart. McCall lived in Georgetown in the District of Columbia in her later years.

== Early life ==
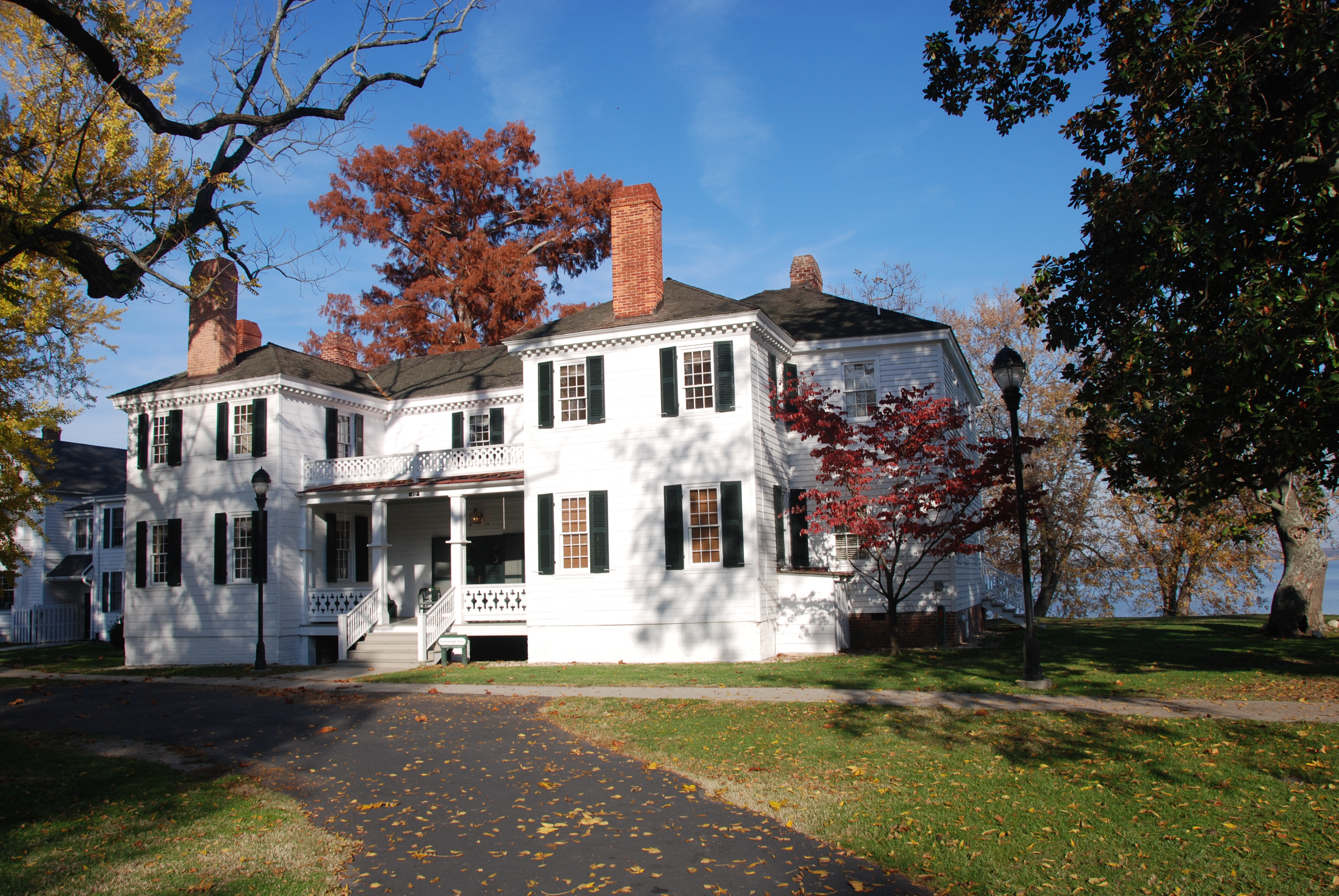
Brockenbrough House also known as the McCall-Brockenbrough House, Tappahannock, Virginia was built by her father Archibald McCall

Catharine (Kate, Kattey, Kitty) Flood McCall was born on December 25, 1766, in Tappahannock, Essex County, Virginia. Her mother, Katharine Flood McCall, died on January 5, 1767, due to complications of childbirth. Her father Archibald McCall was a merchant and landowner, who lived on a plantation near Tappahannock. She had an older sister Elizabeth (Betsy).

In 1773, Catharine age 6 and Elizabeth age 8, were sent by their father to Glasgow to be educated. The girls were educated in Edinburgh, Scotland and London, England boarding schools. Archibald McCall had intended to go with them, but it took longer than he expected to get his business affairs in order. The American Revolutionary War began on April 19, 1775, and McCall sailed to Great Britain that September. (Note: The Virginia Magazine said that the battle began on April 18, 1775.) Parliament enacted a law that prevented people from freely traveling from Britain to the American colonies during the war.

McCall was heiress to the estate of her maternal grandfather Dr. Nicholas Flood, who died by May 6, 1776, when an inventory was taken of his estate. Flood was a successful planter and a physician. He and his wife, Elizabeth Peachey Floor (1721–1792) had only one child, Katharine who died in 1767. McCall was the sole heir to Flood's estate, which included the Clydeside plantation in Essex County and Cedar Grove plantation in Richmond County. She later sold Cedar Grove and kept Clydeside.

In May 1777, Archibald brought his daughters to London to further their education. Betsy became sick with a fever in November and died on December 15, 1777, in London.

While they were in Scotland, McCall's estate was confiscated by authorities in Virginia. Elizabeth Flood, McCalls's maternal grandmother, fought to regain the property for her. Flood asked that Archibald be allowed to return to the estate and manage it until McCall came of age. That petition was denied. In 1778, her father had petitioned for passports for himself and McCall in London. He also tried through George McCall to get passports for them to Philadelphia or New York on a ship and then down to Virginia. Archibald was concerned about having her travel on a merchant ship across the Atlantic Ocean and for her safety around soldiers. He was also concerned about being unable to care for their property during the war. Archibald established a business in London with a partner, but the partner died, leaving a large debt to his partner's heirs.

In 1782, McCall and her father were allowed to return to Virginia. When she was 16, her father chartered the first ship that left London for America after the end of the war. In the winter of 1785–1786, a relative, Robert Hunter, and his friend Joseph Hadwell stayed with the McCalls. Both men sought to court McCall, but she rejected both of them. (Note: Hunter kept a diary of his trip to America, in which he described the McCall's home life.)

== Career ==
McCall was well-educated and an intelligent conversationalist. She was a wealthy single woman and the largest female slaveholder and the ninth-largest slaveholder in Essex County between 1800 and 1820. She owned 29 enslaved workers and generated income by hiring out some of her bondsmen.

In 1798, she founded a blacksmith shop and nail factory in Alexandria. She opened another factory in Richmond in 1806. It was called McCall's Basin on the Edge of the Canal. She made key decisions for the businesses with her father's guidance. McCall had managers who coordinated the daily operations.

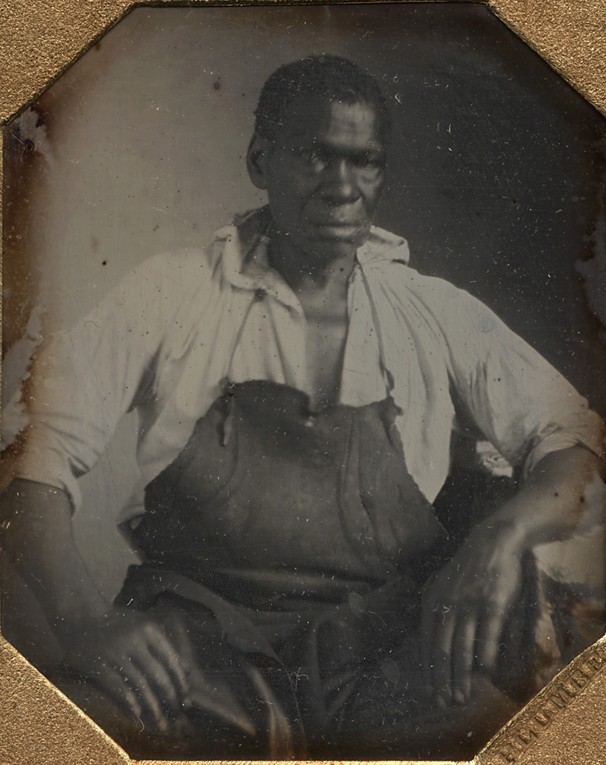
Isaac Jefferson, 1847, was an enslaved blacksmith at Monticello. See Thomas Jefferson and slavery § Monticello slave life

Her competitors were Thomas Jefferson and an enterprise that relied on prisoners at the Virginia State Penitentiary, which was less than a mile from McCall's Alexandria factory. She relied on enslaved and free laborers to staff the business. As Virginia's cities grew during the early 19th century, nails were needed to build wooden buildings. McCall's nail factory produced nail rod, bar iron, wrought nails, cut nails, and brads. The Penitentiary became profitable in 1807 from prisoner-made nails and other products. By 1815, it undercut McCall's and Jefferson's businesses, both of which ultimately closed down.

In January 1815, McCall transferred control of the business to William Stewart, Jr., who had managed the Alexandria businesses beginning November 1800. He was responsible for the work of enslaved laborers as well as purchasing, order processing, and bookkeeping. He then ran the business with John Creighton, until he was forced out of the business due to personal debt. He sold his share of the business to Creighton and William Gilham. His health declined due to emotional depression and illness and he died in February 1819, with outstanding debts. His creditors took the stance that McCall was liable for the debts because she did not legally sell the business to Stewart.

The Circuit Court of the District of Columbia for Alexandria County heard a chancery suit entitled Administrator of William Stewart, Jr. v. Catherine Flood McCall and others. The purpose of the suit was to prove that McCall's father was involved in business financial decisions. Letters between Stewart and McCall were used as evidence of their business practices.

It was very rare at the time for women to run industrial businesses, as McCall did. In the suit, McCall was identified as the owner of the business.

== Personal life and death ==
McCall and her father had residences in Tappahannock and Richmond. Archibald died in 1814.

McCall, who never married, moved to Georgetown in her later years. In 1821, Robert Hunter contacted her and asked her to marry him. By that time, he was a widower with married children. She declined. McCall died in Georgetown on March 9, 1828. After her death, Judge Walter Jones, a cousin from Washington, D.C., inherited her Clydeside estate.

== Legacy ==
She is one of a few of American women—like Martha Washington and Annie Henry Christian—who oversaw significant business operations that relied on slave labor in the late 1700s and early 1800s.

== Bibliography ==
- McCall, Archibald; McCall, George; Ewing, Joseph S. (1965). "The Correspondence of Archibald McCall and George McCall, 1777-1783". The Virginia Magazine of History and Biography. 73 (3): 312–353. ISSN 0042-6636. JSTOR 4247133.
