= Ursula Granger =

Enslaved cook of Thomas Jefferson (1738–1800)

- Born: c. 1738
- Died: 1800 (aged 61–62); Charlottesville, Virginia, U.S.
- Known for: Enslaved cook and household staff of Thomas Jefferson
- Spouse: George Granger Sr.
- Children: George Granger Jr. Bagwell Granger; Archy Granger; Isaac Granger

Ursula Granger (c. 1738 – 1800) was a woman enslaved by president of the United States Thomas Jefferson for over 27 years, who described her as a person who "unites trust & skill." She worked as a cook, dairymaid, laundress, and wet nurse, and has been referred to as the "Queen of Monticello" and as a pioneer of Black cidermaking in America.

== Life ==
Granger was born around 1738. In January 1773, she was purchased in a bidding war and enslaved by Thomas Jefferson, and she became a highly trusted domestic servant within Jefferson's household. Martha Jefferson had specifically written that she was "very desirious to get a favorite house woman of the name Ursula." Granger was purchased along with her sons and, later, her husband, George Granger Sr. Her husband became referred to as "Great George," and was a farm foreman and Monticello's only African American overseer.

Granger is frequently mentioned in the papers of Thomas Jefferson. She served as a pastry cook (later head cook for a period) and laundress, with duties including meat processing and preservation and supervising the bottling of cider at Monticello. Granger was also the wet nurse for Jefferson's eldest daughter, Martha Jefferson Randolph, who later served as the Acting First Lady of the United States. After Jefferson was elected Governor of Virginia in 1779, he took Granger and her family with him to Williamsburg and Richmond when he was elected governor.

== Death and descendants ==
Granger fell ill in late 1799 and died in the spring of 1800, aged 61 or 62. Granger, her husband, and her son George Granger Jr. all died within months of each other in 1799 and 1800.

Granger's youngest son, Isaac, using the surname Jefferson, survived into the 1840s as a free man in Petersburg, Virginia, and his recollections of life at Monticello were recorded. Her granddaughter, Ursula Granger Hughes, was named after her and briefly served as an enslaved White House chef when Jefferson became president. The last surviving recorded interview of a person enslaved by Thomas Jefferson was in 1949 with Fountain Hughes, a descendant of Granger.

== Legacy ==
The excavated and restored first kitchen of Monticello, referred to as the "Granger/Hemings Kitchen," is exhibited with details about the life of Ursula Granger, Sally Hemings, and "other enslaved cooks and chefs who helped create early American cuisine."

== See also ==
- Thomas Jefferson and slavery
- List of slaves
