= Kelloside =

- Location within Scotland
- 55°23′3.92″N 4°0′31.69″W
- Location: Kirkconnel parish, Dumfries and Galloway, Dumfriesshire, Scotland

History
- Built: 1870 or 1876

Listed Building – Category C(S)
- Official name: Historic Scotland
- Designated: 26 June 1986
- Reference no.: NS 72835 11887
- Historic Scotland Designation Reference: LB10278

Kelloside is a historic place south of Kirkconnel parish and the River Nith in Dumfries and Galloway, Dumfriesshire, Scotland. Old Kelloside is located along the Kello Water, which joins the Nith a mile (1.5 km) to the east.

It was designated a Historic Environment Scotland property in 1986. It is a large two-story farmhouse built in 1870 or 1876, likely incorporating an earlier house. It is a L-shaped building.

It was the birthplace of Archibald McCall (1734–1814), whose family had lived on the land for generations. His father, Samuel McCall, was a merchant who operated between Glasgow and Colonial Virginia.

It is described as:

Stugged and snecked ashlar. Hood-moulded windows with lying-panes and stop-chamfered reveals; gabled 1st floor dormer heads. West elevation: ground floor bipartite and single 1st floor/window to outer bays, gabled left bay boldly advanced; square, steep-gabled, narrow, full-height inner bay in re-entrant angle, with single windows, round-headed door facing south. Sawtooth skews with shaped skewputts; corniced stacks over north and south gables, other gables finialed. Roofed with graded slates.

— Historic Environment Scotland
