= St. Margaret's School (Virginia) =

Location
- 444 Water Lane, PO Box 158; Tappahannock, Virginia 22560; United States; 37°55′35.5″N 76°51′21.9″W

Information
- Type: Private school Religious school Boarding school
- Motto: "As we grow in age, may we grow in grace."
- Religious affiliation: Episcopal
- Established: 1921
- Head of school: Colley W. Bell III
- Faculty: 17.9 FTE
- Grades: 8-12
- Enrollment: 107
- Schedule type: Semesters
- Campus size: 4-5 acres + 40 acres athletic fields
- Campus type: All Girls Boarding/Day School
- Colors: Blue and Grey
- Athletics conference: L.I.S.
- Mascot: Scottie Dog
- Affiliation: VAIS
- Website: http://www.sms.org

St. Margaret's School was an independent, Episcopal, all-girls school located in the town of Tappahannock, Virginia, United States, on the banks of the Rappahannock River. The school is 45 miles northeast of the Richmond metro area, 100 miles southeast of the Washington metro area, and 75 miles northwest of the Hampton Roads metro area. St. Margaret's is governed by the Episcopal Diocese of Virginia. St. Margaret's opened in 1921 with 14 students and now has an enrollment of 98 girls. The student body includes international students from 18 different countries, and domestic boarding students from 17 states and Washington, D.C. Day students make up 20 percent of the student body. The school announced on July 10, 2025 that it would be shutting down immediately bringing an end to the school's 104 year history.

== The river ==
The Rappahannock River is studied thematically throughout the St. Margaret's School experience. The river is brought into the academic, social, and athletic programs across and beyond the curriculum. Each year the entire school takes time in September to celebrate the river during River Days. Each grade level takes a trip to a different part of the Rappahannock River to see how the river changes during different parts of its journey. The eighth grade travels to the headwaters in the Blue Ridge Mountains, freshmen go to Fredericksburg above the fall line, sophomores stay in Tappahannock, juniors go to the Chesapeake Bay, and seniors see the ocean at Virginia Beach. Other annual river-themed activities circulate throughout the school year include kayaking and swimming in the river, raising oysters in Ecology class, art projects, the Parent Council Rubber Duck Derby, and the commencement ceremony on the back lawn overlooking the river.

== Buildings on the campus ==
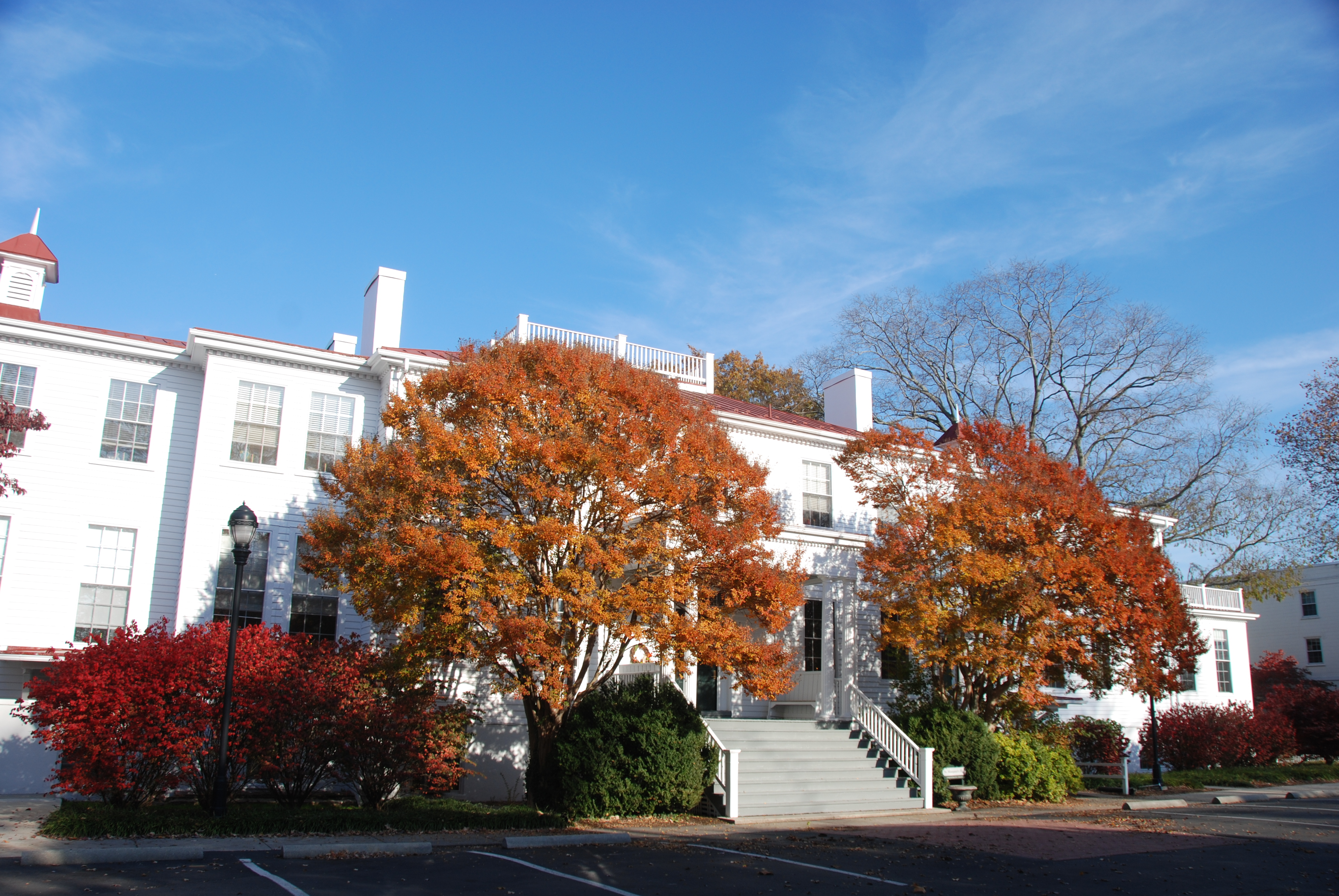
St. Margaret's Hall in November 2007

- St. Margaret's Hall - St. Margaret's Hall is the main building on campus, built in the 1840s and expanded in the 1920s, 1940s, and 1970s. This building houses offices, classrooms, the Chapel, and the art and music center.
  - Head of School's Office - The Head of School's Office is located in St. Margaret's Hall.
  - Chapel - The Chapel is located in St. Margaret's Hall. Episcopalian services are held here on Monday and Wednesday mornings and Sunday evenings. St. Margaret's School is governed by the Dioceses of Church Schools.
  - Pollard Art Center - The art center is located in the right wing of St. Margaret's Hall and is home to 14 different art programs offered by the school. A pottery studio and photography lab are also available.
  - Gruver Music Center - The music center is located in the left wing of St. Margaret's Hall. This center features a large classroom as well as practice rooms. Theater performances are held in the Ball Memorial Gymnasium which features a dance studio and costume room.

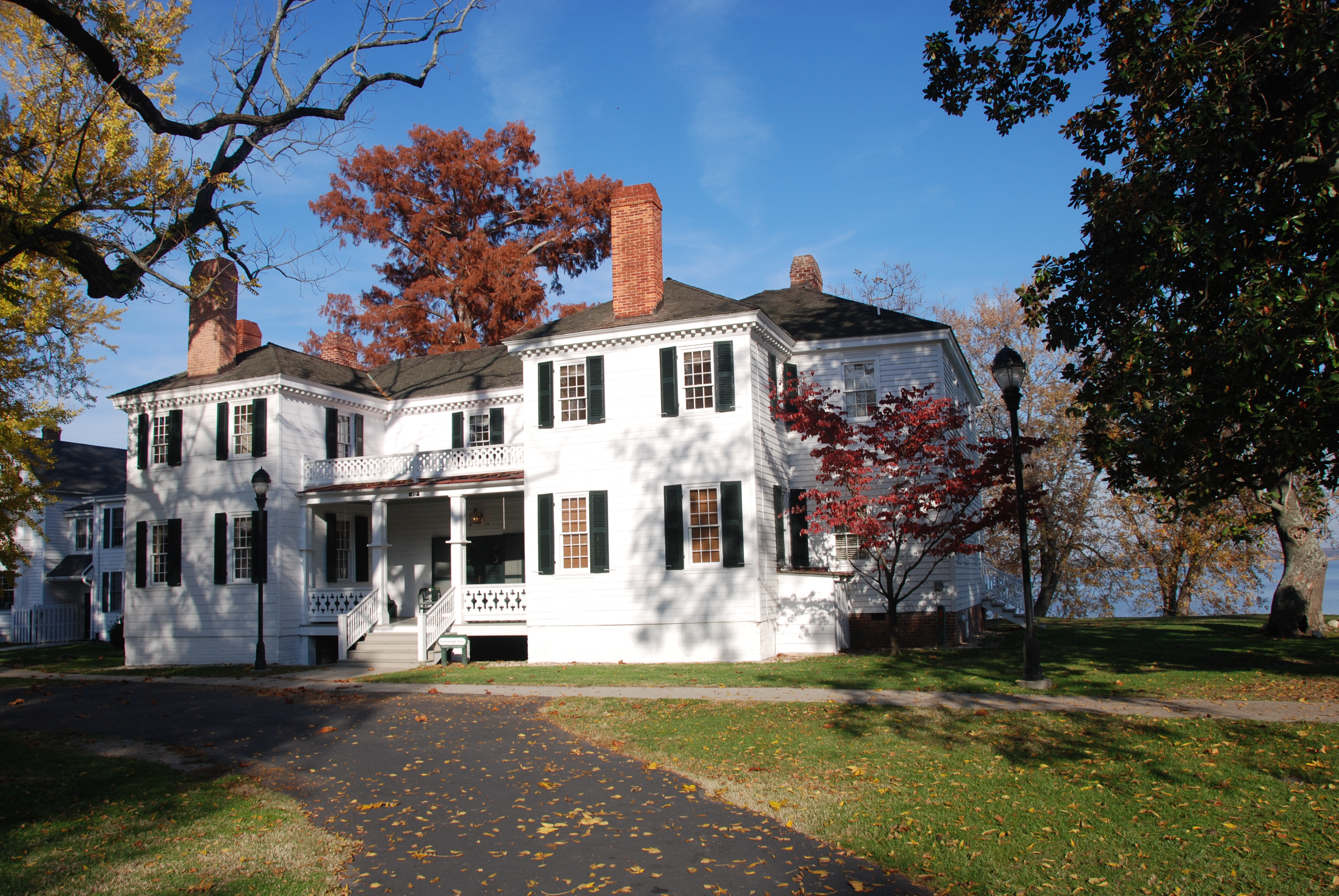
Brockenbrough House also known as the McCall-Brockenbrough House, Tappahannock, Virginia

- Brockenbrough House - The Head of School lives in the Brockenbrough House, also known as "B House." This historical building was built in 1763 for local merchant Archibald McCall. In 1812, a mantel in the drawing room was damaged by shelling from a British gunboat; it has been repaired and is still in use in the room. The house was extensively restored in 2005.
- McCuan House - This dorm offers suite-style rooms and was built in 2005. It is named after Patrick and Jill McCuan, who donated the funds for the dormitory after their daughter, Megan, graduated. They were motivated by appreciation for the change they saw in their daughter during her years at St. Margaret's.
- Anderton House - Built in 1760 by plantation owner Robert Coleman, Anderton House is better known as "A House." It features waterfront views and traditional dorm layouts. It is equipped with single and double rooms and girls share hall style bathrooms. While the northern and southern wings were added much later, the building still retains original weatherboarding, windows, and chimneys.
- The Cottage - The Cottage, built in the 1930s, originally served as a campus dorm. The building now contains classrooms and a computer lab.
- Latané Hall - Built in 1955 and renovated in 2002, Latané Hall is the largest dorm on the campus. The building is named after former Headmistress Edith Latane. It includes an exercise room, study rooms, and single and double rooms.
- Woolfolk Center - The Library, College Counseling, and the Office of the Director of Studies are all located in the Viola H. Woolfolk Center. Built in 1991 the Woolfolk center is the named after former Headmistress Viola Woolfolk.
- Community/Technology Center - The Margaret Robinson Broad Dining Room is located on the first floor of the Community Technology Center. The building, built in 1999, overlooks the Rappahannock River. The basement of the Community Technology Center holds science and mathematics classrooms and laboratories.
- Athletic Complex - The Ball Memorial Gymnasium, fitness center, Gilchrist Field, recreational swimming pool, tennis courts, and river access are all available on campus. One mile from campus is the 42 acre athletic complex. This area contains a cross country trail, two soccer fields, two softball fields, and river access through Hoskins Creek. St. Margaret's also utilizes facilities including a golf course and regulation swimming pool in the greater community.
- River Lawn - St. Margaret's School sits on the banks of the Rappahannock River. This mile wide water way flows into the Chesapeake Bay and provides the St. Margaret's community with learning opportunities and a setting for many of the school traditions.

== Athletics ==
All students participate in sports all three seasons on varsity or junior varsity athletic teams.

Fall: Tennis, Field Hockey, Volleyball, Crew Winter: Basketball, Swimming, Crew Spring: Soccer, Softball, Crew

The after-school physical education program educates students on the rules and skills associated with the sports offered at St. Margaret's School. To promote sportsmanship, school spirit, and teamwork, every student is a member of the Blue or Grey intramural team; throughout the year, these teams compete in both academic and athletic contests. Our goal for afternoon activities at St. Margaret’s is for girls to enjoy being active and support them in reaching their goals. All Students participate on an athletic team for all three seasons.

St. Margaret's is a member of the League of Independent Schools which includes ten other independent schools. There are 22 coaches, all of whom have completed the NFHS Fundamentals of Coaching course and are certified in Heartsaver First Aid by the American Heart Association.

== Arts ==
St. Margaret's Fine Arts program offers students the opportunity to participate in Music, Art, and Drama, and incorporates these opportunities into various facets of the school program: visual and performing arts classes, after-school activities, individual instruction, and student organizations.
