= Archibald McCall (1734–1814) =

- Born: April 28, 1734; Kelloside in Kirkconnel parish, Dumfries and Galloway, Scotland
- Died: October 9, 1814 (aged 80); Virginia
- Occupation: Merchant
- Years active: 1754–1814
- Spouse: Katherine Flood
- Parent: Samuel McCall

Archibald McCall (April 28, 1734 – October 9, 1814) was a Scottish-born merchant and landowner. Born in Dumfries and Galloway, he settled in the British colony of Virginia in the 1750s. A supporter of the Stamp Act 1765, he required customers to pay the tax associated with the Act, and was tarred and feathered by a mob for his position. Although he was considered a Loyalist, he signed the Virginia Nonimportation Resolutions of 1770 along with Thomas Jefferson, George Washington, and other patriots. There is evidence that he supplied Lord Dunmore's troops with food before he left for Britain in 1775. He stayed in Britain longer than he expected, because he could not get permission to return to Virginia.

== Early life ==
Archibald McCall was born on April 28, 1734, at Kelloside in Kirkconnel parish, Dumfries and Galloway, Scotland. His father, a merchant from Glasgow, Samuel McCall, owned property in Colonial Maryland, Virginia, and other places. The land in Virginia that he called New Glasgow was located along the Piscataway Creek. Samuel owned a trading vessel Betty; William Dunlop was its master. It carried goods between Glasgow and Tappahannock, Virginia. Archibald had an older brother, George, who was a merchant in Fredericksburg, Virginia, but he returned to Scotland after a few years.

== Career (1754–1775) ==
In 1754, McCall immigrated to Essex County, Virginia, with his brother James, who returned to Glasgow in 1757. McCall then established himself as a merchant in Tappahannock, Virginia, which was called Hobbs Hole at the time. His father died in 1759. In the late 1760s, McCall had a number of establishments: a cooper's shop, flour mill, a bakehouse, and vessels. He had two plantations; the 502-acre property had the mill. Clydeside Plantation was located along Piscataway Creek. His granary was on a tributary of Hoskins Creek. He was also an agent in Virginia for his family's interests.

== Events leading up to the war ==
During the Stamp Act 1765 crisis, McCall sided against patriots in Westmoreland and Essex County, Virginia. McCall insisted on collecting the tax that was placed on stamps and other documents. In reaction, a mob formed and stormed his house. They threw rocks through the windows. McCall was tarred and feathered by an angry mob. In 1770, he sided with the patriots and signed the Virginia Nonimportation Resolutions along with Thomas Jefferson, George Washington, and others.

== American Revolutionary War ==
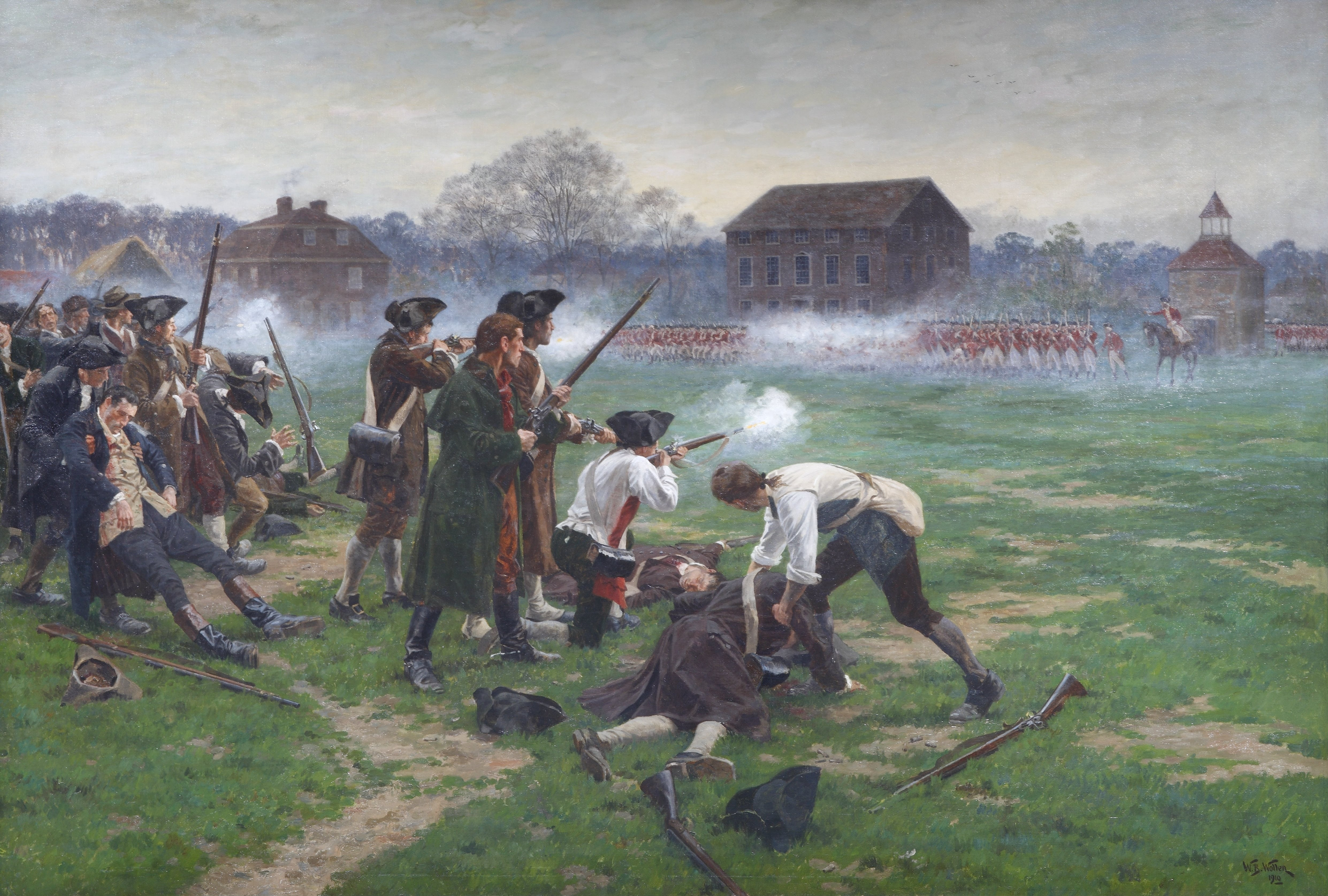
William Barnes Wollen, The Battle of Lexington, Lexington Battle Green, April 19, 1775.

The American Revolutionary War began on April 19, 1775 (with the shot heard round the world of the Battles of Lexington and Concord). (Note: The Virginia Magazine said that the battle began on April 18, 1775.) McCall was suspected of supplying Virginia's royal governor Lord Dunmore's troops with food. He was exonerated of the charge that he joined Lord Dunmore by the Essex Committee of Safety in 1775.

McCall sailed to Britain in September 1775, with the intention of visiting with his daughters who went to Scotland in 1773. He thought that the war would not last longer than six months and left his business affairs in the hands of William Shedden and his cousin George McCall. All of it was left to George, though, after Shedden was determined to be a Loyalist and was ordered out of the country by the Essex Court on January 30, 1777. Parliament enacted a law that prevented people from freely traveling from Britain to the Thirteen Colonies. McCall remained in Britain during the war because he could not get permission to return to Virginia. In that time, one of his daughters died of a fever in London on December 15, 1777. Not being able to return to Virginia presented risks to his business interests and the inheritance his daughter Catharine Flood McCall was to receive upon the death of her maternal grandfather Dr. Flood. To support himself and Catharine, he and a partner founded an underwriting business in London. His partner died, leaving him indebted to the partner's heirs. He put up his estate in Virginia as security.

In 1783, he petitioned to return to Virginia, in which he stated that he had sent his daughters to Glasgow to receive a proper education near his relatives and as the result of a disagreement with his father-in-law. He chartered the first ship that left from London for America after the end of the war. McCall then began to reclaim his estate, beginning with his house in Tappahannock. In the winter of 1785–1786, a relative, Robert Hunter and his friend Joseph Hadwell, stayed with the McCalls and both sought to court Catharine, but she rejected both men.

== Personal life ==
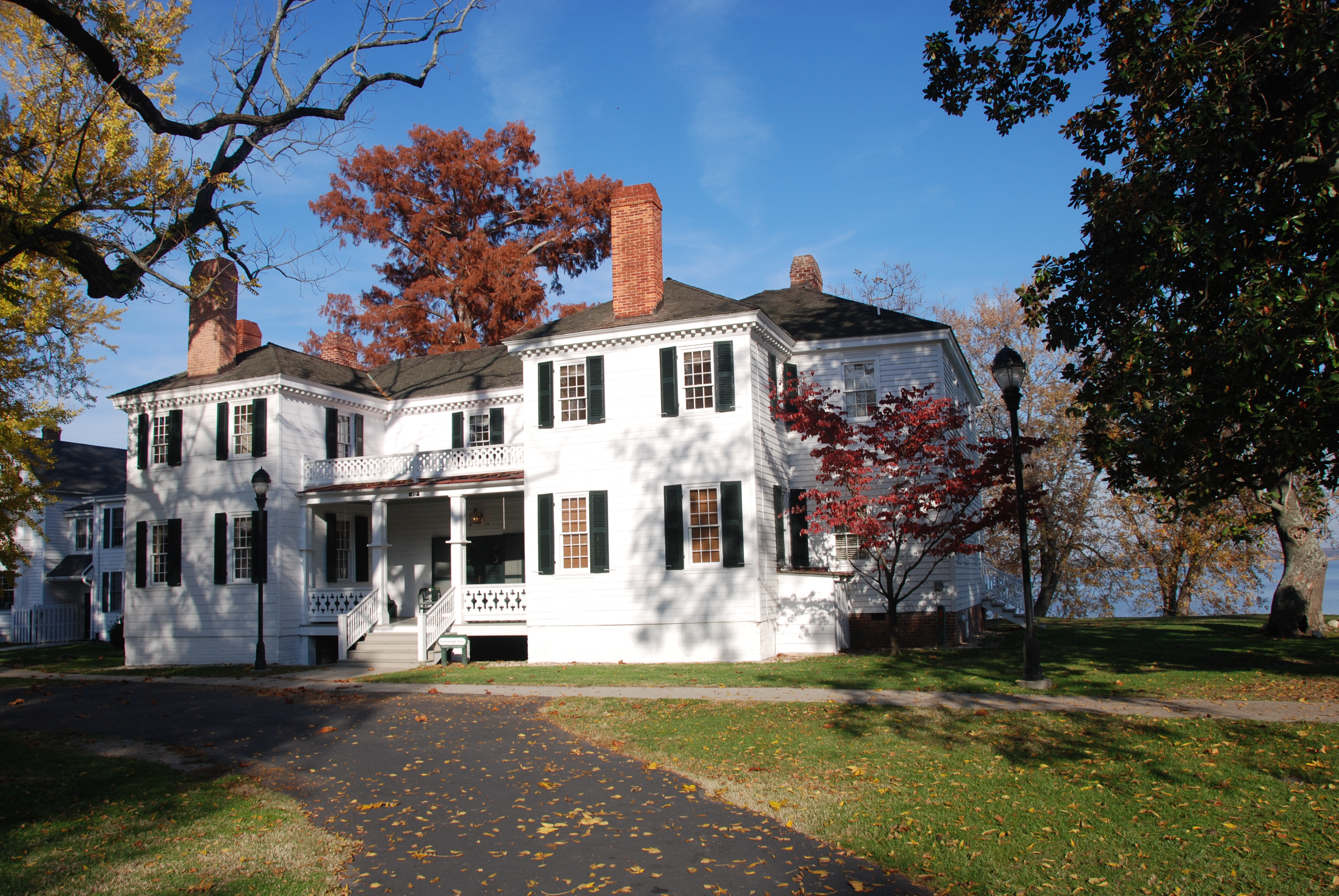
Brockenbrough House also known as the McCall-Brockenbrough House, Tappahannock, Virginia. The house is now part of St. Margaret's School

McCall married Katherine Flood, the daughter of Nicholas Flood, a wealthy planter and physician, and Elizabeth Peachey Flood. The Floods lived three miles from Farnham, Virginia, on the Cedar Grove estate. In 1763, McCall purchased land along the Rappahannock River in Tappahannock and built a house there, known as Brockenbrough House or Brockenbrough-McCall House. William Buckland was the architect and master builder for the house.

Katherine gave birth to Catharine Flood McCall on December 25, 1766, and died in January 1767 due to complications of the birth. She is buried at Farnham Church in Richmond County, Virginia. Their two daughters, Catharine age 6 and Elizabeth age 8, were sent in 1773 to Britain to be educated. He had intended to go with them, but it took longer than he expected to get his business affairs in order.

== Later years and death ==
In 1789, McCall established deeds of trust for much of his property in Essex County. Much of his property in Essex County, including the Brockenbrough House, went to the heirs of his business partner in London, who in 1813 sold the property to Dr. Austin Brockenbrough. At that time, McCall and his daughter Catharine lived in Richmond, Virginia. McCall died on October 9, 1814. Catharine inherited two plantations.

His obituary in the November 2, 1814, edition of the Virginia Argus stated:

Mr. McCall was distinguished for the sagacity of his mind, and the cheerfulness of his manners which diffused a charm around him. He has left a most affectionate daughter and a numerous circle of acquaintances to lament his death.

== Bibliography ==
- McCall, Archibald; McCall, George; Ewing, Joseph S. (1965). "The Correspondence of Archibald McCall and George McCall, 1777-1783". The Virginia Magazine of History and Biography. 73 (3): 312–353. ISSN 0042-6636. JSTOR 4247133.
