= Thomas Jefferson and Native Americans =

Thomas Jefferson believed Native American peoples to be a noble race who were "in body and mind equal to the whiteman" and were endowed with an innate moral sense and a marked capacity for reason. Nevertheless, he believed that Native Americans were culturally and technologically inferior. Like many contemporaries, he believed that Indian lands should be taken over by white people and made the taking of tribal lands a priority, with a four step plan to "(1) run the hunters into debt, then threaten to cut off their supplies unless the debts are paid out of the proceeds of a land cession; (2) bribe influential chiefs with money and private reservations; (3) select and invite friendly leaders to Washington to visit and negotiate with the President, after being overawed by the evident power of the United States; and (4) threaten trade embargo or war."

Before and during his presidency, Jefferson discussed the need for respect, brotherhood, and trade with the Native Americans, and he initially believed that forcing them to adopt European-style agriculture and modes of living would allow them to quickly "progress" from "savagery" to "civilization". Beginning in 1803, Jefferson's private letters show increasing support for the idea of removal, and he suggested various ideas for removing tribes from enclaves in the East to their own new lands in lands west of the Mississippi River. Jefferson maintained that Indians had land "to spare" and, he thought, would willingly exchange it for guaranteed supplies of food and equipment. Starting in 1808, Jefferson initiated a programme of removing various Indian nations from lands east of the Mississippi River to the newly created Arkansas Territory, representing a prelude to the more formal and institutionalised policy of Indian removal to what is now Oklahoma that was passed by Congress in 1831 and implemented by Andrew Jackson.

== Jefferson's view of Native Americans ==
Jefferson was fascinated with Indian cultures and languages. His home at Monticello was filled with Indian artifacts obtained from the Lewis and Clark Expedition. He collected information on the vocabulary and grammar of Indian languages.

== Acculturation and assimilation ==
Andrew Jackson is often credited with initiating Indian Removal, because Congress passed the Indian Removal Act in 1831, during his presidency, and also because of his personal involvement in the forceful removal of many Eastern Indian tribes. Congress was implementing suggestions laid out by Jefferson in a series of private letters that began in 1804, although Jefferson did not implement the plan during his own presidency. The rise of Napoleon in Europe, and rumor of a possible transfer of the Louisiana Territory from the Spanish Empire to the more aggressive French, was cause for consternation amongst some people in the American republic. Jefferson advocated for the militarization of the Western border, along the Mississippi River. He felt that the best way to accomplish this was to flood the area with a large population of white settlements.

In a letter written to Benjamin Hawkins on February 18, 1803, Jefferson wrote:

I consider the business of hunting as already become insufficient to furnish clothing and subsistence to the Indians. The promotion of agriculture, therefore, and household manufacture, are essential in their preservation, and I am disposed to aid and encourage it liberally. In truth, the ultimate point of rest and happiness for them is to let our settlements and theirs meet and blend together, to intermix, and become one people. Incorporating themselves with us as citizens of the United States, this is what the natural progress of things will, of course, bring on, and it will be better for them to be identified with us, and preserved in the occupation of their lands, than to be exposed to the many casualties which endanger them while a separate people.

Still recovering from the American Revolutionary War, the U.S. federal government was unable to risk starting a broad conflict with the powerful tribes that surrounded their borders. They were worried that this would cause a broader Indian War, in which the Indians would perhaps be joined by Britain, France or Spain. In his instructions to Meriwether Lewis, Jefferson emphasized the necessity for treating all Indian tribes in the most conciliatory manner.

Jefferson wanted to expand his borders into the Indian territories, without causing a full-blown war. Jefferson's original plan was to coerce native peoples to give up their own cultures, religions, and lifestyles in favor of western European culture, Christian religion, and a sedentary agricultural lifestyle. Jefferson's expectation was that by assimilating the natives into a market-based, agricultural society and stripping them of their self-sufficiency, they would become economically heavily dependent on trade with white Americans, and would thereby be willing to give up land that they would otherwise not part with, in exchange for trade goods or to resolve unpaid debts.

In an 1803 private letter to William Henry Harrison, Jefferson wrote:

To promote this disposition to exchange lands, which they have to spare and we want, for necessaries, which we have to spare and they want, we shall push our trading uses, and be glad to see the good and influential individuals among them run in debt, because we observe that when these debts get beyond what the individuals can pay, they become willing to lop them off by a cession of lands.... In this way our settlements will gradually circumscribe and approach the Indians, and they will in time either incorporate with us as citizens of the United States, or remove beyond the Mississippi. The former is certainly the termination of their history most happy for themselves; but, in the whole course of this, it is essential to cultivate their love. As to their fear, we presume that our strength and their weakness is now so visible that they must see we have only to shut our hand to crush them, and that all our liberalities to them proceed from motives of pure humanity only. Should any tribe be foolhardy enough to take up the hatchet at any time, the seizing the whole country of that tribe, and driving them across the Mississippi, as the only condition of peace, would be an example to others, and a furtherance of our final consolidation.

He stated that Harrison was to keep the contents of the letter "sacred" and "kept within [Harrison's] own breast, and especially how improper for the Indians to understand. For their interests and their tranquility, it is best they should see only the present age of their history."

== Forced removal ==
In cases where Native tribes resisted assimilation, Jefferson believed that to avoid war and probable extermination they should be forcefully relocated and sent west. As Jefferson put it in a letter to Alexander von Humboldt in 1813:

You know, my friend, the benevolent plan we were pursuing here for the happiness of the aboriginal inhabitants in our vicinities. We spared nothing to keep them at peace with one another. To teach them agriculture and the rudiments of the most necessary arts, and to encourage industry by establishing among them separate property. In this way they would have been enabled to subsist and multiply on a moderate scale of landed possession. They would have mixed their blood with ours, and been amalgamated and identified with us within no distant period of time. On the commencement of our present war, we pressed on them the observance of peace and neutrality, but the interested and unprincipled policy of England has defeated all our labors for the salvation of these unfortunate people. They have seduced the greater part of the tribes within our neighborhood, to take up the hatchet against us, and the cruel massacres they have committed on the women and children of our frontiers taken by surprise, will oblige us now to pursue them to extermination, or drive them to new seats beyond our reach.

He told his Secretary of War, General Henry Dearborn (who was the primary government official responsible for Indian affairs): "if we are constrained to lift the hatchet against any tribe, we will never lay it down until that tribe is exterminated, or driven beyond the Mississippi."

Jefferson's first promotions of Indian removal were between 1776 and 1779, when he recommended forcing the Cherokee and Shawnee tribes to be driven out of their ancestral homelands to lands west of the Mississippi River. Indian removal, said Jefferson, was the only way to ensure the survival of Native American peoples. His first such act as president, was to make a deal with the state of Georgia that if Georgia were to release its legal claims to discovery in lands to the west, then the U.S. military would help forcefully expel the Cherokee people from Georgia. At the time, the Cherokee had a treaty with the United States government which guaranteed them the right to their lands, which was violated in Jefferson's deal with Georgia.

== See also ==
- Indian removal
- Manifest destiny
- Population history of Indigenous peoples of the Americas
- Thomas Jefferson and slavery
