= Fountain Hughes =

American slave (1859–1957)

- Born: c. 1859; Charlottesville, Virginia, United States
- Died: July 4, 1957 (aged c. 98); Baltimore, Maryland, United States
- Occupations: Enslaved person, laborer

Fountain Hughes (c. 1859 – July 4, 1957) was an American former slave freed in 1865 after the American Civil War. Born in Charlottesville, Virginia, he worked as a laborer for most of his life, moving in 1881 from Virginia to Baltimore, Maryland. He was interviewed in June 1949 about his life by the Library of Congress as part of the Federal Writers' Project of formerly enslaved people’s oral histories. The recorded interview is online through the Library of Congress and the World Digital Library.

Fountain was a grandson of Wormley Hughes (1743-1858) and Ursula Granger, and great-great-grandson of Betty Hemings, the enslaved matriarch at Monticello. Wormley Hughes and his family were enslaved by President Thomas Jefferson.

== Background and early life ==
After Thomas Jefferson's death in 1826, Wormley Hughes (who had worked as a gardener) was among a group of enslaved peoples who were "given their time." This was an informal freedom, a non-legally binding release from the demands of enslavement without legal release, awarded usually to respective members of the slave-holder's own enslaved descendants and, at times, to other enslaved people deemed to have shown especially dedicated service. Despite this, Hughes' wife Ursula and all their children were sold in 1827, along with all but five enslaved persons from Monticello, to settle outstanding debts of the estate. Hughes appealed to Jefferson's grandson to try to keep his family together; Thomas Jefferson Randolph purchased Hughes' wife and his three sons and took them with Wormley to his plantation of Edge Hill at Shadwell, Virginia. Three daughters of Hughes were sold ultimately to people in Missouri and Mississippi; others stayed closer.

Fountain Hughes was born near Charlottesville, Virginia. He states that his grandfather was enslaved by Thomas Jefferson. His father was killed in the American Civil War. As a child, Hughes was sometimes sent as a messenger to another house and would carry a pass to show he was allowed to travel. He said none of the enslaved boys were given shoes until they were about 12 or 13; they always went barefoot. He describes moments when his feet bled due to not being able to wear shoes. He also said that boys also had to wear dresses like women. He described sleeping on pallets on the floor of their quarters; they did not have beds until after freedom. After being freed, he worked for a dollar a month.

== Later life ==
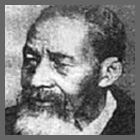
Hughes in 1952

Hughes moved to Baltimore in 1881. For a time, he worked as a manure hauler for a man named Reed. An interview with him was recorded on June 11, 1949, by Hermond Norwood, a Library of Congress engineer at the time. It has been included with other interviews done by the Federal Writers' Project during the Great Depression. The recording is available online at the World Digital Library, as well as through the Library of Congress.

Hughes noted changes from how people lived in the early 20th century. He said that in the 1940s, many people bought things on credit instead of saving up for them. He said, "If I've wanted anything, I'd wait until I got the money and I paid for it cash." He also said that, when he was growing up in the 19th century, young people could not spend money until they were 21 because they would be suspected of stealing the money. Children never had money to spend on their own. When asked which life he preferred, Hughes said he would rather be dead than a slave again. Hughes died in 1957.

== Claimed age ==
Probate record documenting sale of Fountain Hughes from the estate of Nathaniel Burnley (1786–1860) to son DW Burnley on 17 April 1860 for $590. Documented 4 Dec 1860.

While Hughes' year of birth has been deduced to be circa 1848 from claims made by him in a recorded interview eight years before his death and at least one newspaper article five years before his death, there is no primary record documentation of this claim. According to federal census records through 1910 (1870, 1880, 1900, 1910), Hughes' enumerated age indicates he was born between 1859 and 1863. By the 1920 census and thereafter, Hughes was enumerated to have been born circa 1849, contradicting at least 40 years' worth of prior documentary evidence in favor of the 1859–1863 deduction(s). Using the 1870–1910 census data gives Hughes an age of approximately 94–98 years at the time of his death (as opposed to a claimed 109) in 1957.

In his Slave Narrative interview taken in 1949, Hughes was asked: "Were you ever sold from one person to another? Were you ever sold?" Hughes answered: "No, I never was sold...I was too young to sell during the war. See, I wasn't old enough during the war to sell..." However, a probate record has been located dated 4 Dec 1860 documenting the sale on 17 April 1860 of Hughes from the estate of Nathaniel Burnley (1786–1860) to Burnley's son Drury Wood Burnley for the sum of $590 (~$16,750 in 2024). The Federal 1860 slave schedule regarding D.W. Burnley enumerated four months later on August 16, 1860, documents 10 slaves owned, six of which are males of the ages of 1, 3, 7, 8, 15, and 44 (no names given), possibly indicating years of birth of 1859, 1857, 1853, and 1852. Given the 1870 census documents Hughes at 11 years of age, the 1859 year of birth seems most accurate, giving an age at death of approximately 98 years.

== See also ==
- Slave narrative
- Betty Hemings
- Monticello
- List of slaves
