= Brockenbrough House =

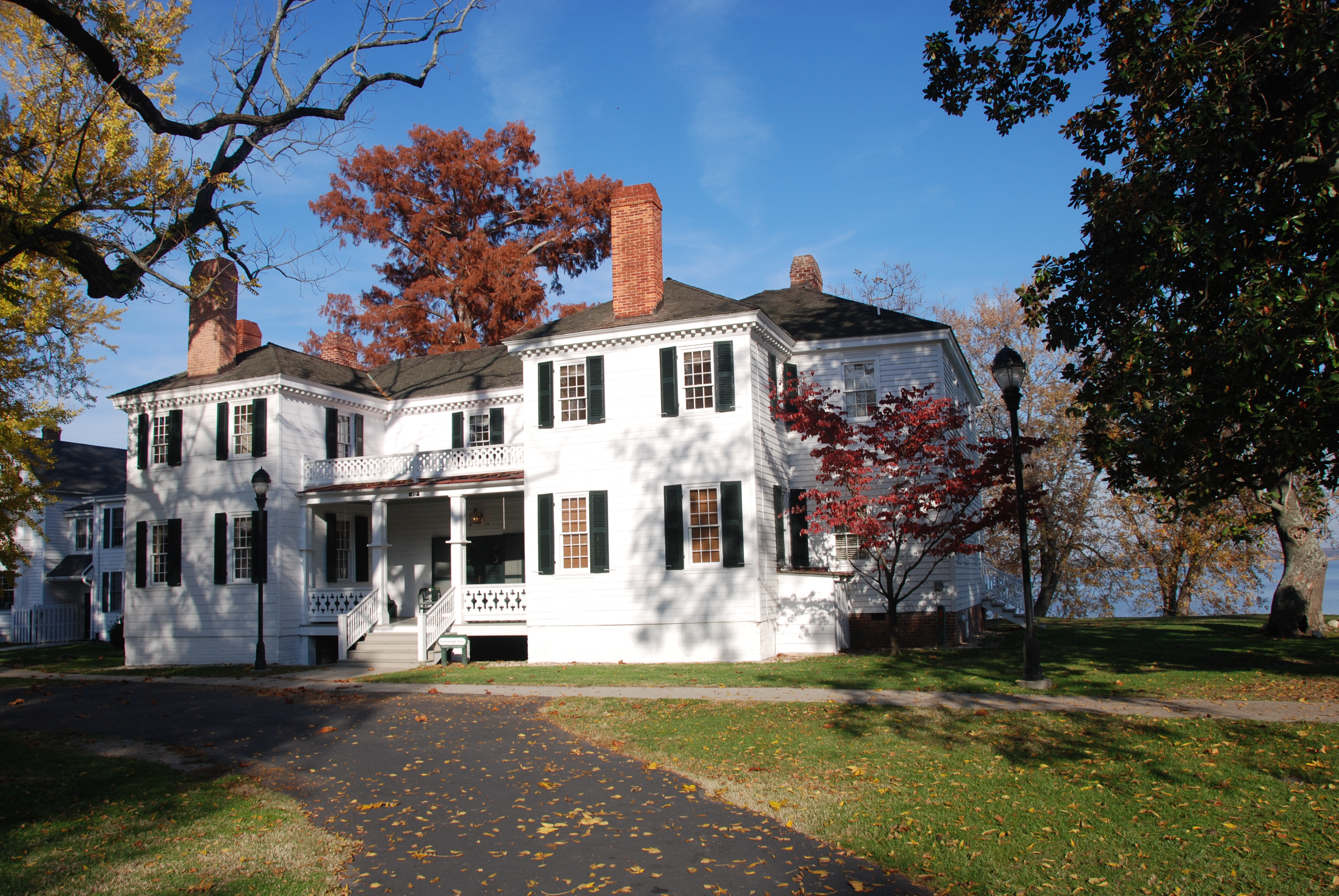
- Built in 1673, it has been part of the St. Margaret's School since 1927.
- Alternative names: McCall-Brockenbrough House

General information
- Architectural style: Georgian architecture
- Location: Water Street, Tappahannock, Virginia, USA
- Coordinates: 37°55′40.6″N 76°51′23.9″W
- Construction started: 1763
- Renovated: 2004–2005
- Renovation cost: $750,000
- Owner: St. Margaret's School

Technical details
- Floor count: Two

Design and construction
- Architect: William Buckland

Renovating team
- Architect: Jody Lahendro
- Other designers: Calder Loth, Senior Architectural Historian
- Main contractor: Henderson Construction

Website
- St. Margaret's School

Brockenborough House is a historic site in Tappahannock, Essex County, Virginia.

The two-story house was built in 1763 over the cellar of the previous house that was built in 1682 by Edward Hill Sr. Archibald McCall hired William Buckland, an architect and master builder, to construct the Georgian style house. It figured in history as the place where McCall was tarred and feathered for his stance on the Stamp Act of 1765. It was shot at during the War of 1812. George Washington stayed at the house numerous times, and was the leader of Dr. Archibald Brockenbrough during the French and Indian War. Benjamin Blake Brockenbrough owned the house during the middle and late 1800s, during which time his cousin Judith Brockenbrough operated a school for girls after the American Civil War until 1875.

In 1927, the house was purchased for the St. Margaret's School campus. It is one of the pre-Revolutionary buildings of the Tappahannock Historic District, which was listed on the National Register of Historic Places in 1973.

== History ==
=== Archibald McCall ===
It was built in 1763 by Archibald McCall, a merchant who was born in Scotland and settled in Colonial America in 1754. He established a merchant business in the town, which was called Hobbs Hole at the time. William Buckland was the architect and master builder of the Georgian style house. The wood work and trim in the house are attributed to Buckland. The building is L-shaped building has two stories and sits over the original cellar. (Located on Lot 1 of the original town plat, there was first a 20 foot square house that was built in 1682 by Edward Hill Sr. (Note: Saison states that the house dates back to 1690.)) The house has high ceilings and a number of windows. A wood staircase in the wide central entrance hall lead up to the second story. It is located on a cliff overlooking the Rappahannock River and across the river from the Mount Airy Plantation.

In 1766, there claimed to have been a riot at McCall's house in reaction to the Stamp Act of 1765. McCall insisted on collecting the British tax on stamps and other documents. He was tarred and feathered by a mob in what has been described as "one of the foremost demonstrations against the Stamp Act". The house was frequented by George Washington. During the War of 1812, a British gunboat in the Rappahannock River shelled the house and broke the black marble mantel in the drawing room. It was repaired and is still in use in the house.

=== Brockenbroughs ===
Dr. Austin Brockenbrough purchased the house in 1813 for himself and his wife, Francis Blake. He was the son of Dr. John Brockenbrough (1741–1801) and the brother of Dr. John Brockenbrough, who built what became the White House of the Confederacy. During the French and Indian War, Austin Brockenbrough served in the 1st Virginia Regiment under George Washington. He served during War of 1812 in the 6th Virginia Regiment. He was a prominent physicians and served in the Virginia House of Delegates. When Austin died in 1858, his son Benjamin inherited the house.

Benjamin Blake and Annie Mason Brockenbrough made over a room in the house to a chapel. In 1865, they loaned the house to his cousin Judith White Brockenbrough McGuire and Reverend John P. McGuire, her husband. A girls' school was operated by Judith after the American Civil War (1861–1865) and until 1875. She wrote books General Robert E. Lee: A Christian Soldier, Diary of a Southern Refugee and Travels in Europe

In the 1880s, Benjamin moved back into the house and lived there until his death in 1921.

=== Joseph Chinn ===
Judge Joseph Willam Chinn inherited the house from his uncle Benjamin. His mother Gabriella Brockenbrough Chinn (Daughter of Austin Brockenbrough), was born and raised on the property.

=== St. Margaret's School ===
In 1927, the house was sold to Episcopal Diocese of Virginia for the St. Margaret's School in Tappahannock. It has been used as housing for students and staff. It has also been used as an infirmary. The house was restored in 2004 and 2005. It is the Head of School residence and serves as the Alumnae House.
