= Ursula Granger Hughes =

Woman enslaved by Thomas Jefferson

Ursula Granger Hughes (1787-?) was the first woman to have a child in the White House. She was one of 600 people Thomas Jefferson enslaved throughout his lifetime. Ursula spent most of her life on Jefferson's plantation, Monticello, in Charlottesville, Virginia. When she was fourteen, Jefferson ordered her to come to the White House to train under Honoré Julien to be the next head cook in Monticello. Her apprenticeship was short-lived due to her pregnancy with her first child.

== Family and background ==
Ursula Granger Hughes was born in 1787 and enslaved at birth by Thomas Jefferson on his private plantation in Monticello. Ursula had strong family ties in Monticello as she was the granddaughter of the "King" and "Queen" of Monticello, George and Ursula Granger. George had been the only black foreman at the plantation and Ursula Granger was Martha Jefferson Randolph's wet nurse and previous head cook. She was also married to Wormley Hughes, a principal gardener at Monticello. Ursula and Wormley had thirteen known children together.

== Life in Monticello ==
Thomas Jefferson was known to be a Francophile, one who enjoys France's culture, art, and food in particular. He embraced the fact that he could train the people he enslaved to attend to his customs instead of hiring an expensive laborer. He strategically chose teenage girls because he thought they would be less of a problem at the White House. At the age of fourteen, Hughes was ordered by Jefferson to come to the White House during his presidency to train as the next head cook in Monticello. She was instructed to learn under French chef Honoré Julien, and then she returned to Monticello in 1802.

== Ursula's life after the White House ==
Ursula's apprenticeship with Honoré Julien did not last long due to her pregnancy with her first child. It was challenging for her to raise her child and continue learning under Honoré Julien. Shortly after her unsuccessful apprenticeship, Jefferson sent Ursula and her son back home to Monticello. After arriving in Monticello, she continued working in the kitchen and laboring in the fields. Ursula and her husband would also have the rest of their children at Monticello. A year after Jefferson died in 1826, Ursula and eight of her children were sold to a new enslaver. Most of the family would be reunited after Jefferson's grandson, Thomas Jefferson Randolph, repurchased them.
