= Isaac Jefferson =

Man enslaved by Thomas Jefferson (1775–1846)

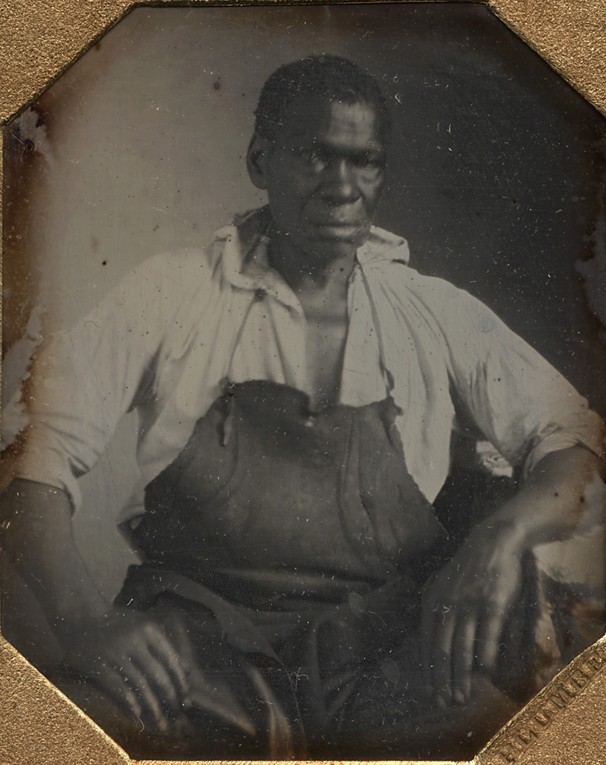
- Born: 1775
- Died: 1846 (aged 70–71)

Isaac Jefferson, also likely known as Isaac Granger (c. 1775 – 1846) was a slave owned by US President Thomas Jefferson who crafted and repaired products as a tinsmith, blacksmith, and nailer at Jefferson's Monticello estate.

Although Thomas Jefferson gave Isaac and his family to his daughter Maria and her husband John Wayles Eppes in 1797 as a wedding gift, Isaac Jefferson/Granger appeared to gain his freedom by 1822 according to his memoir. In the 1840 census, he was recorded as Isaac Granger, a free man working in Petersburg, Virginia. Rev. Charles Campbell interviewed him there and published his memoir under the name of Isaac Jefferson in 1847 a year after Isaac's death. Granger/Jefferson describes Thomas Jefferson as a master and his part in the lives of his slaves.

== Early life ==
Born into slavery in 1775, Isaac was the fourth son of Ursula Granger and Great George (a son Archy died in early childhood before Isaac was born). His father rose in the hierarchy from foreman of labor to become overseer of Monticello in 1797, the only slave to reach that position under Thomas Jefferson. He was paid an annual wage of £20. In 1773, Jefferson had purchased Isaac's mother Ursula and she became a highly trusted domestic slave. She served as a pastry cook and laundress, with duties including meat preservation and the bottling of cider. Isaac's older brothers were George and Bagwell.

Isaac spent his childhood on the plantation near his parents. His early tasks included carrying fuel, lighting fires, and opening gates. Because Jefferson took Great George, Ursula, and their family with him to Williamsburg and Richmond when he was elected governor, the boy Isaac witnessed dramatic events during the Revolutionary War. He later recounted vivid memories of 1781, including Benedict Arnold's raid on Richmond and seeing the internment camp for captured slaves at Yorktown.

== Enslavement at Monticello ==
Probably about 1790 at the age of 15, Isaac began his apprentice training in the metalworking trades. During the George Washington administration, Jefferson took Isaac as part of his household to Philadelphia which was then the nation's capital. He arranged to have the youth apprenticed for several years to a tinsmith, a skilled and valued trade. Isaac Jefferson's account is the only source for this aspect of his working life. He learned to make graters, pepper boxes, and tin cups, about four dozen a day.

After the household's return to Monticello, the Jefferson set up a tin shop. Isaac Granger/Jefferson recalled that it did not succeed economically. Training as a blacksmith under his older brother Little George, Isaac added to his skills. Sometime after 1794, he became a nailer as well, and was assigned to both nail making and smithing.

== Marriage and family ==
By 1796, Granger had a wife named Iris and a son Joyce. He was working extra hours in the blacksmith shop to make chain traces, for which Jefferson paid him three pence a pair. According to Jefferson's records, Granger was a most productive nailer. In the first three months of that year, he made 507 pounds of nails in 47 days, wasting the least amount of nail rod in the process. He earned the highest daily return for his master: the equivalent of eighty-five cents a day.

== Moving from Monticello ==
In October 1797, Thomas Jefferson gave Isaac, his wife Iris, and their sons Joyce and Squire to his daughter Maria and John Wayles Eppes as part of their marriage settlement. This was customary practice in those years by planters who had sufficient slave holdings. He also gave the Eppes the 14-year-old slave Betsy Hemmings, who would serve as their children's nurse and became the matriarch of the slave society at the Eppes plantation, Mont Blanco, in Chesterfield County.

When Jefferson's son-in-law Thomas Mann Randolph needed a blacksmith, he leased Isaac from Eppes. Isaac and his young family moved from Eppes's plantation, Millbrook, in Buckingham County to the Randolph plantation of Edgehill in Albemarle County in 1798. Their daughter, Maria, was born soon after. Isaac's memoir suggests that he lived at Monticello during Jefferson's retirement years. He and his family may have been chosen to accompany Martha Jefferson Randolph and her children there in 1809, when she moved to help her father.

In 1799 and 1800, Isaac's parents and brother Little George all died within a few months of each other. While ill, the family members consulted a black conjurer living in Buckingham County. (This showed the persistence of African traditions within the slave community.) Shortly after Great George's death, Thomas Jefferson gave Isaac $11, the value of "his moiety of a colt left him by his father."

In 1812, an Isaac belonging to Thomas Mann Randolph ran away and was caught and imprisoned in Bath County. It is unknown whether this was Isaac the blacksmith. Randolph had records of owning at least one other Isaac in this period.

== Freedom and memoir ==
How Isaac gained his freedom is unknown. His memoir recounts that he left Albemarle County about four years before Jefferson's death, around 1822. He met and talked to the French general, the Marquis de Lafayette, in Richmond in 1824.

Twenty-first century research by the staff at Monticello discovered that Isaac Jefferson may have taken the name Isaac Granger in freedom or used it before that in the slave community. Someone else may have later mistakenly assigned him the name of Jefferson. The 1840 census of Petersburg, Virginia includes a free black man, Isaac Granger, whose family members and age match what is known of Isaac Jefferson.

In the early 1840s, Granger was working as a free man in Petersburg as a blacksmith, when he was interviewed by Charles Campbell, who published the account that year as the memoir of Isaac Jefferson. Granger did not say whether he took the surname Jefferson by choice or whether a white man imposed it, as was the case with his fellow Monticello slave Israel Jefferson. The memoir was rediscovered and published again in 1951 by the historian Rayford Logan. In the interview, Granger recounted details about the relationship of Thomas Jefferson and the Hemings (or Hemmings) family. He said that "folks said that" Sally Hemings and at least some of her siblings "was old Mr. Wayles' children" in reference to Jefferson's father-in-law, John Wayles. Some scholars think that adds weight to other historic testimony that Sally Hemings and her five full siblings were half-siblings of the president's wife Martha Wayles Skelton Jefferson. The memoir describes the integral role which the Betty Hemings family played at Monticello as domestic slaves, skilled artisans and craftsmen, and staff who ran the president's mansion.

The fate of Isaac's wife Iris and their two sons is unknown. In 1840s, at the time of his memoir, Isaac was married to his second wife. Rev. Charles Campbell wrote that Isaac Jefferson died "a few years after these his recollections were taken down. He bore a good character." Campbell may have imposed the name Jefferson to attract more attention to his published memoir.

Isaac Jefferson died in 1846. According to a document from August 20, 1846, "Isaac Jefferson having been dead more than three months & no person having applied for administration of his estate, it is ordered that the same be committed to J Branch Sergt. of this town to be by him administered according to law."

The Monticello staff have found another reference to the Granger surname in Monticello and related records: in the 1870 census of Albemarle County, an Archy Granger and his family were living at Edgehill Plantation, then owned by Thomas Jefferson Randolph, Thomas Jefferson's grandson. They worked for Randolph's sister Septimia Randolph Meikleham. Thomas J. Randolph had purchased Archy from Monticello after his grandfather Jefferson's death in 1826, when 130 slaves were sold to pay off debts of the estate. Archy Granger matches in age the plantation records of Archy, the son of the slaves Bagwell and Minerva of Monticello. (He was the grandson of Great George and Ursula.) In addition, Randolph family letters document an Archy Granger and his family at their plantation of Edgehill. He appears to have been the nephew of Isaac (Jefferson) Granger, and his use of the Granger name is another indication that it was originally adopted within the family.

== Sources ==
- Jefferson at Monticello: Recollections of a Monticello Slave and a Monticello Overseer. Edited by James Adam Bear, Jr., Charlottesville, Virginia, 1967, pg. 4. This book includes recollections of Isaac Jefferson, c. 1847, and Edmund Bacon.
- The family letters of Thomas Jefferson, 1743-1826. Edited by Edwin Morris Betts, and James Adam Bear, Jr.
