= Edith Hern Fossett =

Slave who cooked for Thomas Jefferson

- Born: Edith Hern; 1787
- Died: 1854 (aged 66–67); Cincinnati, Ohio
- Resting place: Union Baptist Cemetery, Cincinnati, Ohio
- Education: Honoré Julien, French chef
- Occupations: Enslaved cook for Thomas Jefferson at President's House (White House) and head cook at Monticello
- Spouse: Joseph Fossett
- Children: 10, including Peter Fossett and Ann-Elizabeth Fossett Isaacs
- Relatives: Mary Hemings (mother-in-law); James Monroe Trotter (grandson-in-law); William Monroe Trotter (great-grandson); Pauline Powell Burns (great-granddaughter)

Edith Hern Fossett (1787–1854) was an African American chef who for much of her life was enslaved by Thomas Jefferson before being freed. Three generations of her family, the Herns, worked in Jefferson's fields, performed domestic and leadership duties, and made tools. Like Hern, they also took care of children. She cared for Harriet Hemings, the daughter of Sally Hemings, at Thomas Jefferson's Monticello plantation when she was a girl.

Hern worked as a cook for President Jefferson at the President's House, now called the White House, with her sister-in-law Fanny Gillette Hern beginning in 1802. They learned to cook French cuisine from Honoré Julien, a French chef. Three of her children with Joseph Fossett were born during her tenure at the President's House. They stayed with her until 1809, the end of Jefferson's second term. While she worked in Washington, D.C., she did not receive a salary, but she earned a two-dollar a month gratuity.

When Hern returned to Monticello, she became the chief cook. She had access to a modern kitchen for its time, which allowed her to cook up to eight items on individually controlled burners, using up to 60 copperware pans and relying on the best tall clock in the house for timing. Her ingredients were freshly gathered from the plantation fields or its ancillary operations, such as the brewery. Every day, she created sumptuous meals—with multiple meat, vegetable, and dessert dishes—for 12 to 25 people a time.

Hern had ten children with her common-law husband, Joseph Fossett. The son of Mary Hemings, he lived at Monticello as a child and worked his way up from a nail-maker to chief blacksmith. Although Joseph Fossett was freed through Jefferson's will, Edith and nine of their ten children were put up for auction in 1827. One of their children had already been given away to Thomas Jefferson Randolph, Jefferson's grandson. Joseph was able to arrange for the purchase of Edith and two children in 1827 and more family members in 1837. That year, Joseph made a statement listing the family members, including Edith, who were emancipated and manumitted. Joseph and Edith moved to Ohio about 1837 and settled in Cincinnati in 1843. Most of Joseph and Edith's children were with them before they died in 1858 and 1854, respectively.

== Early life ==
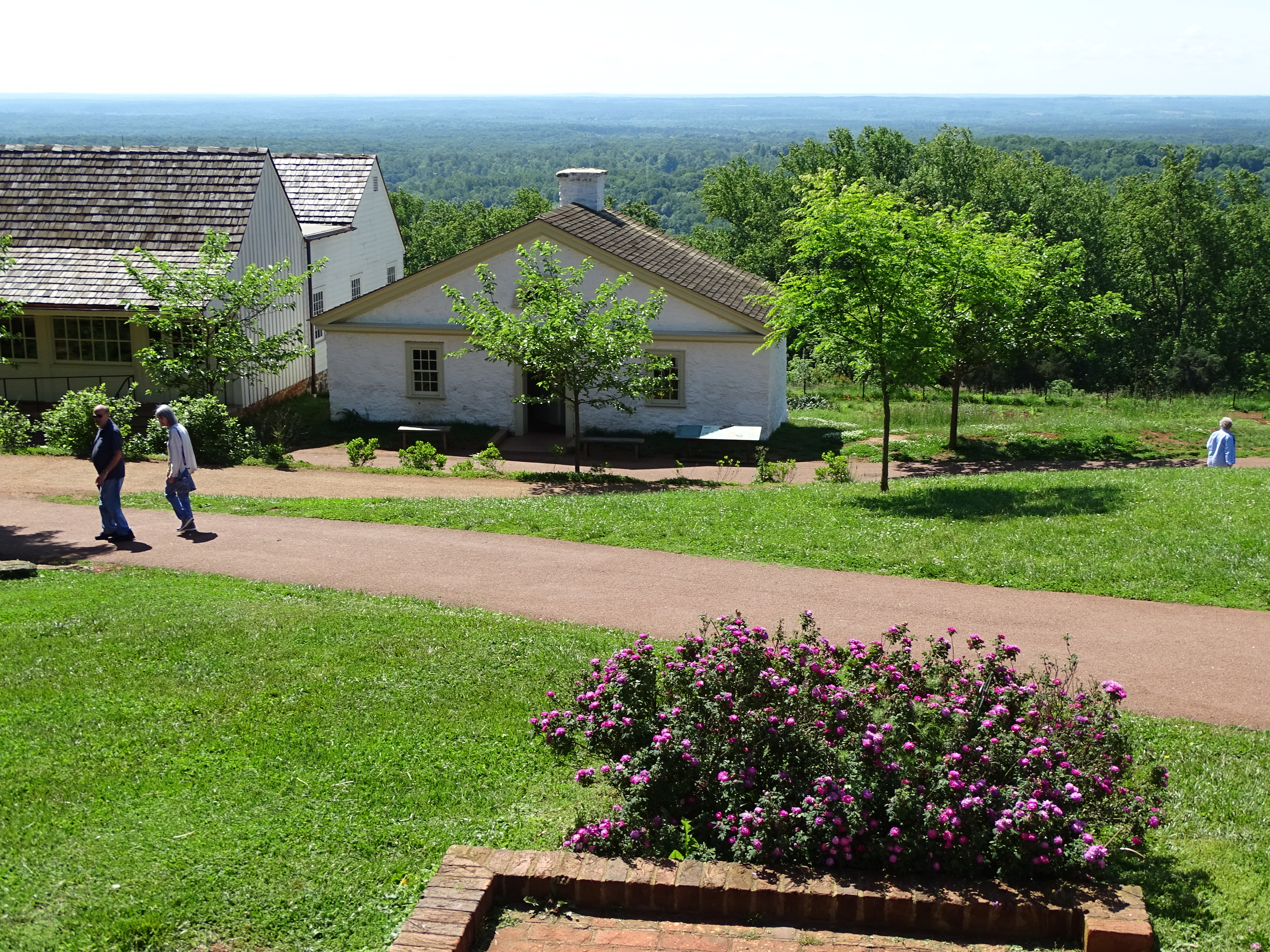
Monticello plantation

Edith Hern was born to David Hern (1755–after 1827) and Isabel Hern (1758–1819) of Monticello. David was an enslaved carpenter. Isabel was an enslaved woman who worked as a domestic and farm laborer. As a girl, Edith tended to Harriet Hemings, the daughter of Sally Hemings.

She had a number of siblings. Thruston was also trained by Julien and was then enslaved by Thomas Jefferson Randolph, Jefferson's grandson. Lily was her sister. James was an enslaved foreman of farm labor. James's wife was at another plantation. Moses was a blacksmith who would walk six miles from Monticello each Sunday to visit his wife and sons. James and Moses ultimately convinced Jefferson to buy their family members so that they could be together. David, also called Davy, was married to Fanny Gillette.

Three generations of the Hern family, which included Isabel and David's grandchildren, "raised Jefferson's crops, drove his wagons, cooked his meals, cared for his children, built his barns, directed his laborers, and made nails, barrels, plows and plow chains."

== French cook ==
Jefferson, who was Minister to France in the late 18th century, enjoyed French cuisine, but employing a French chef for all of his dining and entertaining needs was financially out of reach for him. He therefore had French chefs train a few enslaved people to cook for him, starting with James Hemings, who became his head chef at Hôtel de Langeac, his residence in Paris. Hemings was granted his freedom on February 5, 1796, after agreeing to train his brother Peter to cook. (Note: Peter Hemings, who had been the head cook, was transferred to brewing beer when Edith returned to Monticello.)

=== President's House ===
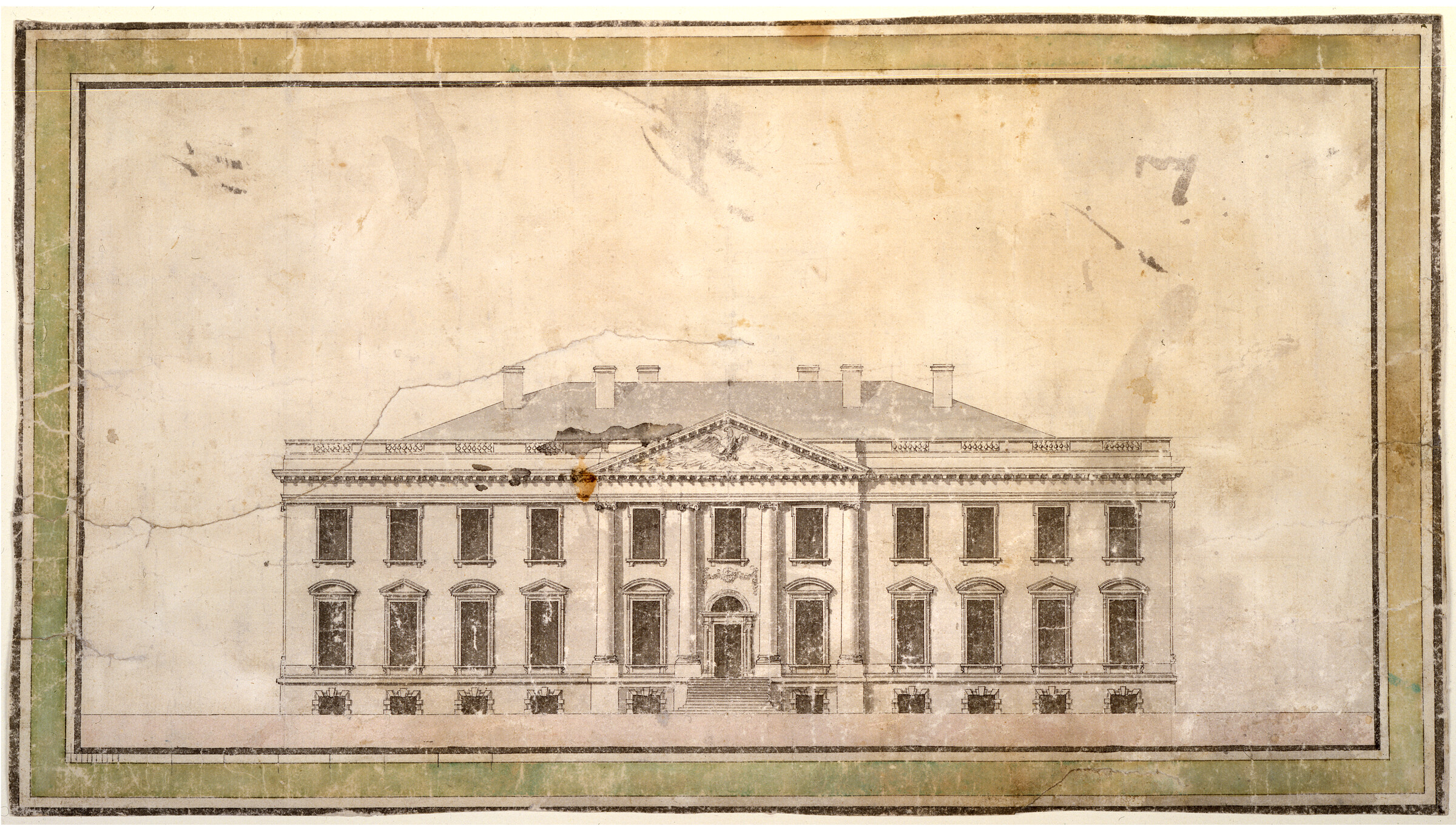
James Hoban, President's House, Washington, D.C., 1793

When Thomas Jefferson was president, he brought Edith Hern and Fanny (Gillette) Hern to Washington, D.C., in 1802 and they learned to cook at the President's House. Edith was 15 years old and Fanny was 18. Honoré Julien, a French chef, taught them how to cook and create French-style foods and elegant desserts. Margaret Bayard Smith remarked of the food, "The excellence and superior skill of his [Jefferson's] French cook was acknowledged by all who frequented his table, for never before had such dinners been given in the President's House".

They [Edith and Fanny] were at the absolute top of the chef's game. But because they were women, because they were black, because they were enslaved and because this was the beginning of the 19th century, they were just known as 'the girls'.

— Leni Sorenson, Monticello research historian

Edith and Fanny were the only slaves from Monticello to regularly live in Washington. Edith did not receive a wage, but earned a two-dollar gratuity each month. Also called "Edy", she had a common-law marriage with Joseph Fossett (November 1780 – September 19, 1858). During the nearly seven years that she worked in Washington, she gave birth to three children: James, Maria, and a child who did not survive to adulthood. Her children were kept with her at the President's House.

=== Monticello ===
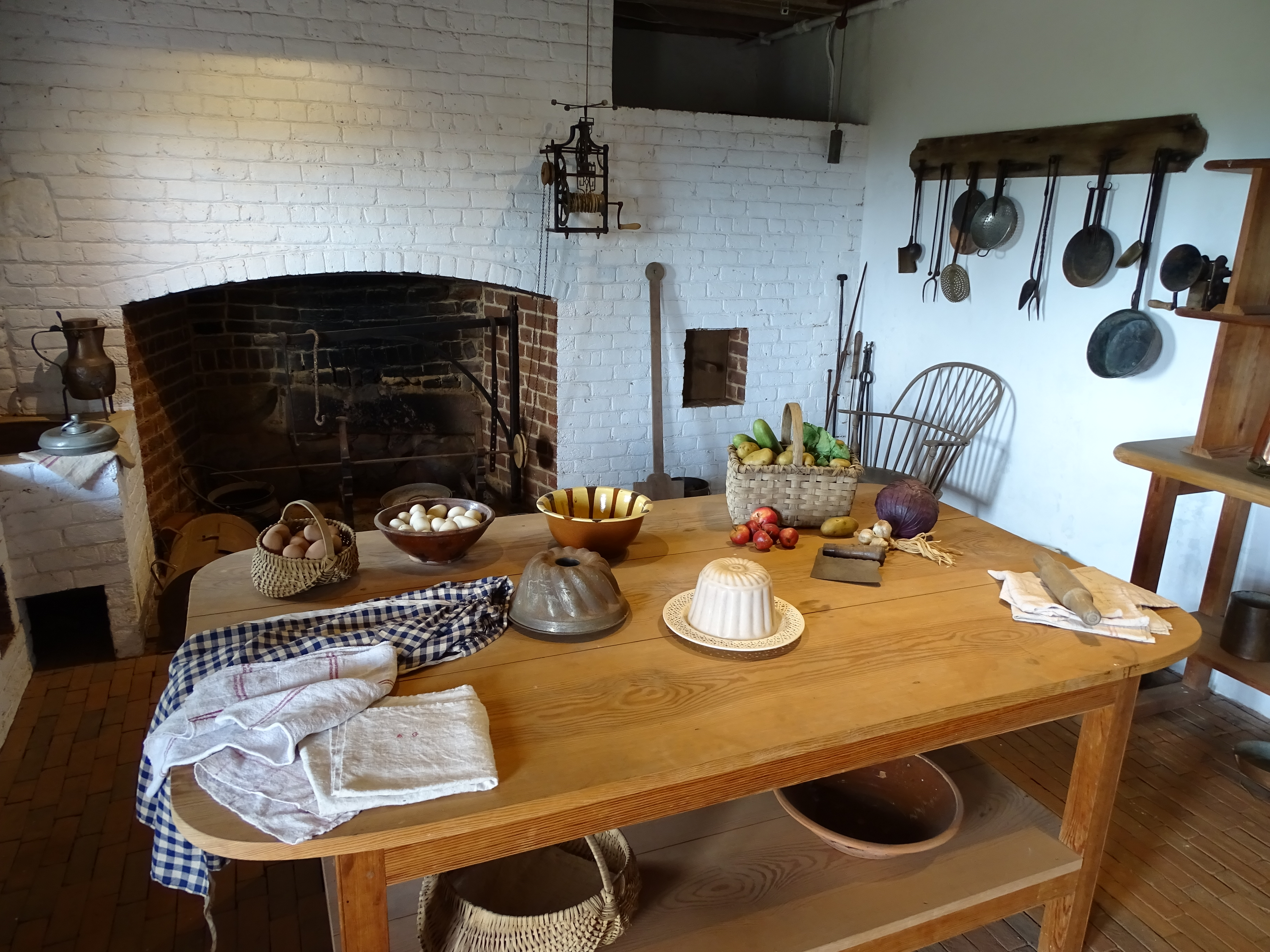
Kitchen at Monticello

Edith returned to Monticello in 1809 at the end of Jefferson's presidential term and became the chief cook, preparing meals for 12 to 25 people each day and up to 57 people for special occasions. Edith and Fanny regularly cooked for Jefferson's daughter Martha Jefferson Randolph and her children, Jefferson's sister Anna Scott Marks and her three children, and Jefferson. Daniel Webster remarked that the cooking at Monticello was "in half Virginian, half French style, in good taste and abundance".

Jefferson had the kitchen upgraded to be "one of the most modern kitchens in the country". Situated below Jefferson's private terrace, it had a bread-baking oven, a stew stove with eight individually regulated burners, a large hearth, and a "set kettle", which generated hot water on demand. The women had use of 60 pieces of French copper cookware, including tart pans, fish cookers, skillets, and chafing dishes. They also had a costly, accurate tall-case clock to ensure precise timing as they cooked. Coffee beans were roasted, hot chocolate was made from blocks of hard chocolate, dinners consisted of three or four meats and fish, and every meal had four desserts. To plan their menus, the women met with the enslaved head gardener, Wormley Hughes, to determine what was fresh or soon to ripen from the berry patches, vegetable gardens, and the orchards. Edith and Fanny worked together in Washington, D.C., and at Monticello until Jefferson's death.

== Marriage and children ==
External image
- Monticello labor force

Edith's husband, Joseph, was the enslaved son of Mary Hemings. As a child, he performed odd jobs around the plantation and fabricated nails. He was made a blacksmith at the age of 16. In the summer of 1806, while Jefferson was visiting Monticello and Edith was in Washington, Joseph received word that there was disturbing news, perhaps about his wife, at the President's House. Joseph escaped from Monticello on July 29, and Jefferson thought that he may have been headed towards Washington, D.C., to be with Edith. Joseph was returned on August 7 by a man Jefferson had hired to retrieve him. He was found on the lawn of the President's House.

The next year, Joseph was made chief blacksmith after the white man who held that position was fired for drunkenness. He was chief blacksmith from 1807 to 1827. Slaves did not generally receive pay at Monticello, but as a manager of the blacksmith shop, Joseph received a percentage of the shop's profits. He was able to earn money at the shop after work hours and keep one sixth of the earnings. He made tools for local farmers, shod horses, and made all the metal parts for a carriage designed in 1814 by Thomas Jefferson. Edmund Bacon, the Monticello overseer, stated that Fossett was "a very fine workman; could do anything... with steel or iron."

=== Children ===
They had ten children, in addition to a baby who was born in 1803 but died in infancy. Jefferson often paid for a midwife named Rachel to attend to Edith's births.

- James (born January 1805) was given by Thomas Jefferson to Thomas Jefferson Randolph in 1816.
- Maria (born October 1807) was at Tufton, one of Jefferson's farms, in 1827. It is unknown what happened to her after that.
- Martha "Patsy" Fossett (1810–1879) was sold to Charles Bonnycastle, an official at the University of Virginia, for $395. The sixteen-year-old ran away after a few months and by 1850 was living in Cincinnati. "Patsy" moved to California about 1850 and married Charles H. Twombly, who was a poor man when they married but became wealthy. Patsy died in 1879 leaving an estate of $10,000, and her will stated that she wanted the money to go to her relatives in Cincinnati, but her husband had forced her to make another will. Fossett's family members (Jesse Fossett, W.B. Fossett, Lucy Loving, Elizabeth Isaacs, Peter Fossett, and Josephine Powell) claimed that the will was made under duress and their marriage was not legal due to the California law against mixed races marrying.
- Ann-Elizabeth (also known as Elizabeth-Ann or Betsy) (1812–1902) was purchased at the 1827 auction by John Winn, a local merchant. She was freed by her father and moved to Ohio in 1840 with her husband, Tucker Isaacs, and children. Because they still had family members in slavery, the Isaacs returned to Charlottesville. They then moved to Ross County, Ohio, where they acquired a 158 acre farm, which was a station on the Underground Railroad. (Note: Tucker Isaacs was the son of Nancy West, an African American woman, and David Isaacs who was a Jewish white man and owned a store. Tucker, born free, owned a lot of land in the Charlottesville area until the early 1850s. Isaacs died in 1874.)
- Peter (1815–1901) was purchased by Tucker Isaacs (his brother-in-law) at an auction in 1850. He moved to Cincinnati where he was a popular Baptist minister, prominent caterer, and a conductor on the Underground Railroad. His remembrances, entitled Once the Slave of Thomas Jefferson were published in 1898.
- Isabella (1819–1872) escaped her enslaver and went to Boston with forged identity papers that had been made by her brother, Peter. She was living in Cincinnati by 1860. Isabella married a man with the surname Turner and had a daughter named Josephine Turner, who married William W. Powell. Isabella died in 1872. She was the grandmother of Pauline Powell Burns.
- William B. (1821–1901), born in 1821, he was purchased by Jesse Scott in 1827 and was declared free and emancipated by his father in 1837. He was a blacksmith who later had a prominent career as a caterer. He died in August 1901.
- Daniel (born 1825) was purchased by Jesse Scott in 1827 and was declared free and emancipated by his father in 1837. He was a blacksmith.
- Lucy was declared free and emancipated by her father in 1837. She married someone with the surname Loving.
- Jesse was declared free and emancipated by his father in 1837. He was a blacksmith.

=== Family separation and reunification ===
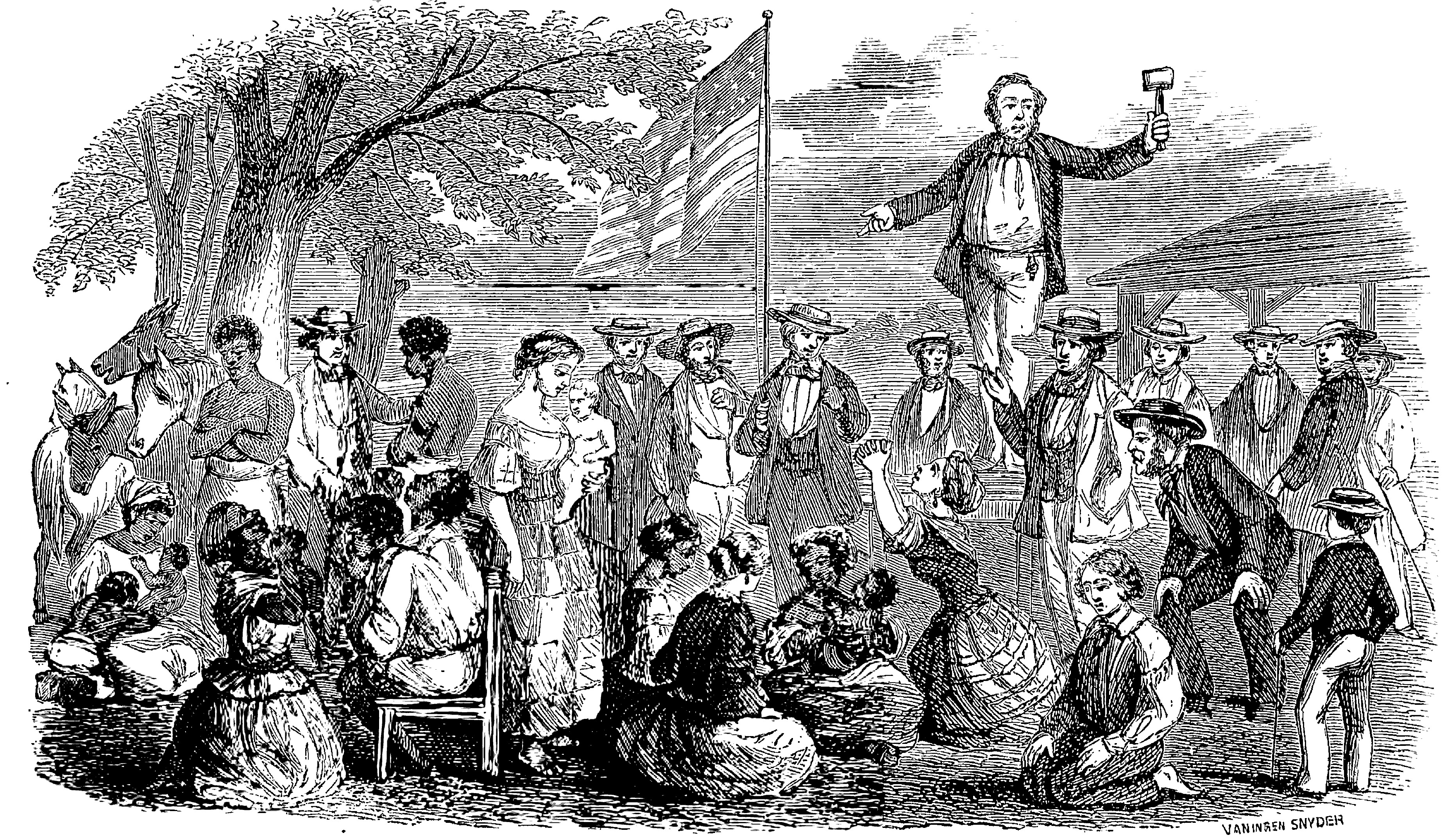
A slave auction

Joseph was freed in accordance with Thomas Jefferson's will, but Edith and her children were not. (Note: Jefferson would not sell Joseph Fossett and Betsy Hemings, the oldest children of Mary Hemings Bell.) An auction was held at Monticello in January 1827, where "130 valuable negroes" were put up for sale, and resulted in the separation of families. Jesse Scott, a "free man of color" bought Edith and two of her children, Daniel and William, for $505. Scott, the husband of Fossett's free half-sister, Sarah Bell Scott, had represented Joseph Fossett in the sale. (Sarah Bell Scott was the daughter of Fossett's mother, Mary Hemings Bell, and Thomas Bell.) The Fossett, Bell, and Scott families were only able to come up with enough money for Edith and two children at that time.

Born and reared as free, not knowing that I was a slave, then suddenly, at the death of Jefferson, put upon an auction block and sold to strangers.

— Peter Fossett

Separate buyers purchased Joseph and Edith's other children: Ann-Elizabeth, Martha (Patsy), Isabella, and Peter Fossett. Joseph saved money from working as a blacksmith to purchase his family members. Joseph, with the help of his mother, Mary Hemings Bell, freed Edith, their five children, and four grandchildren in 1837. Peter's owner refused to sell him. (Note: The Smithsonian magazine states that Joseph and Edith lost three daughters, but it does not appear that includes any enumerated children, except perhaps the first known baby who was born in 1803.)

Fossett went through several processes to ensure that his family members were considered free. When he states below that his family members were manumitted, it means that they were set free from slavery. To say that they were emancipated means that they were free from ownership or control by another, and since they were considered their owner's property, the transaction was documented by a legal deed of emancipation and filed with the government. There are therefore two fundamental ways for a person to be free: one is being freed, generally through purchase, of an owner, the other is the status of being a free person. Virginia had different laws beginning in 1619, and cities within Virginia also had their own laws, for manumission of slaves that specified the manner in which someone may be free. For instance, Virginia enacted a law in 1806 in which freed slaves could be returned to slavery if they stayed in the state more than 12 months.

Know all men by these presents that I Joseph Fossett of the County of Albemarle and state of Virginia have manumitted, emancipated and set free, and by these presents do manumit, emancipate and set free the following negro slaves to wit, Eady, Elizabeth Ann, William, Daniel, Lucy and Jesse and her grandchildren James, Joseph, Thomas and Maria Elizabeth an infant. And I heareby [sic] declare the said Eady, Elizabeth Ann, William, Daniel, Lucy and Jesse, James, Joseph, Thomas and Maria Elizabeth hereby emancipated are of the following description ages and height—viz.: Eady a woman of brown complexion 5 feet 2 inches and 44 years old.

— Joseph Fossett

The family then moved to Ohio where most of the children were able to establish a life for themselves. By 1843, they were settled in Cincinnati. Joseph Fossett was a blacksmith, as were his sons, Daniel, William and Jesse. The Fossett family helped people obtain their freedom on the Underground Railroad. Tucker Isaacs, Elizabeth Anns's husband, purchased Peter in 1850. (Note: Snodgrass states that Isaacs purchased his wife in 1850, but there are a number of sources that state that she was purchased by Joseph in 1837 and the Isaacs went to Ohio in 1840.) By the time of Joseph and Edith's deaths, almost all of the Fossett children were in Ohio.

== Descendants ==
Fossett's great-grandson was William Monroe Trotter. A great-granddaughter was Pauline Powell Burns. Their descendants include attorneys, artists, caterers, musicians, and civil servants. Every generation has "fought for freedom and equality".

== Death ==
Edith died September 10, 1854, and Joseph died September 18, 1858. They are buried at the Union Baptist Cemetery, Cincinnati, Ohio, with their names engraved on the Fossett family tombstone.
