= George W. Hayes =

American politician (1847–1933)

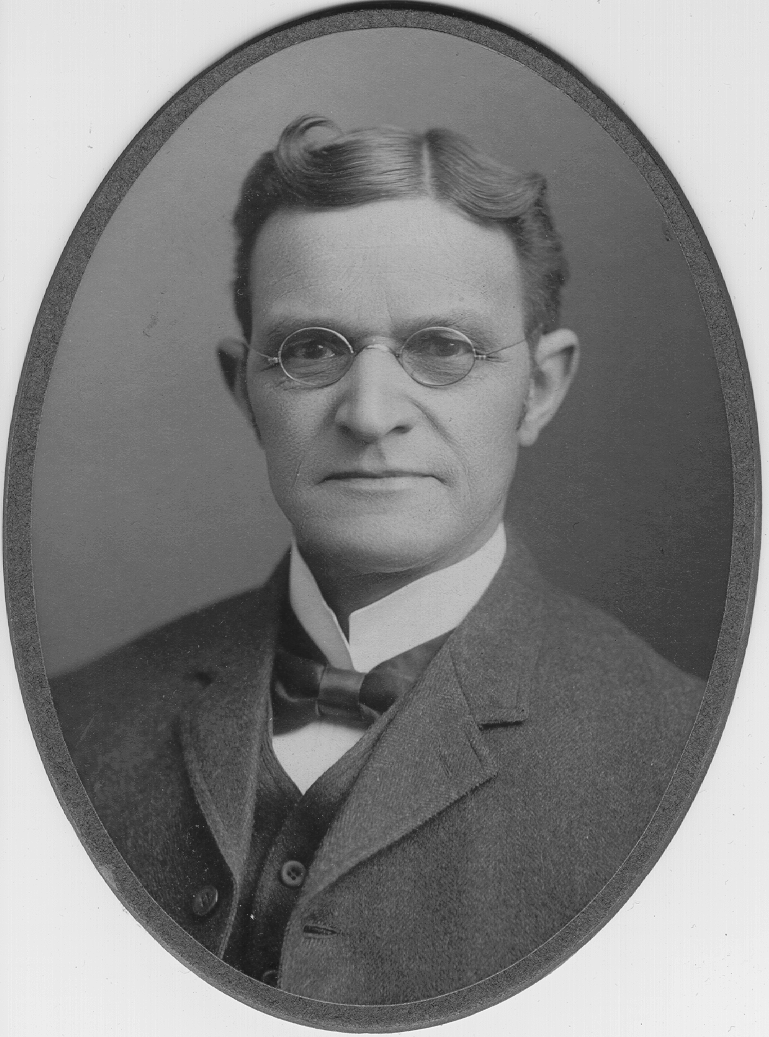

Ohio House of Representatives
- In office 1902–1905

Personal details
- Born: George Washington Hays; November 1, 1847 St. Landry Parish, Louisiana, U.S.
- Died: 1933 (aged 85–86)
- Resting place: Union Baptist Cemetery, Cincinnati, Ohio, U.S.
- Occupation: Ohio state legislator, court crier, surveyor

George Washington Hayes (November 1, 1847 – 1933), also known as George W. Hays, was an American state legislator, a former slave, and a court crier. He was the first African-American court crier in Cincinnati, Hamilton County, Ohio; and served as a Republican in the Ohio House of Representatives from 1902 to 1905 (75th–76th General Assemblies).

== Early life and family ==
George Washington Hayes was born on November 1, 1847, near St. Landry Parish, Louisiana. He had Creole, African American and Native American heritage, and he was enslaved early in his life. Hayes was the youngest child of Anna and Joshua Hays; his mother was enslaved and was of African American and Native American descent, and his father was a free Creole. He was taken with his mother to Franklin, Kentucky when he was 7 years old.

== Career ==
Hayes was forced into the Confederate Army around 1862 when he was a teenager, and later escaped in order to join the Union Army at Fort Negley in Nashville. He was with General William Tecumseh Sherman on his march to the sea. Hayes stayed with the Union Army until April 1865.

He moved to New York City after the war, where he initially worked as a waiter and took classes. Hayes married Mamie Forte in 1874, and they had five children. He and his family were members of the Union Baptist Church, Cincinnati.

Hayes served as a Republican in the Ohio House of Representatives from Hamilton County, from 1902 to 1905 (75th–76th General Assemblies).

Hayes was a trustee of the Ohio Institute of the Blind, and the Curry Normal and Industrial Institute. He was superintendent of Sunday schools for both the Union Baptist Church and the Calvary Baptist Church. Hayes was a 32nd degree Mason, the district grand director of the Grand United Order of Odd Fellows, and a member of True Reformers.

He is buried in the Union Baptist Cemetery in the Price Hill neighborhood of Cincinnati. The Hayes Elementary School in Cincinnati is named for him.

== See also ==
- African American officeholders from the end of the Civil War until before 1900
