= Mary Hemings Bell =

American homemaker enslaved by Thomas Jefferson

- Born: Mary Hemings c. 1753; Charles City County, Virginia
- Died: after 1834; Charlottesville, Virginia
- Occupations: Domestic servant; free homemaker
- Children: 6
- Parent: Elizabeth Hemings
- Relatives: Joseph Fossett (son); Peter Fossett (grandson); Ann-Elizabeth Fossett Isaacs (granddaughter); Sally Hemings (younger sister), Hemings family

Mary Hemings Bell (c. 1753 – after 1834) was born into slavery, most likely in Charles City County, Virginia, as the oldest child of Elizabeth Hemings, a mixed-race slave held by John Wayles. After the death of Wayles in 1773, Elizabeth, Mary, and her family were inherited by Thomas Jefferson, the husband of Martha Wayles Skelton, a daughter of Wayles, and all moved to Monticello.

While Jefferson was in France, Hemings was hired out to Thomas Bell, a wealthy white merchant in Charlottesville, Virginia. She became his common-law wife and they had two children together. Bell purchased her and the children from Jefferson in 1792 and informally freed them. Mary Hemings Bell was the first Hemings to gain freedom. The couple lived together all their lives. (They were prohibited from marriage by Virginia law at the time.)

In 2007 Mary Hemings Bell was recognized as a Patriot of the Daughters of the American Revolution, because she had been taken as a prisoner of war during the American Revolution. By this honor, all her female descendants are eligible to join the DAR.

== Early life ==
Mary, the daughter of Elizabeth (Betty) Hemings, was born into slavery. (Note: Her father is unknown. There is a theory that she was born to a white man and another that her father was a man of African descent. The father(s) of Betty's children, like that of other slaves, is difficult to determine, although it is clear that some of the men where white, which could have been white laborers, overseers, or the owner of the plantation. The children of enslaved women were slaves no matter who their father was.) Betty was the biracial daughter of an enslaved African woman and an English sea captain whose surname was Hemings. Mary was the first of Elizabeth's twelve children. Hemings lived at John Wayles' plantation until his son-in-law, Thomas Jefferson, received her as part of a division of Wayles' estate on January 14, 1774. (Note: The 135 slaves, which included Betty Hemings and her ten children, that Jefferson acquired from Wayles's estate made him the second largest slaveowner in Albemarle County with a total of 187 slaves. The number fluctuated approximately 200 slaves until 1784 when he began to give away or sell slaves. By 1794 he had divested himself of 161 individuals.)

She was a "valued household servant" and seamstress. Like her mother and sisters, she worked in the household where she took care of Martha Jefferson and her children, sewed, and cleaned. The overseer did not have control or responsibility for managing the work of the female members of the Hemings family.

== Family ==
Mary Hemings had six children, some of whom were freed and some of whom were separated from her when they were sold.

=== Initial children ===
She initially had four children:

- Daniel Farley (1772-1837), Jefferson gave him to his sister,
- Molly Hemings (1777-after 1790), Jefferson gave her to his daughter Martha Jefferson Randolph as a wedding gift, along with seven other slaves;
- Joseph Fossett (1780-1858), his father was believed to be William Fossett, a white craftsman at Monticello. (Note: Jefferson told his superintendent to "dispose of Mary according to her desire, with such of her younger children as she chose." Jefferson kept Mary's slightly older children, Joseph Fossett, age 12, and Betsy, then age nine, at Monticello, splitting up the family. They were likely cared for by aunts and a grandmother, while Mary provided personal items and clothes, finer than that of other slaves of Monticello, and kept in contact with Thomas and Betsy.) In 1826 Jefferson freed Joseph Fossett by his will, in recognition of his valuable service as an ironworker. To settle debts of the estate, 130 Monticello slaves were sold, including Fossett's wife Edy and their children. With the help of his mother Mary Bell and other free family members, Fossett over several years purchased the freedom of his wife and most of his children. The family moved from Virginia to the free state of Ohio about 1840. (Note: Fossett had also arranged to buy his son Peter's freedom at a particular time. But in 1833, John Jones, the boy's master, reneged on a previous agreement to sell Peter to Fossett. According to Peter Fossett's memoir, published in The New York World, 30 January 1898, he had learned to read and write by then. Peter made and gave his sister Isabel, also still enslaved, a "free pass" that enabled her to travel; she escaped to Boston and freedom. Peter escaped twice but was captured, and in 1850 was sold. Friends of his father bought him and freed him, and Peter was finally able to join his father and the rest of the family in Cincinnati. He became a minister.)
- Betsy Hemmings, (1783-1857) Her descendants say their family oral tradition is that Betsy was fathered by the recently widowed Thomas Jefferson, whose wife died in 1782. The historian Lucia Stanton found documentation that her mother Mary Hemings was one of the household slaves whom Jefferson took to Williamsburg and Richmond to care for the family when he was governor, from 1779 to 1781. Jefferson gave Betsy Hemmings at the age of 14, and 29 other slaves, as a wedding gift to his daughter Mary Jefferson and her new husband John Wayles Eppes. Betsy lived with the Eppes family for the rest of her life. Her descendants say she was his concubine from about age 21, after he was widowed, and through his second marriage. They had a daughter, Frances, and a son, Joseph, together and other children. (The names of other children were lost when a fire destroyed the plantation records.) According to her descendants, their relationship continued after he married a second time five years later, although it was not openly acknowledged. Betsy Hemmings was buried next to Eppes in his family cemetery at the plantation and her grave is marked by a tombstone similar to his. His second wife was buried at her daughter's plantation.

=== With Thomas Bell ===
During Jefferson's stay in Paris as U.S. minister to France, his overseer hired out Mary Hemings (with her two younger children) to Thomas Bell in Charlottesville. Mary Hemings became partner to Thomas Bell and they had two children:

- Robert Washington Bell (died 1834) and
- Sarah Jefferson Bell (c. 1785-after 1840). Also known as Sally, in 1802 she married Jesse Scott, who was a musician who performed across Virginia with his sons. Scott also purchased Edith Fossett and two of her children with Joseph Fossett in 1827 so that they would be free to live with Joseph.

After his return and at Mary's request, Jefferson sold Mary and her two younger children to Bell in 1792. Bell informally freed the three of them that year, acknowledging the children as his. Hemings then took Bell's name.

Thomas and Mary Bell lived the remainder of their lives together and Thomas Bell became a good friend of Jefferson. Mary Hemings Bell was the first of Betty's children to gain freedom. When Thomas Bell died in 1800, he left Mary and their Bell children a sizable estate, treating them as free in his will. The property included lots on Charlottesville's Main Street. He depended on his neighbors and friends to carry out his wishes, which they did. Hemings lived in a house on Main Street. Although free, Mary Hemings remained in close communication with her enslaved family at Monticello and gave gifts to her children and others. She was remembered by them many years after her death. As an elderly man, her grandson Peter Fossett recalled how when he was a child, his free grandmother Mary gave him a suit of blue nankeen cloth and a red leather hat and shoes, grand compared to the attire of children of field slaves. She finished her days in Charlottesville. Her grave site remains unknown.

== American Revolutionary War ==
In 1780, after Jefferson was elected as the governor of Virginia during the American Revolutionary War, he moved his family to the state capitol of Williamsburg, taking along with them a number of slaves, including Hemings. The following year, Jefferson relocated his household to the new capital of Richmond. When British forces led by Benedict Arnold raided Richmond searching for Jefferson, they took Mary Hemings and other slaves owned by him as prisoners of war. After the 1781 siege of Yorktown, Hemings was released from British captivity and returned to being enslaved by Jefferson. In 2007, the Daughters of the American Revolution (DAR) declared Hemings to be a "Patriot of the Revolution" by virtue of her status as a prisoner of war, which automatically qualified Hemings' female descendants as eligible to join the DAR; Hemings was the first slave to be honored as such.

== Descendants ==
One of Mary's most notable descendants was William Monroe Trotter, who became a prominent Boston newspaper publisher, human rights activist, and a founder of the Niagara Movement, precursor of the National Association for the Advancement of Colored People (NAACP). Trotter was graduated magna cum laude from Harvard University in 1895; in his junior year he became the first man of color to earn a Phi Beta Kappa key there. Trotter was a contemporary of fellow Harvard alumnus W. E. B. Du Bois. In 1896, Trotter earned a master's degree from Harvard, planning a career in international banking. But despite his outstanding credentials, racism thwarted his efforts to find work in that field.

== Sources ==
- Lena Anthony, "Family Ties," American Spirit Magazine, Daughters of the American Revolution, January–February 2009, p. 4
- Memoirs of A Monticello Slave: As Dictated to Charles Campbell in the 1840s by Isaac Jefferson, one of Thomas Jefferson's Slaves, University of Virginia, 1951
- Stephan R. Fox, The Guardian of Boston: William Monroe Trotter, New York: Atheneum, 1970
- Annette Gordon-Reed, The Hemingses of Monticello: An American Family, New York: W.W. Norton & Company, 2008
- Edna Bolling Jacques, "The Hemmings Family in Buckingham County, Virginia", 2002, Buckingham Hemmings Website
- Lucia Stanton, Slavery At Monticello, The Thomas Jefferson Memorial Foundation, Inc., 1993
- Lucia Stanton, "Monticello to Main Street: The Hemings Family and Charlottesville," The Magazine of Albemarle County History, Vol 55, 1997
- Lucia Stanton, Free Some Day: The African-American Families of Monticello, Thomas Jefferson Foundation, Monticello Monograph Series, 2000
