= Union Baptist Cemetery =

Historic cemetery in Ohio

- U.S. National Register of Historic Places
- U.S. Historic district
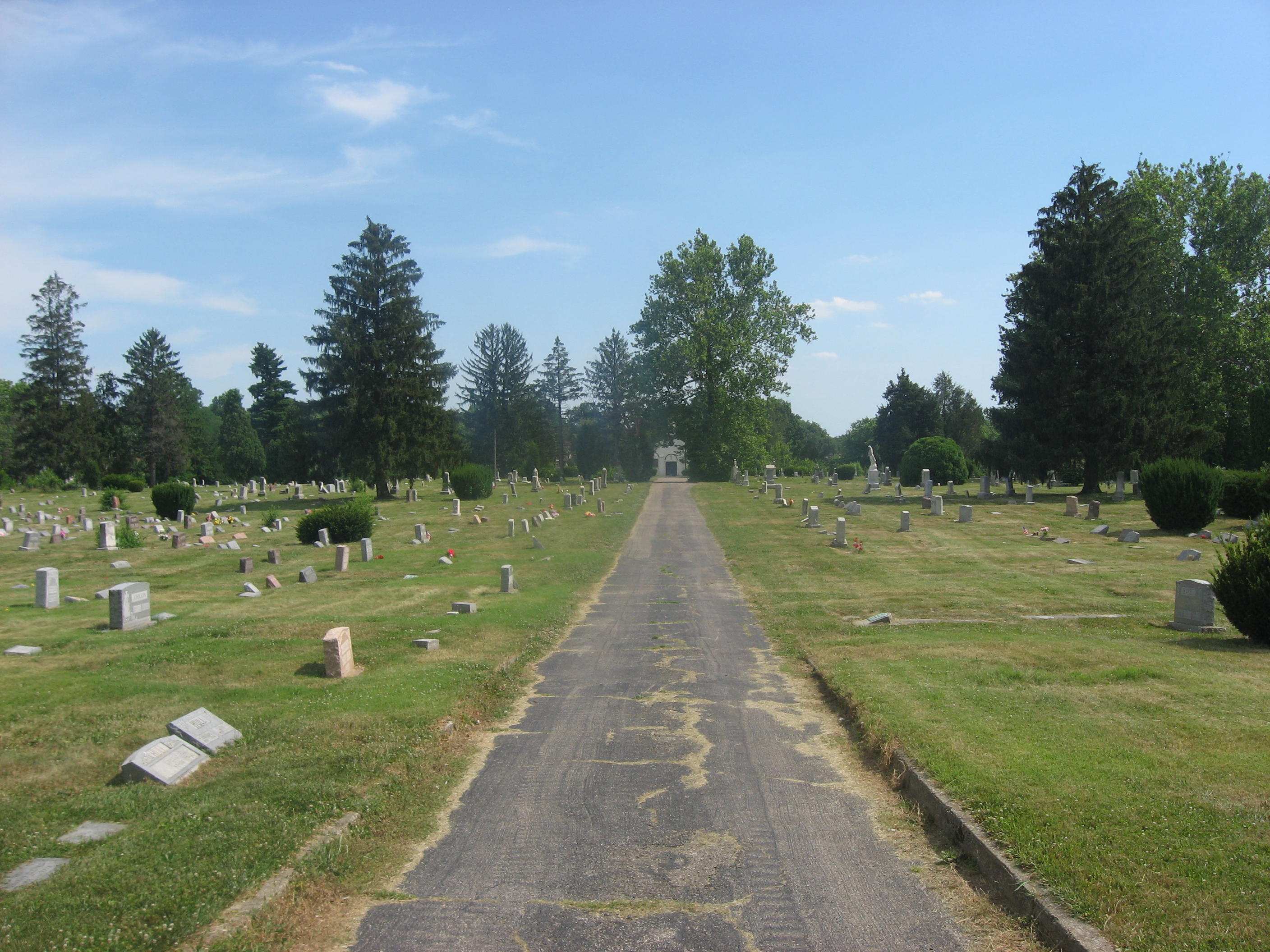
- Overview of the cemetery

- Location within Ohio Location within the United States
- Location: Cincinnati, Ohio
- Coordinates: 39°7′0″N 84°36′10″W
- Area: 160 acres (0.65 km^{2})
- NRHP reference No.: 02001057
- Added to NRHP: September 20, 2002

Union Baptist Cemetery located at 4933 Cleves Warsaw Pike, in the Price Hill neighborhood, is a registered historic district in Cincinnati, Ohio, listed in the National Register of Historic Places on September 20, 2002. It contains a single contributing building. The cemetery is the oldest Baptist African-American cemetery in Cincinnati.

== History ==
The cemetery was established by the Union Baptist Church in 1864 by members of the Union Baptist Church. Almost 150 other USCT veterans are buried at Union Baptist Cemetery.

== Notable burials ==
- Newt Allen, Negro league baseball player
- Powhatan Beaty (1837–1916), American Civil War veteran of the 5th United States Colored Infantry Regiment; a Medal of Honor recipient
- Mary Beck Bell, bishop, founder of the Spiritualist Church of the Soul
- Tiny Bradshaw (1907–1958), musician
- Edith Hern Fossett (1787–1854), enslaved cook for Thomas Jefferson at the White House, and head cook at Monticello
- George W. Hayes (1847–1933), Ohio state legislator
- David Leroy Nickens
- Consuelo Clark-Stewart
- Jennie Porter, founder of the Harriet Beecher Stowe School
- Wallace "Bud" Smith, boxer
