= Peter Fossett =

Former slave (1815–1901)

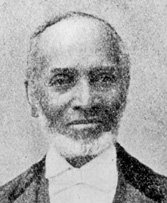
- Born: June 5, 1815
- Died: January 3, 1901 (aged 85)
- Spouse: Sarah M. Fossett
- Parent(s): Edith Hern Fossett; Joseph Fossett
- Relatives: Mary Hemings (grandmother); Betty Hemings (great grandmother), Hemings family

Peter Farley Fossett (June 5, 1815 – January 3, 1901) was an enslaved laborer at Monticello, Thomas Jefferson's plantation, who after he attained his freedom in the mid-19th century, settled in Cincinnati where he established himself as a minister and caterer. He was a captain in the Black Brigade of Cincinnati during the Civil War. Fossett was an activist for education and prison reform. He was a conductor on the Underground Railroad. His remembrances, Once the slave of Thomas Jefferson, were published in 1898.

His wife, Sarah M. Fossett, was active in the church and Underground Railroad as well, but she was also noteworthy in her own right. Trained by a French specialist in New Orleans, she was a hairdresser to the elite women of Cincinnati's society. She was brought to Cincinnati by Abraham Evan Gwynne, the father of Alice Claypoole Vanderbilt. In 1860, she filed a suit after being denied passage on a streetcar, which resulted in the desegregation of streetcars in the city for African-American women. For twenty-five years, she was the manager of the Colored Orphans Asylum in Cincinnati.

== Early life ==
Peter Farley Fossett was born into slavery at Monticello, near Charlottesville, Virginia, on June 5, 1815. His parents were Edith Hern Fossett and Joseph Fossett. Edith was the head cook at Monticello and Joseph was a blacksmith. Slaves did not generally receive pay at Monticello, but as a manager of the blacksmith shop, Joseph received a percentage of the shop's profits.

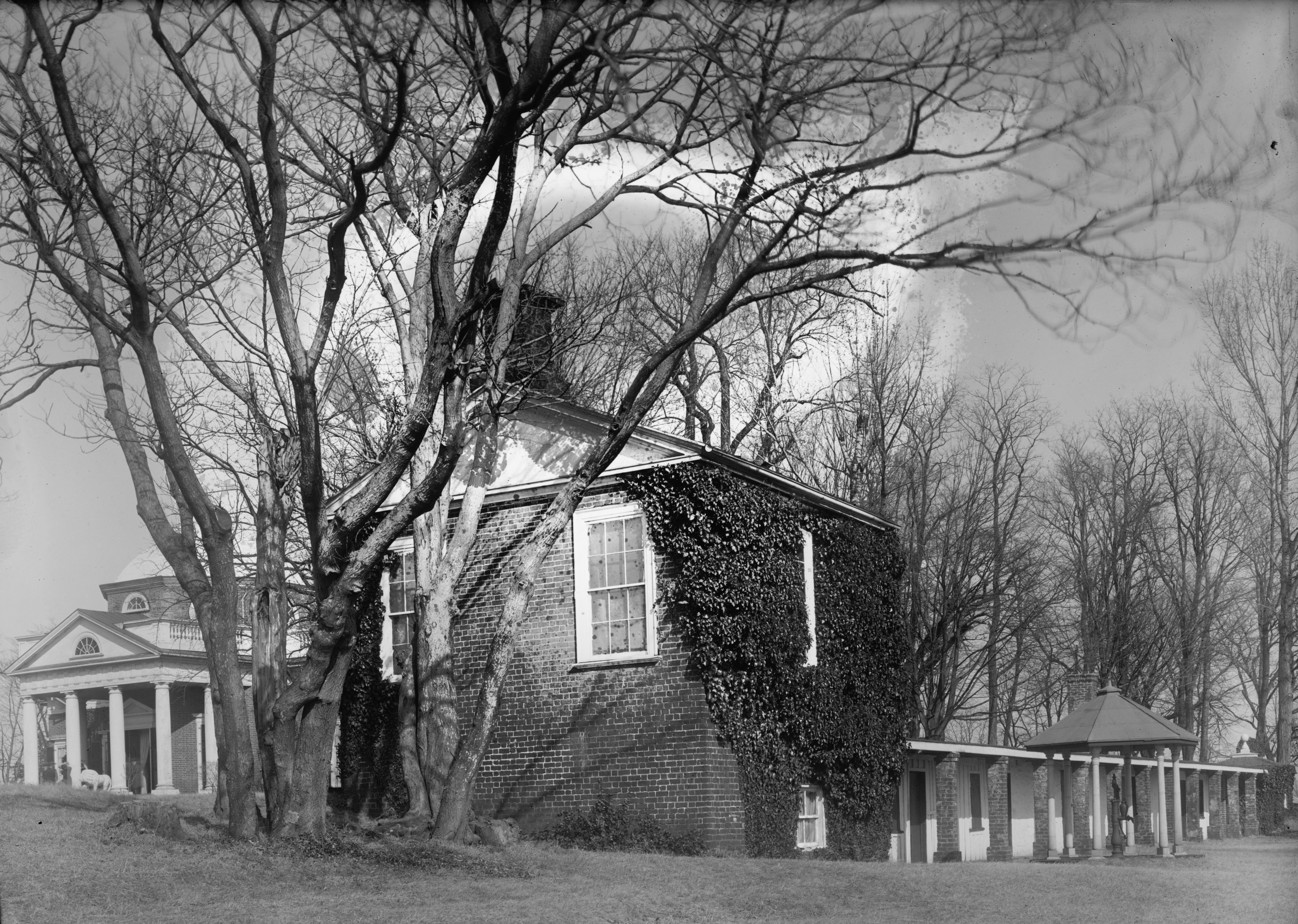
Monticello, showing the row of service rooms

Unlike most slaves who were field laborers, he learned to read and write and had less physically demanding work. He assisted his parents in their work and worked as a house servant, for which he sometimes received tips. Jefferson allowed children of slaves to be educated with his grandchildren, according to Fossett. Lewis Randolph, Jefferson's grandson, was his teacher.

His grandmother was Mary Hemings Bell, who lived in Charlottesville. She provided nicer clothes than other slaves received at Monticello. He was the great-grandson of Betty Hemings.

...we did not need to know that we were slaves. As a boy I was not only brought up differently, but dressed unlike the plantation boys. My grandmother was free, and I remember the first suit she gave me. It was of blue nankeen cloth, red morocco hat and red morocco shoes. To complete this unique costume, my father added a silver watch.

— Peter Fossett, quoted in New York World, January 30, 1898

== Slavery ==
Fossett was a slave at Monticello. Following Jefferson's death, an auction was held in January 1827 to sell Monticello's slaves. Peter, seven of his siblings, and his mother were put up for sale. His father was one of five people who had been freed by Jefferson in his will.

Born and reared as free, not knowing that I was a slave, then suddenly, at the death of Jefferson, put upon an auction block and sold to strangers.

— Peter Fossett

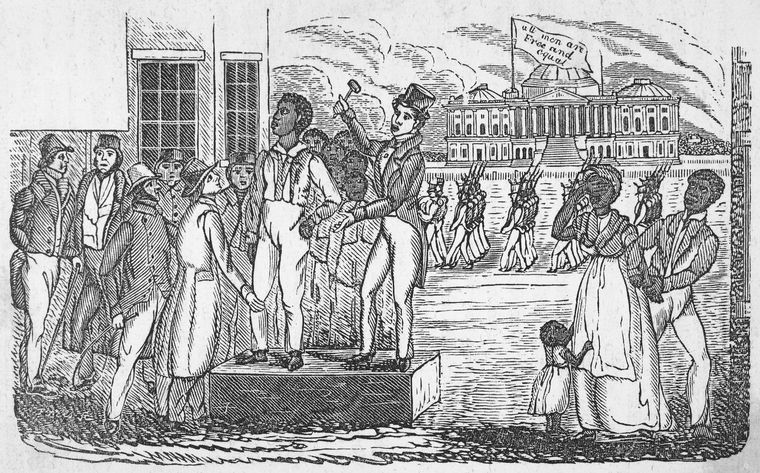
A slave auction

Eleven-year old Peter was put on the auction block, feeling like he was sold like a horse. He was purchased by Colonel John Jones who ran his plantation differently than Jefferson. At Monticello he had learned to read and write. Under threat of whippings, Peter continued these practices, and taught fellow slaves to read and write, but hid those activities. Catching Fossett reading a book once, Jones threw the book in the fire and said, "If I ever catch you with a book in your hands, thirty-and-nine lashes on your bare back." His father gave him a copy book so that he could write. Fossett forged papers for fugitive slaves so that it would appear that they were free.

Although Jones was brutal to Fossett, his wife considered him a member of the family. Mrs. Jones offered lodging to preachers of any faith who traveled through the area, who made an impression on Fossett. Jones also came to care for Fossett. He ran away two times from Jones' estate, but was recaptured both times. At the time, he felt like he was going to become a free man, or die trying. The second escape resulted in Fossett being taken to jail and then sold on the auction block. Joseph, who moved to Ohio about 1840, and moved to Cincinnati about 1843, made trips to Virginia to see his family. He worked to buy his family out of slavery, but Peter's owner, John Jones, would not sell him until the second time he escaped. He was put on the auction block in 1850. At age 35, he was purchased and freed through the efforts of his father, family, and Jefferson's friends. (Note: He may have attained his freedom in 1848.)

== Career and community activism ==
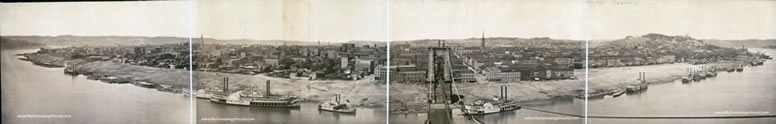
Panoramic view of Cincinnati, 1866

After he was freed, he moved to Cincinnati, Ohio to be with his family. He held several jobs when he first arrived in Ohio, he worked as a waiter for a caterer and was a whitewasher. He became a caterer, working with his brother William and in the 1870s he opened his own catering business. His clients were among the elite of Cincinnati. Ohio History Center states: "There is reason to believe that he excelled at French cooking, as his mother received extensive training in this form of food preparation while a slave at Monticello."

He was a conductor on the Underground Railroad, supporting the efforts of Levi Coffin, who commended him for his "zealous efforts" to aid people to freedom. Coffin was known as "president of the Underground Railroad" for his efforts. Although Ohio was not a slave state, the Underground Railroad led many to Canada to be safer from capture and some stayed in Ohio in African-American communities. Conductors risked their lives when they brought fugitive slaves into their homes and helped them to the next stop on the railroad. John Parker brought people across the Ohio River by boat.

Fossett lobbied for prison reform and sat on the school system's board of directors. The school system was segregated at that time.

When he arrived in Cincinnati, Fossett joined the Union Baptist Church and was a trustee and clerk. He was ordained as a minister in 1870 and formed his own church, the construction of which was paid in large part by Fossett. He was a pastor for 25 years of that church, which came to be called the First Baptist Church in Cumminsville, Ohio. He was a pastor in total for 32 years. He ministered to African-American people across the country.

He is held in great regard by colored people and is loved by all the white ministers of Cincinnati, who know him well and esteem him highly.

— New York World, January 30, 1898

He wrote his remembrances in the book Once the slave of Thomas Jefferson in 1898.

== Military ==
Captain Peter Fossett served with a unit of African Americans called the Black Brigade of Cincinnati. They built defences for the city along the Ohio River during the Civil War (1861–1865).

== Marriage and children ==
Fossett married Sarah Mayrant, who was born in Charleston, South Carolina in 1826. Her parents were Judith and Rufus Morant (or Mayrant). Abraham Evan Gwynne, the father of Alice Claypoole Vanderbilt (1845 – 1934), brought Sarah to Cincinnati, where she was introduced to wealthy elite members of Cincinnati society. As a young girl, she was trained to care for hair by a French specialist in New Orleans. When she came to Cincinnati, she was a hairdresser for wealthy white women. "Through their influence she secured entry in its exclusive group and had no superior in her profession," as quoted in The History of Black Business in America.

She arrived in Cincinnati by 1854 when she married Peter Fossett. Like her husband, she was active in the community, including the First Baptist Church of Cumminsville, orphanages in Cincinnati, and assisting enslaved people on the Underground Railroad. She was the manager of the Colored Orphan Asylum for more than 25 years. The Fossetts lived in a "comfortable, well furnished and well provided home" in Cincinnati. They had four children, only one of whom survived to adulthood. Their married daughter's name was Martha "Mattie" E. Kelly.

In 1860 she protested when she was not allowed to board a streetcar in 1860, and her efforts led to African-American women being allowed to ride Cincinnati's streetcars. When a white conductor did not allow her to ride the streetcar, (Note: She paid her fare and boarded the streetcar, but was forcibly removed. The conductor was charged with assault and battery.) she sued the streetcar company and won a favorable ruling. It was several years before African-American men were allowed to ride the city's streetcars. (Note: Her name was misspelled as "Fawcett" in court documents.) Fossett died in December 1906.

== Death ==
In 1900, believing that he was not going to live much longer, he traveled to Monticello with the help of friends, where he was allowed to stay as long as he wished. Fossett said it had seemed like an "earthly paradise" in his boyhood. After two weeks of an age-related illness, Fossett died in early January 1901. He was believed to be the last surviving enslaved person from Monticello.

== See also ==
- National Underground Railroad Freedom Center, Cincinnati
