= Powhatan Beaty =

United States Army Medal of Honor recipient (1837-1916)

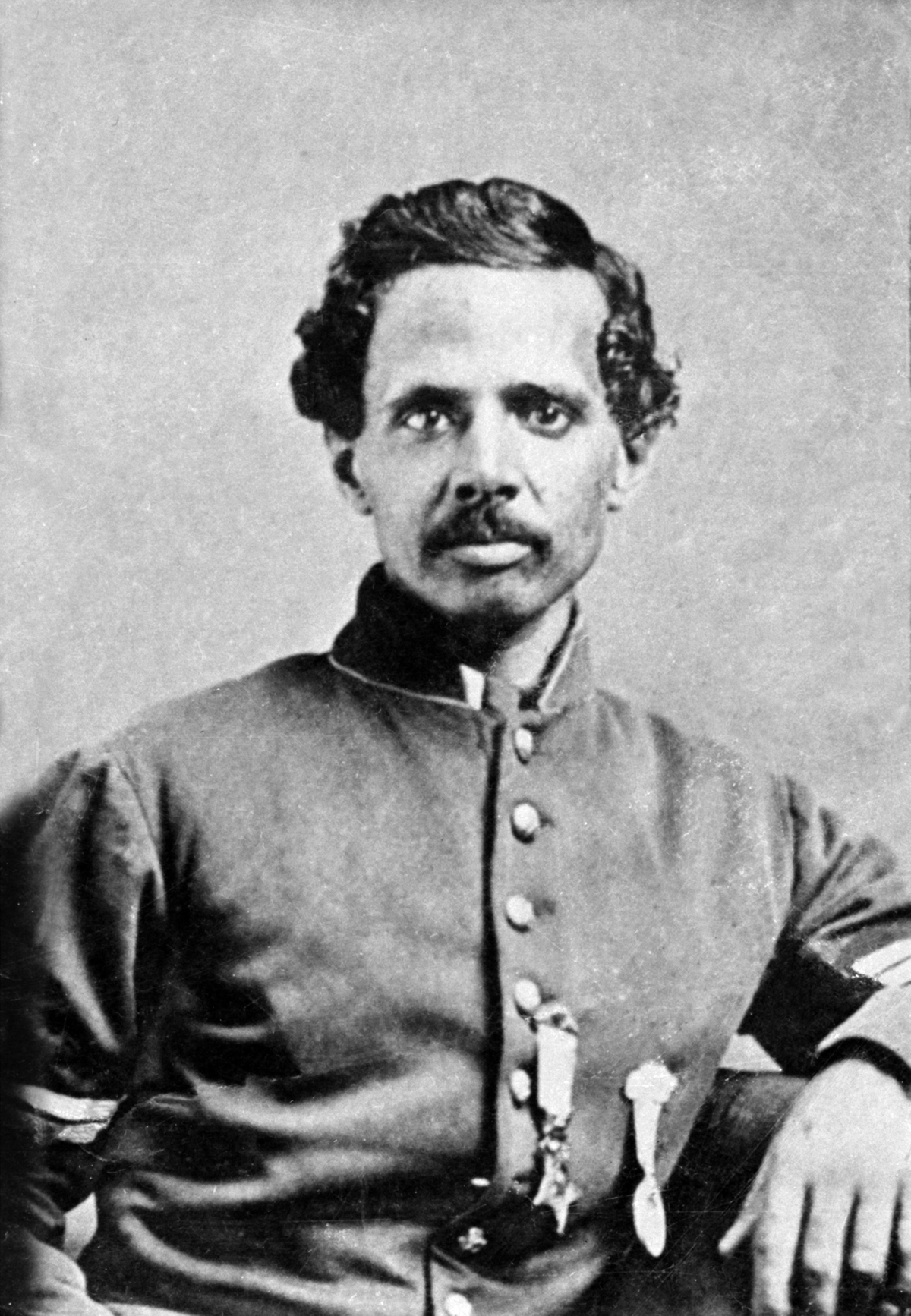
- First Sergeant Powhatan Beaty, of the 5th United States Colored Infantry Regiment, who was awarded the Medal of Honor, for taking command of his company at the Battle of Chaffin's Farm, after all officers had been killed and/or wounded.
- Born: October 8, 1837; Richmond, Virginia
- Died: December 6, 1916 (aged 79); Cincinnati, Ohio
- Burial place: Union Baptist Cemetery, Cincinnati, Ohio
- Military career
- Allegiance: United States of America; Union
- Branch: United States Army; Union Army
- Service years: 1863–1865
- Rank: First Sergeant
- Unit: 5th Regiment United States Colored Troops
- Conflicts: American Civil War Battle of Chaffin's Farm Battle of Fair Oaks & Darbytown Road
- Awards: Medal of Honor
- Other work: Actor

Powhatan Beaty (October 8, 1837 – December 6, 1916) was an African American soldier and actor. During the American Civil War, he served in the Union Army's 5th United States Colored Infantry Regiment throughout the Richmond–Petersburg Campaign. He received America's highest military decoration, the Medal of Honor, for taking command of his company at the Battle of Chaffin's Farm, after all officers had been killed or wounded.

Following the war, he became an orator and actor, appearing in amateur theater productions in his home of Cincinnati, Ohio. His most well-known stage performance was an 1884 appearance at Ford's Opera House on 9th Street in Washington, D.C., opposite Henrietta Vinton Davis.

== Early life ==
Beaty was born into slavery on October 8, 1837, in Richmond, Virginia. He moved to Cincinnati, Ohio, in 1849, where he received an education. He gained his freedom sometime on or before April 19, 1861; the exact date is unknown and may have been before his move to Ohio. While in school, he developed an interest in theater and made his public acting debut at a school concert. After leaving school, he was apprenticed to a black cabinet maker and eventually worked as a turner. He continued to study acting privately and received training in the field from several coaches, including James E. Murdock, a retired professional stage actor from Philadelphia.

A year after the outbreak of the Civil War, with the Confederate victory at the Battle of Richmond, Kentucky, on August 30, 1862, rumors of an impending Confederate attack on Cincinnati began to circulate.

Richmond was 106 miles from Cincinnati, and no organized Union troops lay between the two cities. An attack by Confederate Colonel John Hunt Morgan, who had led his cavalry on a raid behind Union lines in Kentucky the previous month, was also feared. On September 2, the men of Cincinnati were organized into work units to build fortifications around the city.

Although Cincinnati's African Americans were initially pressed into service at bayonet point, after the appointment of William Dickson as commander of the black troops their treatment improved significantly. Dickson promised that they would be treated fairly and kept together as a distinct unit, to be called the Black Brigade. He then allowed them to return home to prepare for military service, with orders to report the next morning for duty. About four hundred men were released that day, September 4, and the next morning about seven hundred reported for duty. Among those men was Beaty, who served in Company Number 1 of the Brigade's 3rd Regiment. Despite the danger of Confederate attack, the unarmed unit was assigned to build defenses near the Licking River in Kentucky, far in advance of the Union lines. For the next fifteen days, they cleared forests, constructed forts, magazines and roads, and dug trenches and rifle pits. The brigade was disbanded on September 20, the threat of attack having receded.

== United States Colored Troops service ==
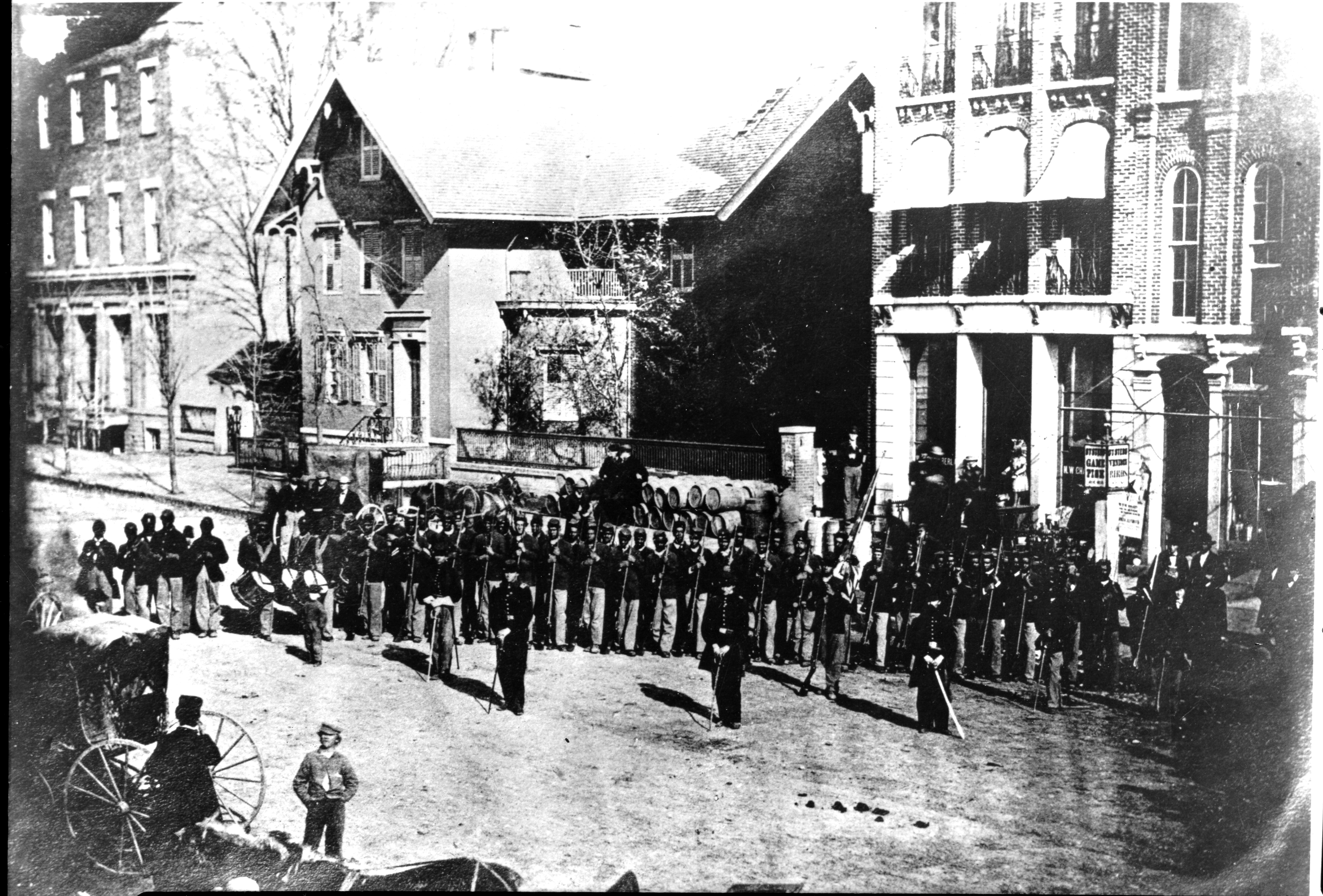
A portion of the 127th Ohio Volunteer Infantry, later re-designated the 5th USCT, in Delaware, Ohio

By June 1863, Ohio had not yet fielded an African American combat unit, but Ohio blacks were being recruited for service in the regiments of other states. Beaty enlisted from Cincinnati on June 7, 1863 for a three-year term of service in the Union Army; he was among a group of men recruited for a Massachusetts regiment. He joined as a private but was promoted to sergeant only two days later. He was placed in charge of a squad of forty-seven other recruits and ordered to report to Columbus, Ohio, from where they would be sent to Boston. Upon arriving in Columbus on June 15, however, they learned that the Massachusetts regiments were full and unable to accept their service. The Governor of Ohio, David Tod, immediately requested permission from the Department of War to form an Ohio regiment of African Americans. Permission was granted, and on June 17, Beaty and his squad became the first members of the 127th Ohio Volunteer Infantry, later re-designated the 5th United States Colored Troops. After three months of recruitment and organization in Camp Delaware, on the Olentangy River outside of Delaware, Ohio, the unit set out for Virginia.

By the Battle of Chaffin's Farm on September 29, 1864, Beaty had risen to the rank of first sergeant in Company G. His regiment was among a division of black troops assigned to attack the center of the Confederate defenses at New Market Heights. The defenses consisted of two lines of abatis and one line of palisades manned by Brigadier General John Gregg's Texas Brigade. The attack was met with intense Confederate fire and was turned back after reaching a line of abatis. During the retreat, Company G's color bearer was killed; Beaty returned through about 600 yards of enemy fire to retrieve the flag and return it to the company lines. The regiment had suffered severe casualties in the failed charge. Of Company G's eight officers and eighty-three enlisted men who entered the battle, only sixteen enlisted men, including Beaty, survived the attack unwounded. With no officers remaining, Beaty took command of the company and led it through a second charge at the Confederate lines. The second attack successfully drove the Confederates from their fortified positions, at the cost of three more men from Company G. By the end of the battle, over fifty percent of the black division had been killed, captured, or wounded. For his actions, Beaty was commended on the battlefield by General Benjamin Butler and seven months later, on April 6, 1865, awarded the Medal of Honor.

Beaty continued to distinguish himself in the 5th Regiment's further engagements. His actions during the Battle of Fair Oaks & Darbytown Road in October 1864 earned him a mention in the general orders to the Army of the Potomac. The regimental commander, Colonel Giles Shurtleff, twice recommended him for a promotion to commissioned officer. Nothing came of Colonel Shurtleff's requests, however Beaty did receive a brevet promotion to lieutenant. By the time he was mustered out of the Army he had participated in thirteen battles and numerous skirmishes.

== Post-war life ==
After the war, Beaty returned to Cincinnati and raised his family. His son, A. Lee Beaty, became an Ohio state legislator and an assistant U.S. District Attorney for southern Ohio. He resumed his career as a turner and pursued amateur acting and public speaking engagements. He gave public readings for charitable causes and became a well-known elocutionist among the African American community of Cincinnati. Through the 1870s he acted in local theaters and directed music and drama exhibitions in the city. He wrote a play about a rich southern planter entitled Delmar, or Scenes in Southland, which was performed in January 1881 with himself in the lead role. Set in Kentucky, Mississippi, and Massachusetts, the work covered the end of slavery and transition to freedom for blacks from 1860 to 1875. The privately run play was well received, but Beaty did not engage in self-promotion and it never moved into public theaters.

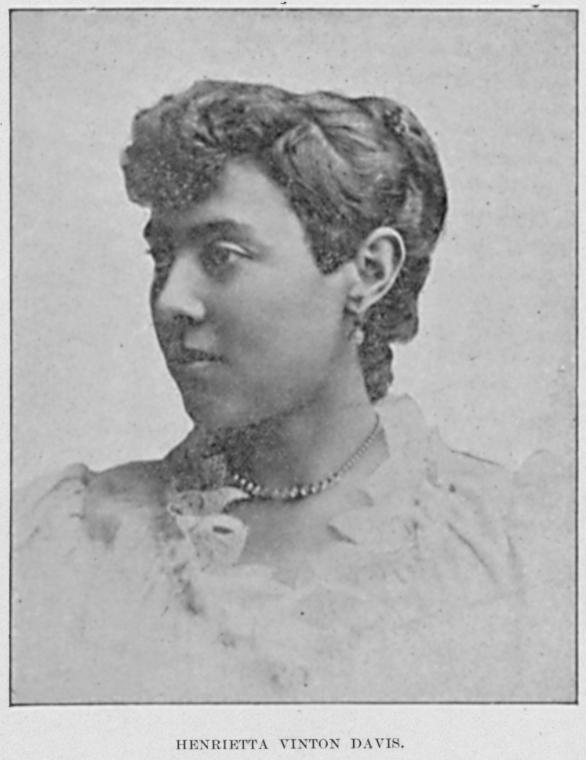
Henrietta Vinton Davis

In January 1884, Beaty was working as an assistant engineer at the Cincinnati water works when Henrietta Vinton Davis, a prominent African American actress, came to perform in the city. Together, he and Davis put on a large musical and dramatic festival in Melodeon Hall which proved to be very successful. Included in the show were productions of Ingomar, the Barbarian and Robert Montgomery Bird's The Gladiator, in which Beaty took the role of Spartacus. The culmination of the festival was a performance of selected scenes from Macbeth, with Beaty playing the title role and Davis as Lady Macbeth. Newspapers in both the black and white communities of Cincinnati praised the performances of the two actors, with the Commercial stating that Beaty "threw himself into his part with masterly energy and power".

The successful festival led to Beaty being invited to play as a principal actor in a Washington, D.C., Shakespearean production organized by Davis. A company including Davis, Beaty, and amateur actors from the D.C. area performed Richard III almost in entirety, three scenes from Macbeth, and one scene from Ingomar, the Barbarian. Davis, the premier black Shakespearean actress of the time, was the star of the show and Beaty played opposite her as Macbeth, King Henry VI, and Ingomar. The May 7, 1884, production was played in Ford's Opera House to a full house of more than 1,100 people; among them was Frederick Douglass. There was some heckling during the play, primarily from some of the white attendees, however a reviewer from The Washington Post reported that "the earnestness and intelligence of several of the leading performers were such as to command the respect of those most disposed to find cause for laughter in everything that was said or done". Washington newspapers praised the principal actors, but noted that the inexperience of some of the supporting cast was evident. Reviewers for African American newspapers were especially pleased to see such a production in an important venue like Ford's Theater. The New York Globe wrote of the performance "[t]hus leap by leap the colored man and woman encroach upon the ground so long held sacred by their white brother and sister".

Beaty continued to tour with Davis and performed a show in Philadelphia before returning to Cincinnati. He helped form his city's Literary and Dramatic Club and, in 1888, became the organization's drama director.

He lived out the rest of his life in Cincinnati and died at age seventy-nine on December 6, 1916; he was buried at Union Baptist Cemetery.

== Medal of Honor citation ==
Citation:

Took command of his company, all the officers having been killed or wounded, and gallantly led it.

== See also ==
- List of American Civil War Medal of Honor recipients: A–F
- Melvin Claxton and Mark Puls, Uncommon valor : a story of race, patriotism, and glory in the final battles of the Civil War, (Wiley, 2006) (ISBN 0471468231)
