= Albert Lee Beaty =

American politician (1869–1936)

Albert Lee Beaty (1869–1936) was a U.S. state legislator in Ohio. He served in the Ohio House of Representatives. A Republican, he represented Hamilton County, Ohio, for two consecutive terms from 1917 to 1920. He was the son of Powhatan Beaty.
