= James H. Bronson =

American soldier (1838–1884)

- Born: 1838; Indiana County, Pennsylvania, U.S.
- Died: March 16, 1884 (aged 45–46)
- Burial place: Chartiers Cemetery, Carnegie, Pennsylvania
- Military career
- Allegiance: United States of America; Union
- Branch: United States Army; Union Army
- Service years: 1863-1865
- Rank: First Sergeant
- Unit: 5th Regiment United States Colored Troops
- Conflicts: American Civil War; *Battle of Chaffin's Farm
- Awards: Medal of Honor

James H. Bronson (1838 – March 16, 1884) was an African American Union Army soldier during the American Civil War and a recipient of America's highest military decoration, the Medal of Honor.

== Biography ==
Bronson was born in Indiana County, Pennsylvania. In the 1860 census he was a resident of Weathersfield Township, (Trumbull County) OH and listed his occupation as that of a barber. His census record estimates his birth year as 1840. He enlisted in the Army from Trumbull County, Ohio, on August 3, 1863, at age 24 or 25. He joined as a private into Company D of the 5th U.S. Colored Infantry Regiment.

By the Battle of Chaffin's Farm on September 29, 1864, he had risen to the rank of first sergeant. Bronson's regiment was among a division of black troops assigned to attack the center of the Confederate defenses at New Market Heights. The defenses consisted of two lines of abatis, the first made up of felled trees and the second of chevaux de frise, followed by one line of palisades manned by Brigadier General John Gregg's Texas Brigade. The attack was met with intense Confederate fire and stalled after reaching a line of abatis. Many of the regiment's officers had been killed or wounded in the charge, including the regimental commander and all of Company D's officers. Bronson took command of Company D, rallied the men, and led a renewed attack against the Confederate lines. They successfully broke through the abatis and palisades and captured the Confederate positions after hand-to-hand combat with the defenders. For his actions during the battle, Bronson was awarded the Medal of Honor seven months later, on April 6, 1865.

After the end of the war, the 5th Regiment was stationed in North Carolina, where Bronson's service was marred by disciplinary problems. He was imprisoned at Fort Totten on June 20, 1865, for unknown reasons. He was again in custody, this time for desertion, a day before he and the rest of the 5th Regiment were mustered out on September 20, 1865, in Carolina City.

Bronson died at age 45 or 46 and was buried in Chartiers Cemetery, Carnegie, Pennsylvania.

== Medal of Honor citation ==
Rank and organization: First Sergeant, Company D, 5th U.S. Colored Troops. Place and date: At Chapins Farm, Va., September 29, 1864. Entered service at: Delaware County, Ohio. Birth: Indiana County, Pa. Date of issue: April 6, 1865.

Citation:

Took command of his company, all the officers having been killed or wounded, and gallantly led it.

== See also ==
- List of African American Medal of Honor recipients
- List of American Civil War Medal of Honor recipients: A–F
- Melvin Claxton and Mark Puls, Uncommon valor : a story of race, patriotism, and glory in the final battles of the Civil War, (Wiley, 2006) (ISBN 0471468231)
