= David Leroy Nickens =

Rev. David Leroy Nickens (1794–1838) was a freed slave who was born in Virginia. Nickens was the first African-American licensed minister in Ohio in July, 1824. He worked with abolitionists Theodore Weld and Augustus Wattles reforming education for black children in Chillicothe, Ohio.

Nickens was called as the first pastor of the Union Baptist Church in Cincinnati, which was established on July 21, 1831. Nickens died in Cincinnati in 1838 and is buried in the Union Baptist Cemetery in Price Hill, a Cincinnati neighborhood.

His wife, Serena, and children returned to Chillicothe and finished out their days there.
