= The Womenfolk =

American folk group

The Womenfolk were an American folk band from Los Angeles, California.

The Womenfolk were active from 1963 to 1966 and were signed to RCA Records during the folk revival boom of the 1960s. They released several albums, the most successful of which was their self-titled 1964 effort, which reached #118 on the Billboard 200.

The Womenfolk's version of "Little Boxes" was their only hit single, peaking at #83 in April 1964. It was at the time the shortest record (1:01) to make the Billboard Hot 100.

== Members ==
- Jean Amos
- Elaine Gealer
- Joyce James
- Leni Sorensen
- Babs Cooper
- Judy Fine
- Terry Harley

== Discography ==
- We Give a Hoot! (RCA Victor 2821, 1963)
- The Womenfolk (RCA Victor 2832, 1964)
- Never Underestimate the Power of The Womenfolk (RCA Victor 2919, 1964)
- The Womenfolk Live at the Hungry I (RCA Victor 2991, 1965)
- Man Oh Man! (RCA Victor 3527, 1966)
