= Pauline Powell Burns =

American painter and pianist (1872–1912)

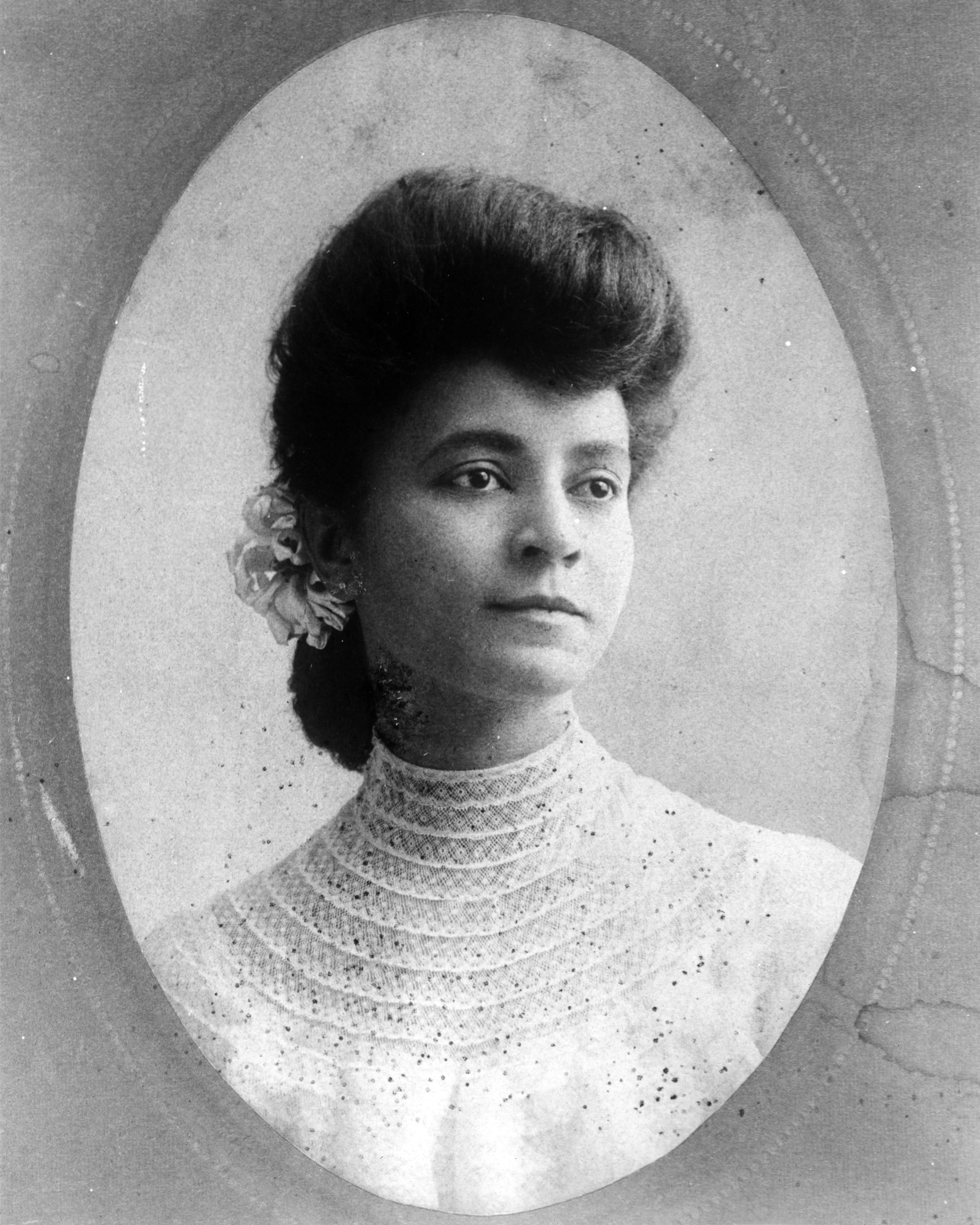
- Born: Pauline Powell; 1872; Oakland, California, U.S.
- Died: 1912 (aged 39–40)
- Occupations: artist, musician

Pauline Powell Burns (1872–1912) was an American painter and pianist. She was the first African-American artist to exhibit paintings in California, in 1890. Powell was also a pianist who gave recitals around the San Francisco Bay Area.

== Family history ==
Pauline Powell was born in 1872 in Oakland, California, to Josephine Turner, a schoolteacher and domestic worker, and her husband, William W. Powell, a railway porter.

Her great-grandfather was blacksmith Joseph Fossett, one of Thomas Jefferson's slaves who was freed by the terms of his will in 1826. Her maternal grandmother Isabella Fossett was also a slave and as a child was sold away from Monticello in 1827 as part of a settlement of estate debts, later escaping to Boston and eventually joining other family in Cincinnati.

Josephine and William Powell moved to Oakland, where their daughter Pauline was born in 1872, the year her grandmother Isabella died. Oakland had become a popular destination for African American families to settle after the completion of the Transcontinental Railroad which employed many African Americans as Pullman Porters and in other service roles. She was raised in Oakland's vibrant African-American community which by the late nineteenth century had "built a healthy network of commercial, educational and social institutions including churches, private schools, social clubs, music venues, real estate firms, insurance companies, funeral homes, and recreation centers," according to the Oakland Library.

On October 11, 1893, she married Edward E. Burns; they had no children.

On June 1, 1912, she died at the age of 40, of tuberculosis.

== Career ==
Powell showed early musical and artistic talent and studied both piano and painting. Although African-Americans were by then being admitted to the California School of Design, she appears to have been largely self-taught. She gave public piano recitals locally and at least once sang in a quartet in Los Angeles; she was praised by a Bay Area writer as “the bright musical star of her state.”

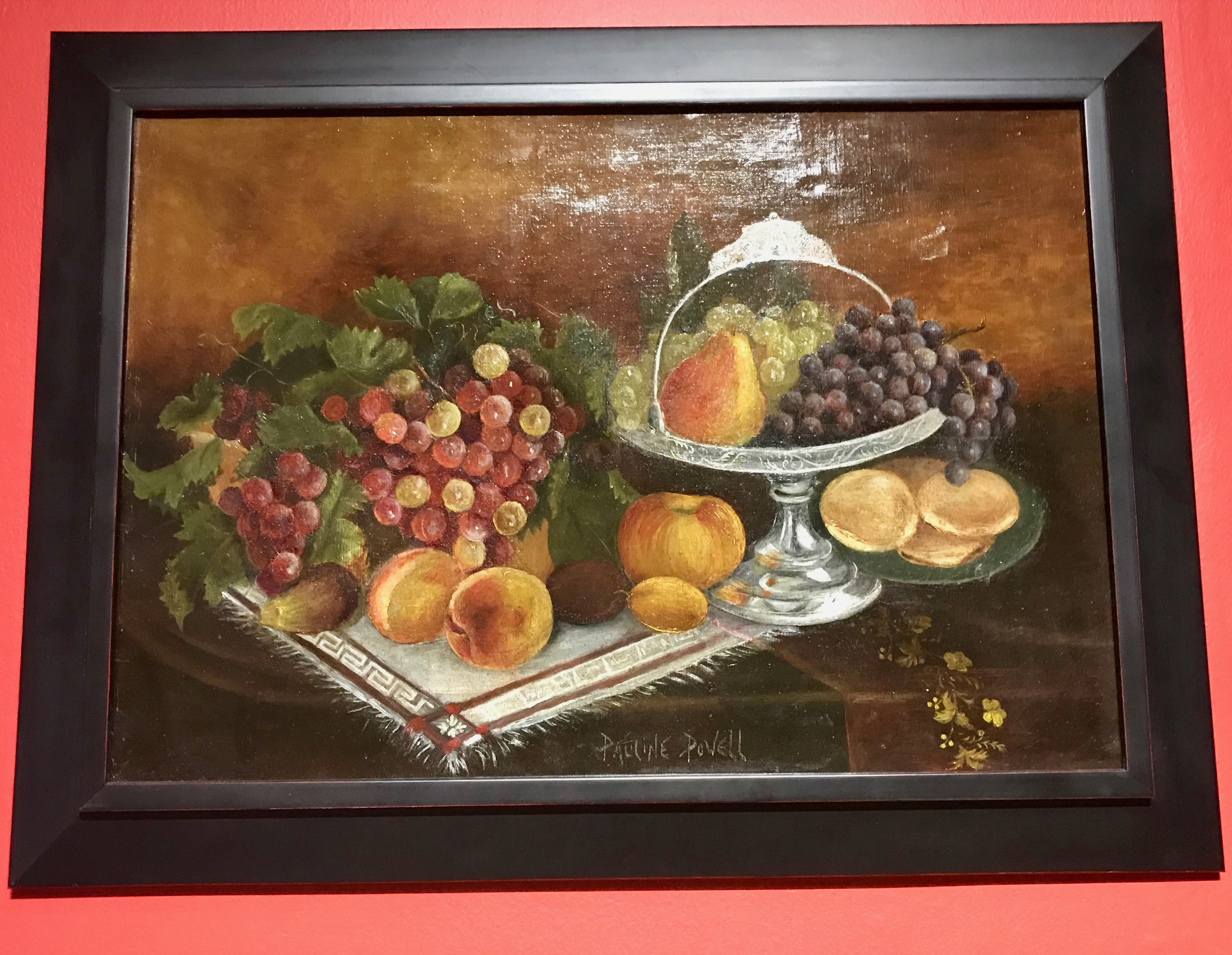
Still Life with Fruit circa 1890 by Pauline Powell Burns.

Powell is believed to have been the first African-American artist to exhibit anywhere in California. She apparently began showing her paintings at the age of 14, but her first known public exhibition was at the Mechanics' Institute Fair in San Francisco in 1890. Although her paintings at the fair received "great praise," she was then better recognized as a pianist and is listed in a 1919 history of African-Americans in California solely as a piano teacher.

Powell's artwork is scarce, partly because of when she lived but also because she died at a young age. She is known to have painted landscapes and still lifes; surviving works include Champagne and Oysters (ca. 1890), Bulldogs, Still Life With Fruit (1890), Violets (oil on card, 1890), and a pair of watercolors, one of nasturtiums and the other of tulips, both of which are in the collection of Dunsmuir House in Oakland, California. Violets is in the collection of the Smithsonian Institution's National Museum of African American History and Culture.

Some documents relating to Powell's life are held in the Archives of California Art.

== Public collections ==
- National Museum of African American History and Culture, Washington DC

== See also ==
- List of African-American visual artists
- List of 20th-century women artists
