= 5th United States Colored Infantry Regiment =

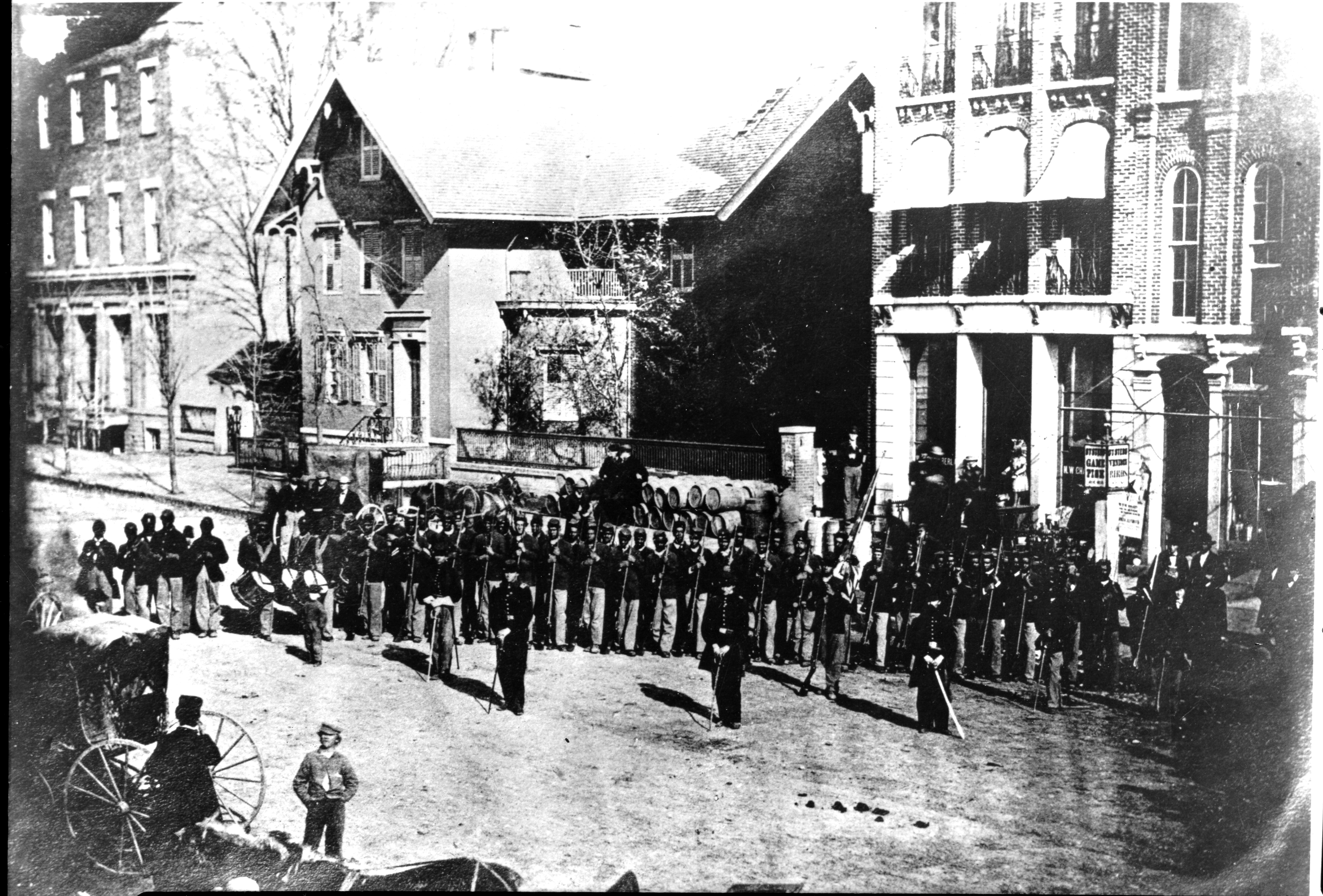
- A portion of the 127th Ohio Volunteer Infantry, later re-designated the 5th USCT, in Delaware, Ohio
- Active: August 1863 – September 20, 1865
- Country: United States
- Branch: Army
- Type: Infantry
- Part of: 2nd Brigade, XVIII Corps (January 1864 – April 1864); 2nd Brigade, Hincks' Colored Division, XVIII Corps, Army of the James (April 1864 – June 1864); 2nd Brigade, 3rd Division, XVIII Corps (June 1864 – December 1864); 3rd Brigade, 1st Division, XXV Corps (December 1864); 3rd Brigade, 3rd Division, XXV Corps (December 1864 – March 1865); 2nd Brigade, 3rd Division, X Corps (March 1865 – August 1865)
- Engagements: Battle of Sandy Swamp; Wistar's Expedition; Capture of City Point; Battle of Bailor's Farm; Richmond–Petersburg Campaign; Battle of Chaffin's Farm; Battle of Fort Harrison; Battle of Fair Oaks & Darbytown Road; First Battle of Fort Fisher; Second Battle of Fort Fisher; Battle of Sugar Loaf Hill; Battle of Federal Point; Battle of Wilmington; Battle of Goldsborough Bridge

Commanders
- Notable commanders: Col. Giles W. Shurtleff

Insignia
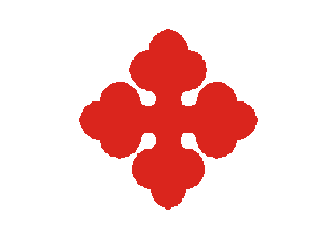
- XVIII Corps

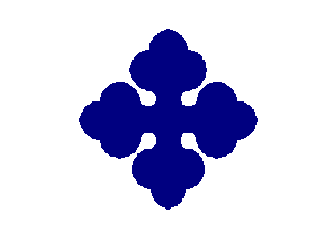
- 3rd Division, XVIII Corps

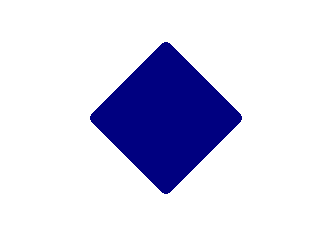
- 3rd Division, XXV Corps

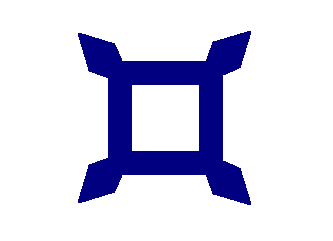
- 3rd Division, X Corps

The 5th United States Colored Infantry Regiment was an African American regiment of the Union Army during the American Civil War. A part of the United States Colored Troops, the regiment saw action in Virginia as part of the Richmond–Petersburg Campaign and in North Carolina, where it participated in the attacks on Fort Fisher and Wilmington and the Carolinas campaign.

== History ==
The regiment was formed as the 127th Ohio Infantry Regiment at Camp Delaware, Ohio. It was re-designated the 5th United States Colored Infantry Regiment, and moved to Norfolk, Virginia, in November 1863, immediately after three months of organization. It served at Norfolk and Portsmouth in the Department of Virginia and North Carolina until January 1864, during which time the unit participated in Brigadier General Edward A. Wild's expedition to South Mills and Camden Court House, North Carolina, from December 5 to December 24 and in action at Sandy Swamp, North Carolina, on December 8.

The regiment was then moved to Yorktown, Virginia, where it became part of the XVIII Corps and was involved in several expeditions: Wistar's Expedition against Richmond from February 6 to February 8, 1864, an expedition to New Kent Court House in aid of Brigadier General Hugh Judson Kilpatrick's cavalry from March 1 to March 4 (including action at New Kent Court House on March 2), an expedition into King and Queen County from March 9 to March 12, and an expedition into Mathews and Middlesex Counties from March 17 to March 21.

The regiment participated in the capture of City Point, Virginia, on May 4, 1864, and while in the city the regiment served fatigue duty, built Fort Converse on the Appomattox River, defended an attack against Fort Converse on May 20, and took part in Brigadier General Benjamin F. Butler's operations on the south side of the James River and against Petersburg and Richmond. The unit participated in action at Bailor's Farm on June 15, 1864, before taking part in the Richmond–Petersburg Campaign from June 16 to December 6, 1864. The regiment served in the trenches around Petersburg, seeing action there during the Battle of the Crater on July 30.

On August 28, 1864, the regiment moved to Deep Bottom in Henrico County, Virginia, and subsequently participated in the Battle of Chaffin's Farm and Fort Harrison from September 28 to September 30 and the Battle of Fair Oaks from October 27 to October 28 before returning to the trenches, this time near Richmond. Four men of the regiment received the Medal of Honor for their actions at Chaffin's Farm: Powhatan Beaty, James H. Bronson, Milton M. Holland, and Robert Pinn.

General Benjamin F. Butler remarked "[s]o far as the conduct of the color-sergeant, (Milton M.) Holland, was concerned, in the charge at New Market Heights, had it been within my power I would have conferred upon him in view of it, a brigadier-generalship for gallantry on the field."

In December the unit was assigned to the newly formed XXV Corps and took part in the failed attack on Fort Fisher, North Carolina, from December 7 to December 27, 1864, and the successful Second Battle of Fort Fisher from January 7 to January 15, 1865. The 5th then saw action at Sugar Loaf Hill on January 19 and at Federal Point on February 11 before taking part in the Battle of Wilmington at Fort Anderson from February 18 to February 20 and the capture of Wilmington as well as action at Northeast Ferry on February 22, 1865.

In March 1865, the regiment was reassigned to the X Corps and took part in General William Tecumseh Sherman's Carolinas campaign. The unit saw action during the advance on Kinston and Goldsboro, North Carolina, starting on March 6 and occupied Goldsboro after its capture on March 21. The regiment saw further action at Cox's Bridge on March 23 and March 24 and participated in the advance on Raleigh, North Carolina, starting on April 10 and the occupation of Raleigh after the city's fall on April 13. With the end of the war at hand, the men of the regiment witnessed the surrender of Confederate General Joseph E. Johnston and his army at Bennett Place, North Carolina, on April 26, 1865. The unit served out the rest of its term in Goldsboro, New Bern, and Carolina City, North Carolina.

The 5th United States Colored Infantry was mustered out on September 20, 1865, after two years of existence. The regiment lost a total of 249 men during its service; four officers and 77 enlisted men were killed or mortally wounded and two officers and 166 enlisted men died of disease.

== See also ==
- List of United States Colored Troops Civil War Units
