= Ann-Elizabeth Fossett Isaacs =

Enslaved woman, Monticello

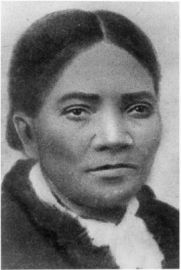
- Born: c. 1812; Monticello, Virginia
- Died: 1902; Ross County, Ohio
- Known for: Underground Railroad work
- Spouse: Tucker Issacs
- Relatives: William Monroe Trotter (grandson)

Ann-Elizabeth Fossett Isaacs (c. 1812-1902) was an African American woman who was born into slavery at Monticello, the plantation owned by then former president Thomas Jefferson. She lived there until she was around the age of fifteen with her mother, a cook, and her father, a blacksmith, along with their other nine children. She would later be sold to a new owner, and eventually gain freedom, and after moving around from Ohio and Charlottesville, would eventually settle in Ross County, Ohio. It was here that she and her family were able to play an integral part in the Underground Railroad.

== Early life ==
Ann-Elizabeth was the daughter of Edith Hern Fossett and Joseph Fossett, and their fourth child out of ten total. Edith was a chef at Monticello, who also worked at the White House while Jefferson held office. Joseph acted as the plantation’s chief blacksmith for twenty years, and was able to keep one sixth of the profits that were generated at his shop, a rarity for enslaved people at Monticello.

Little is known of Fossett Isaacs exact role at Monticello, however it was typical for enslaved children there to take care of the younger enslaved children and perform tasks in the house until the age of ten. After this, they would then work in the textile shops, the fields, or remain in the house. It was not until turning sixteen that they would be seen as a full worker, which Ann-Elizabeth would turn after leaving Monticello.

== After Monticello ==
Shortly after Thomas Jefferson’s death, Ann-Elizabeth, along with her mother and six of her siblings, were auctioned off in 1827 due to unsettled debts from Jefferson. She was later set free due to her father in 1837. At the time of her emancipation, Fossett had married a man from Charlottesville of African and Jewish descent by the name of Tucker Issacs. The pair moved to Ohio with their children and others of the Fossett family after gaining freedom. They would eventually move back to Charlottesville for some time, as they both had family there, some of whom were still enslaved. This was followed by another, and this time permanent, move to Ohio for the family.

== Significance ==
In her final residency in Ohio, Ann-Elizabeth and her husband resided in Ross County, Ohio on a 158-acre farm. This farm was notable for its use as a stop in the Underground Railroad. It allowed many escaped slaves an opportunity of safety during a very trying time. The acreage was continually used as a station in the Underground Railroad by the descendants of the Isaacs. The two had nine children, one of whom was the mother of civil rights leader William Monroe Trotter.
