= Leni Sorensen =

American chef and culinary historian

- Born: 1942 (age 83–84); San Diego, California
- Education: College of William and Mary
- Occupations: Historian, chef
- Television: High on the Hog: How African American Cuisine Transformed America

Leni Ashmore Sorensen is an American chef and culinary historian. She focuses on the lives of Black cooks, with a particular emphasis on the early 1800s and the Colonial period. She is featured on the Netflix television series, High on the Hog: How African American Cuisine Transformed America.

== Early life ==
Sorensen was born in Los Angeles in 1942. Her mother Lisa, a Communist who later joined the Unitarian Church, was white. Her father, Billy, was black; his grandfather was enslaved. Her stepfather, a Black man from New Orleans, sparked her interest in cuisine, and taught her how to cook Southern Creole staples. She was the first of three generations of interracial children.

Sorensen completed a BA in history in 1992 through the Mary Baldwin College Adult Degree Program, after having left high school at 16 play guitar and sing with folk group, The Womenfolk. She went on to earn her master's in 1997 and her Ph.D. in American Studies in 2005 from the College of William and Mary.

== Career ==
The Womenfolk recorded five albums and appeared on the Ed Sullivan Show three times; their cover of "Little Boxes" was on the Billboard Top 100 for three weeks. Her first child was born when she was 18. She began to host dinner parties and teach cooking classes in the early 1970s.

In 1974 Sorensen described herself in a personal ad in Mother Earth News as "31, Black, tall (5’9”) and sorta freaky for around here. I'm a hell of a good cook and am skilled at gardening, canning, raising rabbits, sewing and minor carpentry (have also begun to handspin wool) so favor a man with a country lifestyle over a city-minded dude.” That ad led to her marriage to Kip Sorensen, a carpenter and farmer from South Dakota, which lasted until his death in 2017.

Her career before retirement included time as a food historian specializing in African-American foods at Monticello, Thomas Jefferson's home, and working as a costumed interpreter at Colonial Williamsburg, where she "demonstrated how to dye cloth with indigo, spin wool and cook over a hearth". She operates Indigo House, a five-acre farmstead in the Blue Ridge Mountains where she teaches classes in canning and presents group dinners prepared from historic recipes. Her research focuses on the lives of Black cooks, with a particular emphasis on the early 1800s and the Colonial period. She is a co-presenter on the Netflix television series, High on the Hog: How African American Cuisine Transformed America.
