= Union Baptist Church (Cincinnati, Ohio) =

Church in the United States

The Union Baptist Church is Cincinnati's oldest black church. The church was founded on July 14, 1831. They had their first meeting in a building on Third Street, between Elm and Plum Streets, downtown. The members built a church on Central Avenue and called Rev. David Leroy Nickens of Chillicothe, Ohio as its first pastor. By the end of its first decade, the church had grown sufficiently to require a new building and by 1839, moved to a new location on Baker Street, where they remained for twenty-five years. Nickens was succeeded by Rev. Charles Satchell in 1838, who in turn was succeeded by William P. Newman in 1848. When Newman fled to Canada because of the passage of the Fugitive Slave Act of 1850, he was succeeded by Rev. Henry Adams, who served until 1855; Rev. H. L. Simpson, who served until 1858; and Rev. H. H. White who served three years. William Newman returned in 1864, serving until his death in the 1866 cholera epidemic. Simpson returned to fill the vacancy, serving until 1869, when he was succeeded by Rev. James H. Magee.

In 1864, Church members founded the Union Baptist Cemetery, in the Price Hill neighborhood. It is the oldest Baptist African-American cemetery in Cincinnati.

In the 1960s, urban renewal forced the church to move from its longtime home at Richmond and Mound Streets. The Church moved to Seventh & Central Avenues in 1971, under the leadership of Rev. Wilber Page, longtime pastor. The church continues its work in the Cincinnati community.
