= Thomas Mann Randolph Sr. =

American politician (1741–1793)

Member of the Virginia Senate for Goochland, Henrico and Louisa Counties
- In office October 17, 1791 – November 13. 1793
- Preceded by: Turner Southall
- Succeeded by: Samuel McCraw

Member of the Virginia House of Delegates for Goochland County, Virginia
- In office June 23, 1788 – October 18, 1789 Serving with John Guerrant
- Preceded by: John Payne
- Succeeded by: Thomas Underwood
- In office May 5, 1783 – October 14, 1787 Serving with Thomas Underwood
- Preceded by: John Payne
- Succeeded by: John Guerrant
- In office May 1, 1780 – May 6, 1781 Serving with Stephen Sampson
- Preceded by: Thomas Underwood
- Succeeded by: John Woodson

Member of the Virginia Senate for Goochland, Henrico and Louisa Counties
- In office October 7, 1776 – May 3, 1778
- Preceded by: position created
- Succeeded by: Richard Adams

Member of the Virginia House of Burgesses for Goochland County, Virginia
- In office 1769–1775 Serving with John Woodson
- Preceded by: Josias Payne
- Succeeded by: position eliminated

Personal details
- Born: Thomas Mann Randolph; 1741 Tuckahoe Plantation
- Died: November 13, 1793 (aged 51–52)
- Spouses: Anne Cary Randolph (m. 1761; died 1789) Gabriella Harvie (m. 1790)
- Children: 15, including: Mary Randolph; Thomas Mann Randolph Jr.; Judith Randolph; Ann Cary Randolph Morris; Virginia Randolph Cary
- Parent(s): William Randolph III; Maria Judith Page
- Relatives: Martha Jefferson Randolph (daughter-in-law, cousin); Thomas Randolph of Tuckahoe (paternal grandfather); Mann Page (maternal grandfather)

Thomas Mann Randolph Sr. (1741–November 13, 1793) was a Virginia planter and politician who served in the Virginia House of Burgesses, the Revolutionary conventions of 1775 and 1776, and both houses of the Virginia state legislature following the American Revolutionary War. Orphaned as a young boy, Randolph became the ward of Peter Jefferson before he inherited Tuckahoe plantation when he came of age. He was raised alongside future President Thomas Jefferson and later purchased Salisbury house, which Randolph used as a hunting lodge. He married twice and had 15 children, 13 with his first wife and cousin, Anne Cary.

== Early life ==
Coat of Arms of William Randolph

Randolph was the only son of William Randolph III (1712–1745) and Maria Judith Page (died 1744), the daughter of Mann Page of the Rosewell plantation. The Randolph family of Virginia were among the First Families of Virginia. He was the grandson of Thomas Randolph of Tuckahoe and descendant of William Randolph (c.1650–1711).

Randolph's parents were married in 1736 and her father provided a £2000 sterling dowry that was used to build an "elegant new two-story mansion. Maria Page Randolph died when this man was an infant, and his father in 1745. William Randolph stipulated in his will of late 1745 that he wanted his good friend Peter Jefferson and his first cousin and Peter's wife, Jane Randolph Jefferson, to take care of his son and two daughters at Tuckahoe Plantation and provide the children a good education until Thomas Mann Randolph came of age. Peter Jefferson also managed the plantation's business affairs.

The Jeffersons left their residence at Shadwell, Virginia, with their three daughters and son, Thomas Jefferson, in 1746. (Note: Thomas Jefferson's earliest memory, according to family lore, was said to be a two or three year old boy being held securely by a trusted slave while riding on horseback and cushioned on a pillow as he was transported from Shadwell to Tuckahoe.) Second cousins, Randolph and Thomas Jefferson were close during their childhood at Tuckahoe. The boys were tutored at Tuckahoe on English spelling, grammar, and composition. (Note: The site of Thomas Jefferson's earliest education, a bronze plaque which stated "Here the discipline of his noble mind began," which was installed at Tuckahoe by the Commonwealth Chapter of the Daughters of the American Revolution.) Thomas Jefferson maintained relationships with his Randolph family members, particularly the Randolphs at Tuckahoe. (Note: His daughter Martha Jefferson later married Thomas Mann Randolph's son Thomas Mann Randolph Jr.)

== Career ==
Like his father, upon coming of age Randolph operated Tuckahoe plantation using enslaved labor.

Goochland County voters first elected Randolph as one of their representatives to the House of Burgesses in 1769, and continued to re-elect him and veteran legislator John Woodson until Governor Dunmore suspended the legislature in 1775 (and members could not reach a quorum in 1776). They then elected the pair to all five Virginia Revolutionary Conventions.

during the Revolutionary War acquired the honorific "Colonel Randolph".

After Virginia declared is independence, voters from Goochland and neighboring Henrico and Louisa Counties elected Randolph to the first Virginia state senate in 1776, but Richard Adams replaced him in 1778, and he would not again win election to the Senate until 1791. In 1780, Randolph returned to the House of Delegates, as he replaced Thomas Underwood who became sheriff (a covered position for its tax-collection fees). He again won election to the house of Delegates in 1783, alongside Thomas Underwood, and the pair were re-elected until 1787, when John Guerrant replaced Randolph. After a year's absence, he replaced Underwood and served alongside Guerrantin 1788. Randolph had his last legislative service as a state senator for Goochland, Henrico and Louisa Counties between 1791 and won re-election in 1793 but died before the legislature convened and voters elected Samuel McCraw to fill the vacancy. He was a member of the House of Delegates from 1784 to 1788 and was County Lieutenant of Goochland County.

=== Salisbury house ===
In 1777, Thomas Mann Randolph Sr. purchased the Salisbury house from Abraham Salle (a Huguenot descendant of Abraham Salle (1670–ca. 1719)). The estate in Chesterfield County, Virginia (14 miles from Richmond, directly across the River from the Randolph-owned Tuckahoe) became a Randolph family hunting lodge. In 1784 Patrick Henry lived at Salisbury during his second term as Virginia governor (1784 to 1786).

== Marriages and children ==
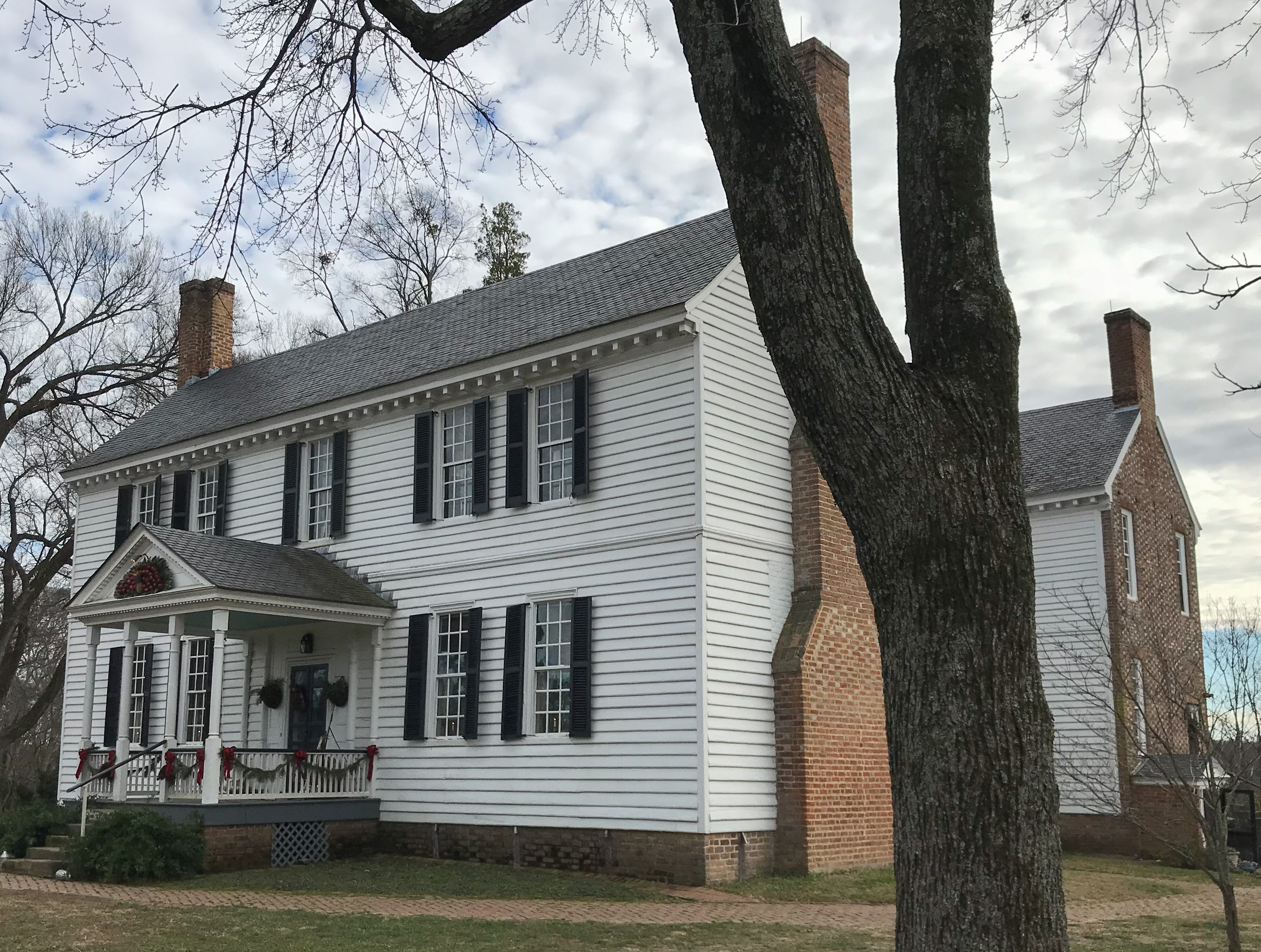
Tuckahoe Plantation - view of the Whole House.

In 1761, Thomas Mann Randolph Sr. married Anne Cary (1745–1789), the daughter of Archibald Cary and Mary Randolph Cary of Ampthill. (Note: Mary Randolph was the daughter of Richard Randolph and Jane Bolling Randolph.) Anne and Thomas were second cousins. He came of age in 1762. Randolph worked on construction of the mansion sometime between 1760 and 1765, perhaps partially funded by a dowry for his wife. The house came to have an h-shaped layout, with a north wing, hyphen, and a south wing. The mansion was built for a large family and entertaining. Construction was completed by 1769 when Englishman Thomas Anburey visited Tuckahoe. He wrote that the mansion

seems to be built solely to answer the purposes of hospitality... It is in the form of an H, and has the appearance of two houses, joined by a large saloon; each wing has two stories, and four large rooms on a floor; in one, the family reside, and the other is reserved solely for visitors.

Ann Cary and Thomas Mann Randolph had thirteen children, which include:

- Mary Randolph (1762–1828), married David Mead Randolph in 1780, she was the author of The Virginia House-Wife (1824)
- Henry Cary Randolph,(1764-1765), died as an infant
- Elizabeth Randolph,(b. 1765), married Robert Pleasants of Filmer about 1785
- Thomas Mann Randolph Jr. (1768-1828) an American planter, soldier, and politician, including Governor of Virginia. Married Martha Jefferson in 1790.
- William Randolph, (1770-1848, married Lucy Bolling, the daughter of Beverley Randolph about 1794
- Archibald Cary Randolph, (1771-1771), died an infant
- Judith Randolph, (1772-1816), married Richard Randolph of the Bizarre plantation and tried for the Bizarre Plantation scandal
- Ann Cary "Nancy" Randolph (1774–1837), wife of Gouverneur Morris. Nancy was harassed throughout her life because of an alleged unwed teenage pregnancy and subsequent suspicion of abortion that was detailed in a sensational murder trial at the time where she was defended by both John Marshall and Patrick Henry who secured her acquittal for lack of evidence. She later claimed a stillborn birth had occurred after a member of her own family relentlessly pursued her in the court of public opinion.
- Jane Cary Randolph, (1776-1832), married Thomas Eston Randolph of Bristol, England about 1797
- Dr. John Randolph, (1779-1834), married Judith Lewis
- George Washington Randolph, (1781-1783), died an infant
- Harriet Randolph, (1783-1869), married Richard S. Hackley of New York about 1803
- Virginia Randolph Cary (1786–1852), author of Letters on Female Character (1828)

Ann Cary Randolph died in 1789. In 1790, a few months after his first wife's death, the 49-year-old Thomas Mann Randolph Sr. married Gabriella Harvie, the daughter of John Harvie Jr. She was 17 years of age, and he was more than twice her age.

The children of Gabriella Harvie and Thomas Mann Randolph are:

- Mary Jane Randolph who died while an infant.
- Thomas Mann Randolph (1792–1848), was born before 1793 when Randolph died. This son had the same name as the son of his first wife which caused a great deal of division among the family.

The children from Randolph's first marriage did not visit Tuckahoe after the second marriage.

== Death ==
Randolph died on November 13, 1793. The second Thomas Mann Randolph, Gabriella's son, inherited Tuckahoe. After Randolph's death, Gabriella married Dr. John Brockenbrough of Richmond by 1798.
