= Mary Randolph =

American author (1762–1828)

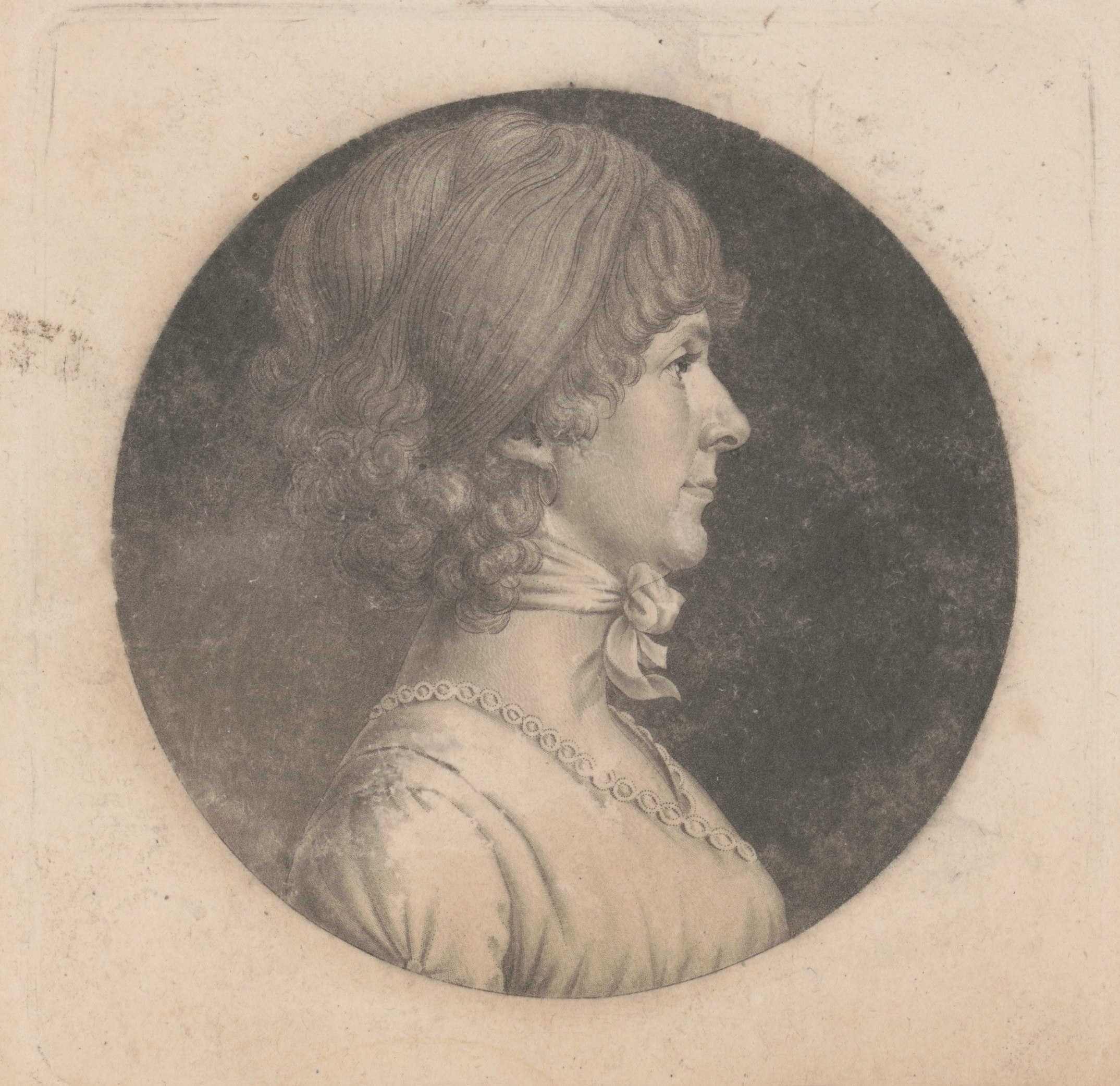
- 1807 engraving of Mary Randolph
- Born: August 9, 1762; Chesterfield County, Virginia
- Died: January 23, 1828 (aged 65); Washington, D.C., U.S.
- Resting place: Arlington National Cemetery
- Occupation: Writer
- Spouse: David Meade Randolph (m. 1780)
- Children: 4
- Parent(s): Thomas Mann Randolph Sr. Ann Cary Randolph
- Relatives: Thomas Mann Randolph Jr. (brother); Martha Jefferson Randolph (sister-in-law, cousin); Judith Randolph (sister); Virginia Randolph Cary (sister); Ann Cary Randolph Morris (sister)

Mary Randolph (August 9, 1762 – January 23, 1828) was a Southern American cook and writer, known for writing The Virginia House-Wife; Or, Methodical Cook (1824), one of the most influential housekeeping and cook books of the 19th century. Many of the recipes used local Virginia ingredients including Tanacetum vulgare virginia pudding, pickled nasturtiums and desserts with the native gooseberry. She was the first person known to be buried at what would become known as Arlington National Cemetery.

== Early life ==
Coat of Arms of William Randolph

Mary Randolph was born on August 9, 1762, at Ampthill Plantation in Chesterfield County, Virginia. Her parents were Thomas Mann Randolph Sr. (1741–1794) and Anne Cary Randolph (1745–1789). The extended Randolph family was one of the richest and most political significant families in 18th century Virginia.

Mary's father was orphaned at a young age and raised by Thomas Jefferson's parents who were distant cousins. Her father also served in the Virginia House of Burgesses, the Revolutionary conventions of 1775 and 1776, and the Virginia state legislature. Anne Cary Randolph was the daughter of Archibald Cary, an important Virginia planter. Anne's grandmother, Jane Bolling Randolph completed a cookbook manuscript in 1743 which was handed down to her daughter Jane Randolph Walke.

Mary Randolph was the oldest of Thomas and Anne's 13 children. Her brother Thomas Mann Randolph Jr. married Martha Jefferson (daughter of Thomas Jefferson) and became a Congressman and Governor of Virginia. One sister, Virginia Randolph Cary, was a noted essayist and another, Harriet, married Richard Shippey Hackley who became US Consul and they lived in Cadiz, Spain. She was probably the source of the Spanish recipes in Randolph's cookbook. Her sister, Ann Cary "Nancy" Randolph, was the wife of Gouverneur Morris and mother of Gouverneur Morris Jr. Ann figured in a scandal involving her brother-in-law and distant cousin, Richard Randolph of Bizarre, in which he was accused of "feloniously murdering a child said to be borne of Nancy [Ann] Randolph."

Randolph grew up at Tuckahoe Plantation in Goochland County, Virginia. The Randolphs were known to hire professional tutors to teach their children. Mary would likely have learned reading, writing, and arithmetic in addition to domestic skills.

== Marriage ==
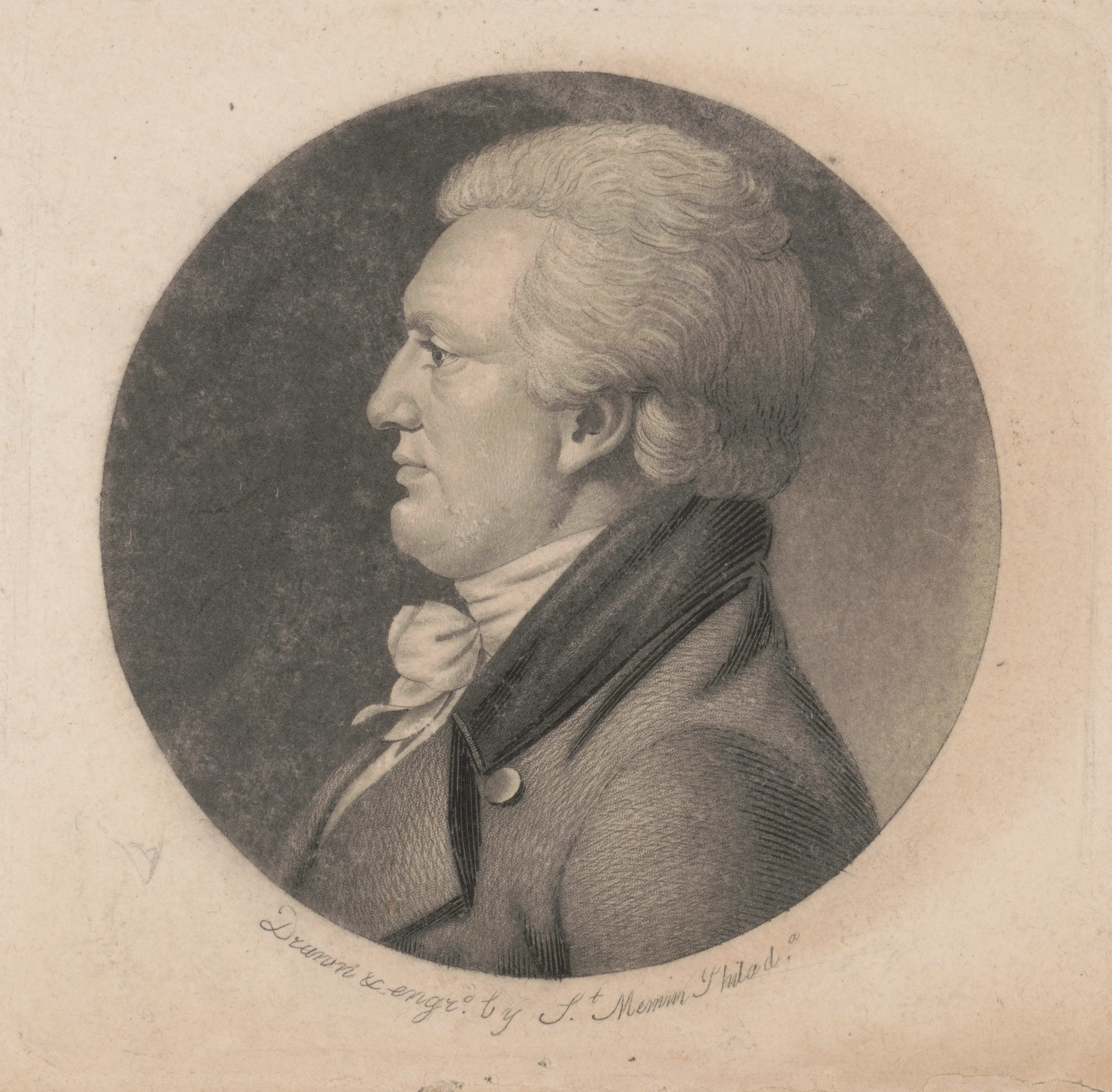
1807 engraving of David Meade Randolph

In December 1780, 18-year-old Mary Randolph married her first cousin once removed, David Meade Randolph (1760–1830), a Revolutionary War officer and tobacco planter. The newlyweds lived at Presquile, a 750-acre plantation that was part of the Randolph family's extensive property in Chesterfield County, Virginia. Over the course of their marriage, Mary and David had eight children, four of whom survived to adulthood.

Around 1795 President George Washington appointed David Randolph the U.S. Marshal of Virginia and by 1798, the family had moved to Richmond, where they built a mansion called "Moldavia" (a combination of Molly, a nickname for Mary, and David) at the corner of 5th and Main Streets. Mary Randolph was a celebrated hostess in Richmond.

David Randolph was a Federalist and an open critic of his second cousin Thomas Jefferson. After Jefferson's election to the presidency, he removed David Randolph from office and the family's fortunes declined.

== Boarding house ==
In 1807, Mary Randolph opened a boarding house in Richmond. In March 1808, an advertisement appeared in The Richmond Virginia Gazette: "Mrs. RANDOLPH Has established a Boarding House in Cary Street, for the accommodation of Ladies and Gentlemen. She has comfortable chambers, and a stable well supplied for a few Horses." David was in England during the 1810 census which listed Mary as the head of a Richmond household that included nine slaves.

In May 1815, Harriott Pinckney Horry spent a few days at the Randolph's boardinghouse and described Randolph's refrigerator in her journal. Inside a 4 by 3 1/2 foot box there was another box four inches smaller. The space between the two was packed with powdered charcoal and the refrigerator was filled with ice daily to cool butter, meat and other foods. In the 1825 2nd edition of her cookbook, Randolph included sketches for a refrigerator and bath tub. Years later an author claimed (falsely) that Randolph invented the refrigerator and that her design was stolen and patented by a Yankee who stayed in her boardinghouse.

By 1819, the Randolphs had given up their boardinghouse and moved to Washington to live with their son William Beverly Randolph. While in Washington, Mary Randolph completed her cookbook and in 1824 The Virginia House-Wife was published.

== The Virginia House-Wife ==
Randolph's influential housekeeping book The Virginia House-Wife was first published in 1824 and it was republished at least nineteen times before the outbreak of the Civil War. The book was 225 pages long, included nearly 500 recipes, and resulted from Randolph's "practical experience as keeper of a large establishment, and perhaps in the hope of further augmenting the family income." The Virginia House-Wife is considered the first regional American cookbook.

The Virginia House-Wife was an overall household guide and in addition to recipes it also explained how to make soap, starch, blacking and cologne.

== Later years ==
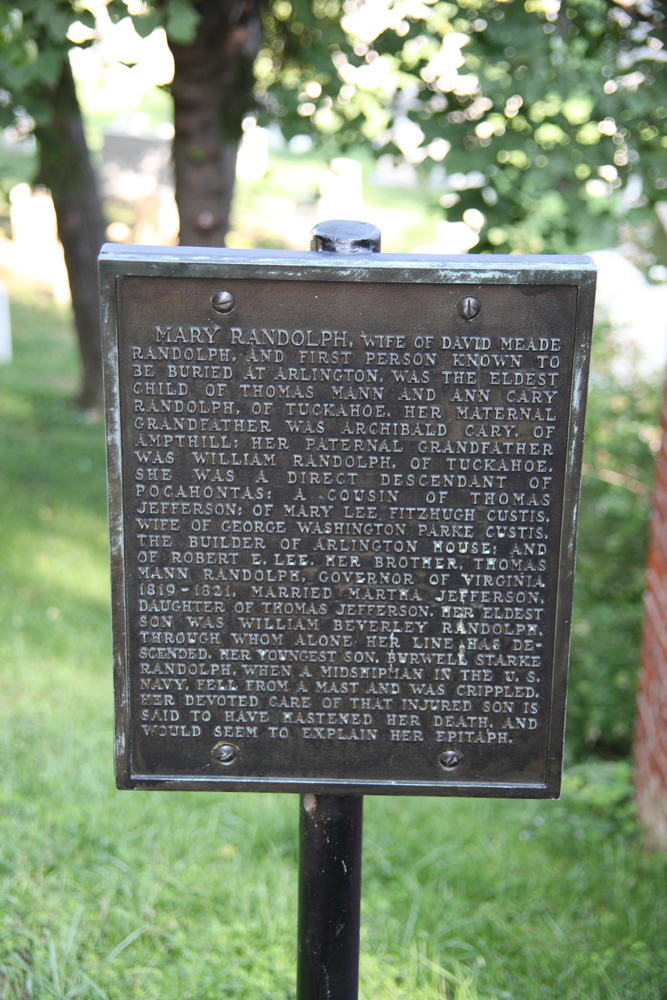
Marker over the grave of Mary Randolph at Arlington House, The Robert E. Lee Memorial, at Arlington National Cemetery.

Randolph spent the last years of her life caring for her son Burwell Starke Randolph, who had been disabled while serving in the Navy. Randolph was the first person known to be buried at what would become Arlington National Cemetery, at the home of her cousin George Washington Parke Custis, stepgrandson of George Washington and father of Mary Custis, wife of Robert E. Lee.

== Influence ==
Southern cookbooks similar to The Virginia House-Wife were published in the years that followed. Two of the most important were The Kentucky Housewife by Lettice Bryan (1839) and The Carolina Housewife by Sarah Rutledge (1847).

In 1982, James Beard praised Mary as "a far-seeing culinary genius" in The Richmond News Leader. He was particularly impressed by her use of tomatoes, writing "At a time when few people thought of tomatoes at all, she provided food recipes for tomato ketchup, tomato marmalade and tomato soy." According to culinary historian Andrew F. Smith, Randolph's wide range of tomato recipes "set the standard for tomato cookery over the next three decades."

In a 2014 essay for National Geographic, restaurateur José Andrés cited Mary Randolph as an influence. Andrés serves Randolph's gazpacho at his America Eats Tavern and believes that Randolph's "Gazpacho recipe demonstrates just how far back the notion of this country as a cultural melting pot goes."

== Honors ==
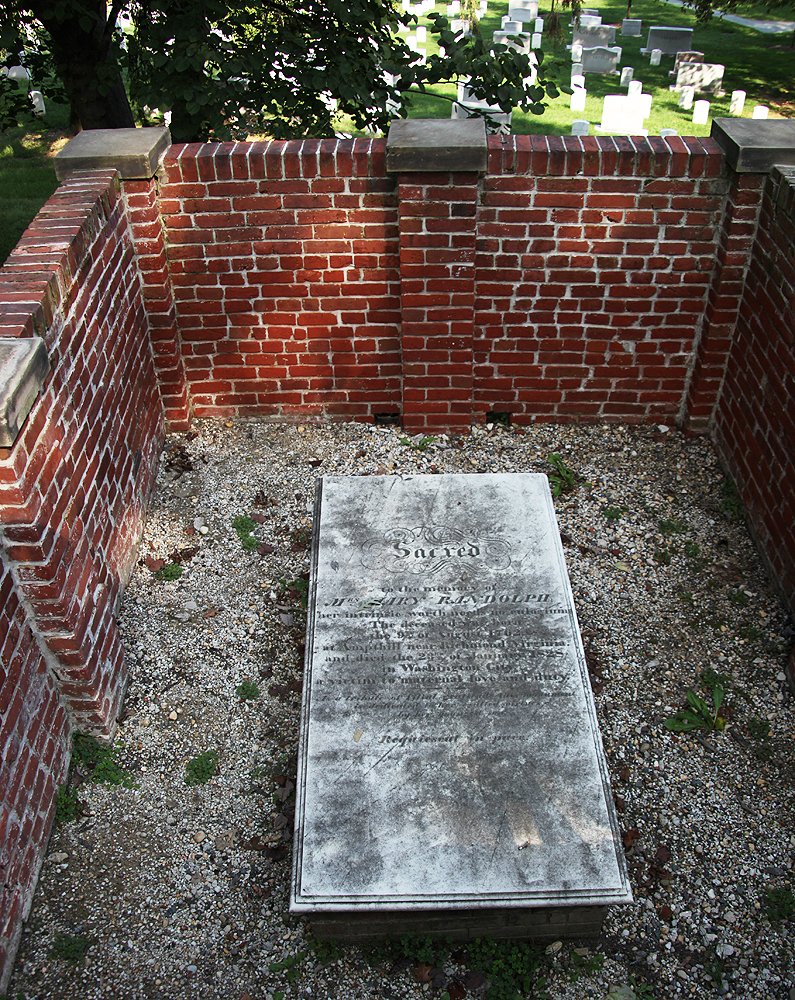
Grave of Mary Randolph at Arlington National Cemetery.

In 2009 Randolph was posthumously honored as one of the Library of Virginia's "Virginia Women in History". In 1999, the state of Virginia erected a historical marker in her honor near the site of her birth in Chesterfield County.
