= Ann Cary Randolph Morris =

American aristocrat (1774–1837)

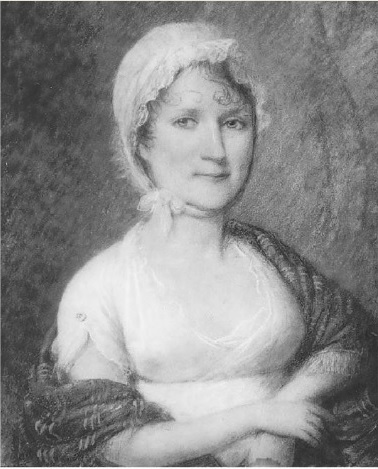
- Born: Ann Cary Randolph; September 16, 1774; Tuckahoe Plantation, Colony of Virginia, British America
- Died: May 28, 1837 (aged 62); Morrisania, New York, U.S.
- Spouse: Gouverneur Morris (m. 1809; died 1816)
- Children: Gouverneur Morris Jr.
- Parent(s): Thomas Mann Randolph Sr. Ann Cary Randolph
- Relatives: Mary Randolph (sister); Thomas Mann Randolph Jr. (brother); Martha Jefferson Randolph (sister-in-law, cousin); Judith Randolph (sister); Virginia Randolph Cary (sister)

Ann Cary Randolph Morris (September 16, 1774 – May 28, 1837) was the daughter of Thomas Mann Randolph Sr. and the wife of Gouverneur Morris. Books have been written about the scandal in which she was embroiled in central Virginia as a young woman after the death of her fiancé. After she married Gouverneur Morris in New York, she regained much of her favorable social prominence until he died in 1816. She was devoted to their son, Gouverneur Morris Jr. (1813–1888), whom she called her "richest treasure.” They lived at Morrisania (in what is now the Bronx). He had the St. Ann's Episcopal Church in Bronx built in her memory.

== Early life ==
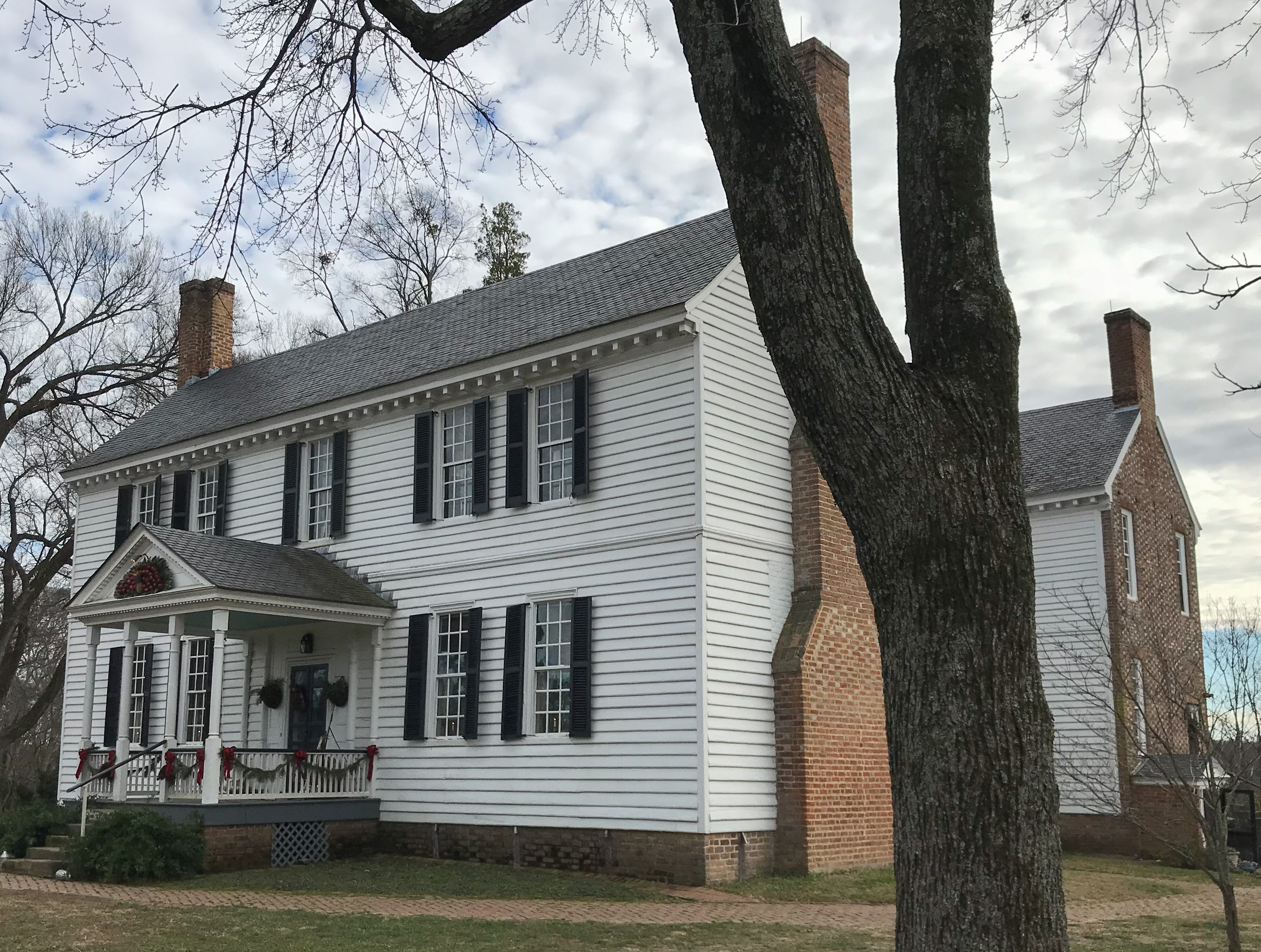
Tuckahoe Plantation, the birthplace and childhood home of Ann Cary Randolph Morris.

Ann Cary Randolph was born near Richmond, Virginia, on the Tuckahoe Plantation. Her parents were Thomas Mann Randolph Sr. and Ann Cary Randolph, and she had twelve siblings. The aristocratic, plantation-owning Randolph family of Virginia, descended from William Randolph of Turkey Island, Virginia, and often intermarried among the First Families of Virginia.

[Tuckahoe plantation was] the scene of boisterous barbecues, fish fries, and fancy dress balls. The clapboard mansion was known throughout the colonies for its fine walnut paneling and fragrant boxwood gardens. Done up in velvet and gold, the colonel’s bedroom was the stuff of legend; the stables housed some of the fastest horses in the South.

— Alan Pell Crawford

During her childhood, Ann and her cousin Martha Jefferson Randolph were close friends. Her mother died in March 1789. In September 1790, her father married Gabriela, a woman about Ann's age.

By the age of sixteen, Ann had a number of suitors. She was described as "by every indication a fetching girl with a 'little upturned nose,' a gift for self-dramatization, remarkably little in the way of discretion, and oodles of sex appeal." Ann and her stepmother fought, and Ann was asked to leave the house.

== Scandal ==
When she was about nineteen years old, Ann went to live with her sister Judith and brother-in-law, Richard Randolph, at Bizarre Plantation, (Note: Bizarre is believed to be named from the French word, Bizarre, meaning valorous. In June 1796, architect Benjamin Latrobe visited the Bizarre plantation and noted in his journal the property had a "French name, but not quite applicable to Mr. Richard Randolph's house at present, for there is nothing bizarre about it that I can see.") an Antebellum tobacco plantation at what would become the corner of East Second and North Main Streets in Farmville, Virginia. Richard and his brothers Theodorick Randolph and John Randolph of Roanoke lost their father in 1775, and three years later their mother married St. George Tucker, a prominent lawyer and future law professor at the College of William and Mary as well as Virginia appellate judge. The eldest and therefore heir to most of their late father's estate had studied at Princeton as well as with noted Virginia jurist George Wythe (St. George Tucker's mentor and friend) before taking control of his late father's plantation. However, the tobacco economy was collapsing at the time.

Ann became engaged to Theodoric Randolph, against her father's wishes. However, he died in the spring of 1792. Some later claimed that Ann and Richard were too fond of one another, and in the summer of 1792, Ann began gaining noticeable weight. On October 1, 1792, Judith, Richard, and Ann traveled to the Glentivar (or Glenlyvar) estate thirty miles northeast of Farmville to visit their cousin Randolph Harrison and his wife, Mary. The following night, Ann screamed, awakening the Harrisons. A servant told Mary Harrison that Ann was sick and needed laudanum. Richard was in Ann's dark room and would not allow a candle to be brought in, but Mary Harrison was able to sit with Ann for a few minutes. Judith remained in bed in the room she was staying in. The next day, blood was found on Ann's pillowcases and the stairs; her bedding had been removed; and she remained in her room. The Randolphs left the Harrisons’ estate at the end of the week. The Harrisons were later told that the plantation's enslaved people found the corpse of a baby in a pile of old shingles.

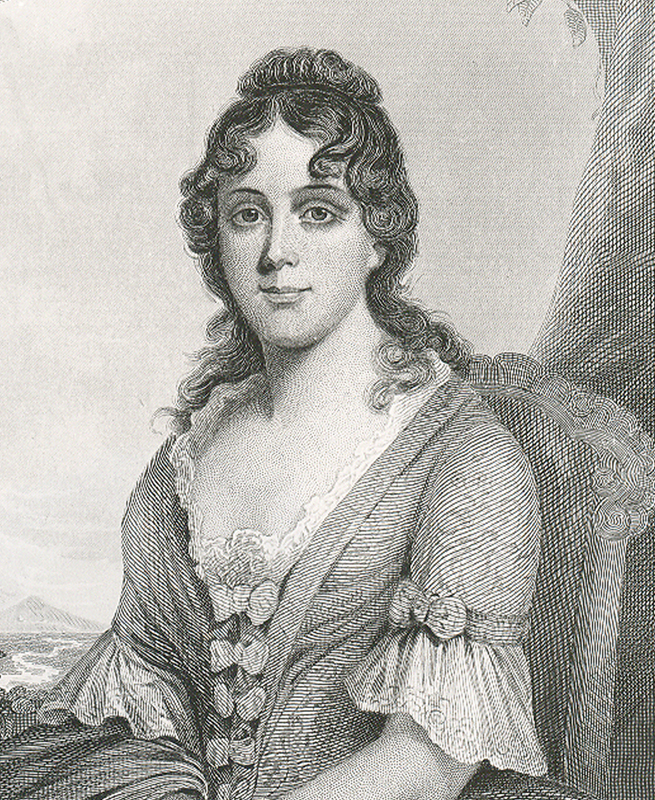
Martha Jefferson Randolph was Ann Cary Randolph's cousin, friend, and sister-in-law. She testified at the trial of Richard Randolph.

In April 1793, the local prosecutor accused Richard Randolph of murdering the baby born to Ann. Prominent lawyers John Marshall and Patrick Henry defended him at a trial before the judges of the Prince Edward County court. During the trial, Martha Jefferson Randolph stated that she had obtained gum guaicum, which she believed could be used to abort a baby, and had given it to Ann two weeks before the trip to Glentivar. Other people also testified during the trial that Ann had been pregnant.

Enslaved people were precluded from testifying by Virginia law, so no evidence could be presented about the body found in the stack of shingles. Judith Randolph either did not testify or she testified that Richard did not leave their room that night. Richard Randolph was acquitted. Despite the acquittal, one modern author noted Ann faced severe consequences: "before the year was out, the girl [Ann] had become the Jezebel of the Old Dominion and the young man who was the alleged father [Richard] had become its laughing stock. Idlers in taverns made ribald jokes at his expense."

Upon hearing of the scandal, Thomas Jefferson wrote a letter to his daughter, Martha Jefferson Randolph, saying he considered Ann "the pitiable victim" and encouraged his daughter to be a kind influence in her life. In fact, Ann had been engaged to Richard Randolph's brother, Theodoric, who had died eight months before the stillbirth. Jefferson stated that he only found one person guilty.

For her [Ann] it is the moment of trying the affection of her friends, when their commiseration and comfort become balm to her wounds. I hope you will deal them out to her in full measure, regardless of what the trifling or malignant may think or say. Never throw off the best affections of nature in the moment when they become most precious to their object; nor fear to extend your hand to save another, lest you should sink yourself. You are on firm ground: your kindnesses will help her and count in your own favor also.

— Thomas Jefferson in a letter to Martha Jefferson Randolph, dated April 28, 1793.

Martha responded that the "vile seducer" had both destroyed Ann's reputation and corrupted her mind, and she was concerned that some people may be swayed from what a "person of sense" would deduce about the scandal.

Richard Randolph died mysteriously in 1796, leaving behind a will which scandalized many because it manumitted his slaves, a direction Judith Randolph fought for years to implement; afterwards, Ann continued to live at the Bizarre plantation. (Note: The Bizarre plantation house burned down in 1813 and Judith moved into a small house in Farmdale. Judith had two sons with Richard: one who died before the age of 20 and another who was born deaf.) Richard's brother, the childless and unmarried John Randolph of Roanoke, thought that Ann had poisoned Richard, and came into power the guardian for Richard and Judith's underage sons. In 1805, John asked Ann to leave the Bizarre Plantation. She spent the first couple of nights in the abandoned Tuckahoe mansion before living with various friends. She then lived at Monticello with her brother, Thomas Mann Randolph Jr., who had since married their cousin, Martha Jefferson Randolph. She also lived in Richmond, Rhode Island, and Connecticut. Ann had very limited means, at times receiving small sums of money from her brothers, and she may have taught school in Rhode Island.

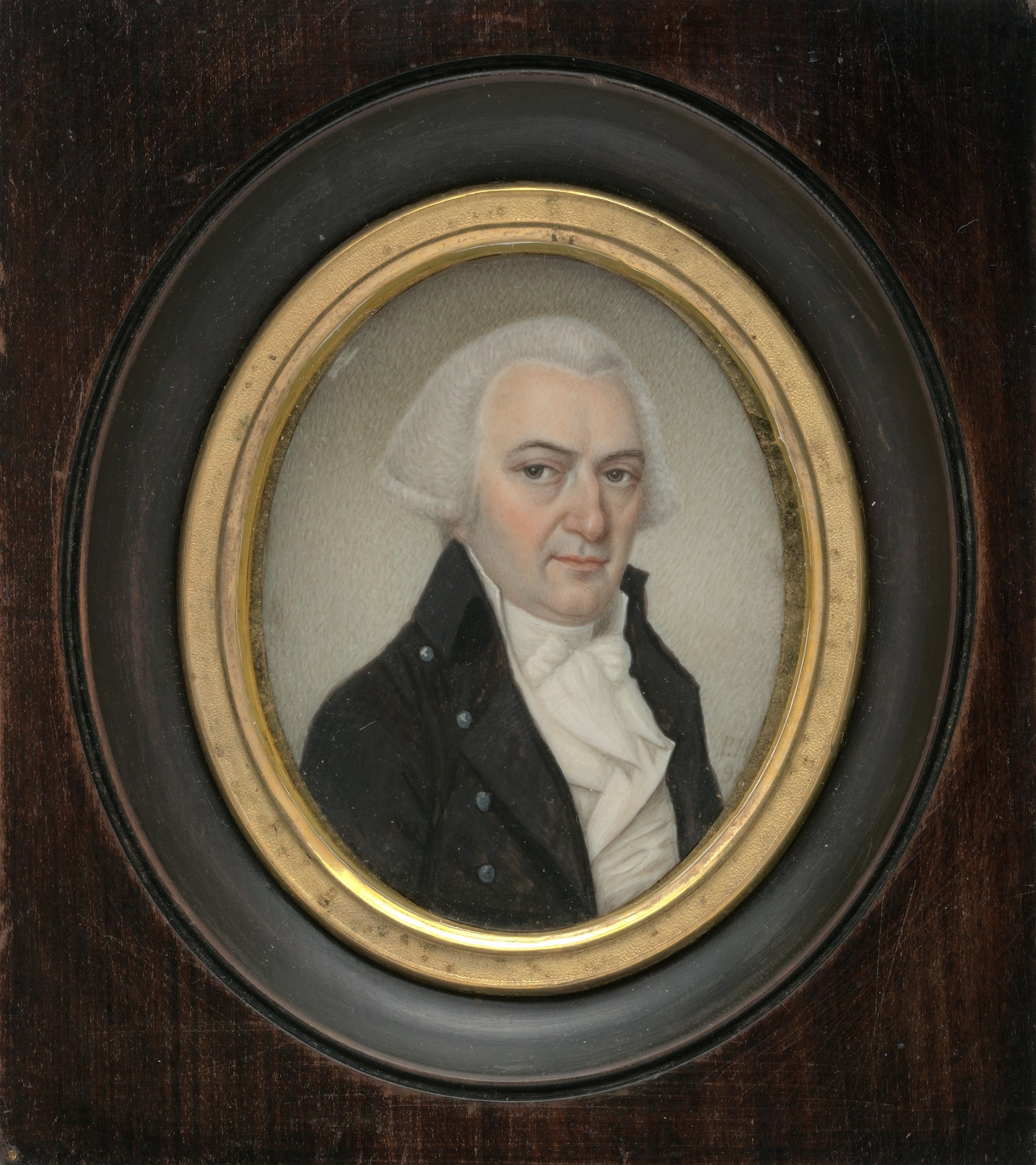
Gouverneur Morris, 1798

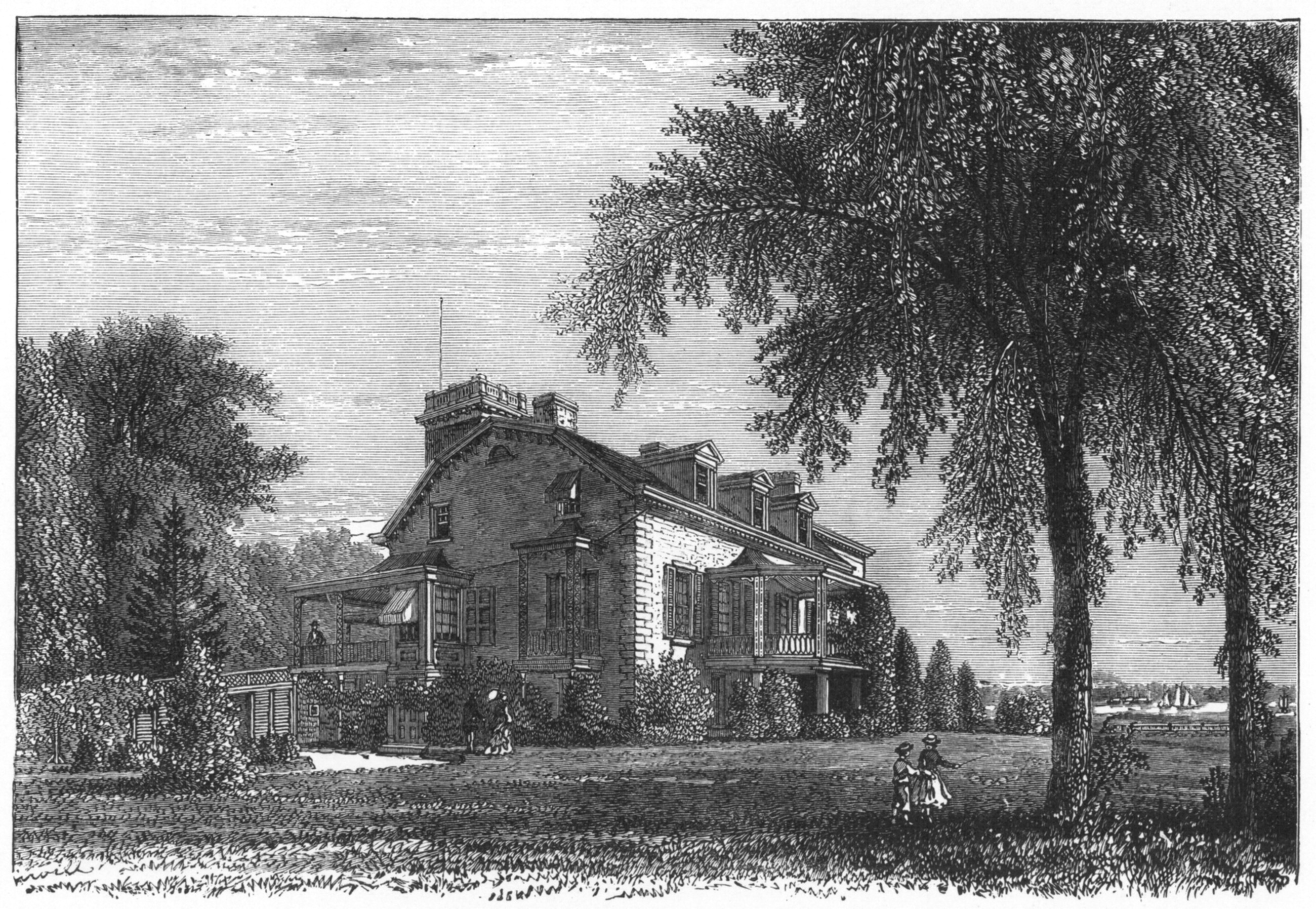
Morrisania mansion

== Marriage and later life ==
Ann was living in a boarding house in New York in October 1808 when she received a visit from Gouverneur Morris, whom she met when he visited Tuckahoe Plantation around 1788. Morris was a senator for New York, a delegate to both the Continental Congress and the Constitutional Convention, and an U.S. ambassador to France under President Washington. In April 1809, she accepted a position as his housekeeper and went to work and live in New York at his residence, Morrisania. As a surprise to Morrisania guests, they were married on Christmas Day in 1809, with Ann's plain, worn housekeeping dress serving as her wedding gown. Kirschke states, "Her wedding dress was a statement that they both very much enjoyed, Nancy [Ann] because it showed her gratitude for his past kindness and Morris likely because of the element of surprise for the guests."

Ann's marriage to a prestigious figure allowed her to regain social prominence. From June to September in 1810, the newlywed couple traveled to inspect the land for the Erie Canal. In December 1811, they were guests at the White House, where they met with President James Madison and First Lady Dolley Madison and socialized with political and diplomatic figures. In 1815, Ann recommended Samuel Larned as consul at Gibraltar in a letter to President Madison. Larned went on to have a 23-year career in diplomatic service.

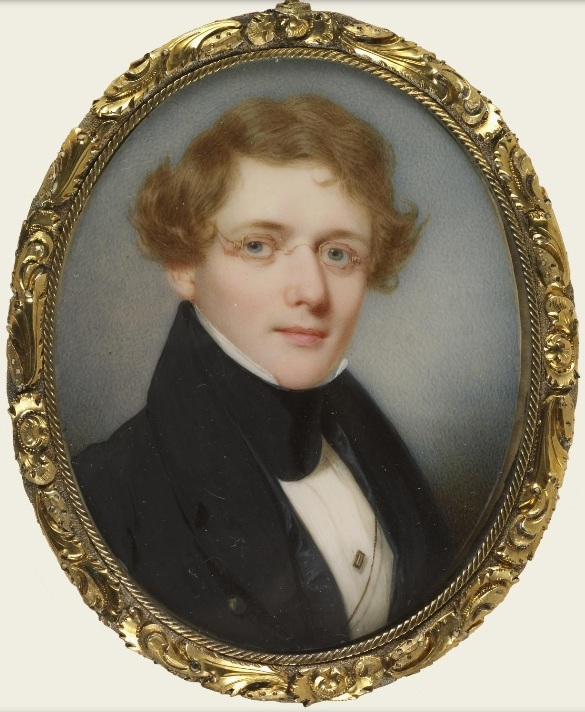
Gouverneur Morris Jr., 1840

The couple had one child, Gouverneur Morris Jr., in 1813. In October 1813, Gouverneur was away from his wife and baby and wrote a poem for her in a letter. After he returned home, the couple spent only one other night apart. (Note: Gouverneur Mooris's poem to Ann during an absence from her and their infant son: Kiss for me, my love, our charming boy I long to taste again the joy Of pressing to his father’s breast The son and mother. Be they blest With all which bounteous Heaven can grant And if among us one must want Of bliss, be mine the scanty lot. Your happiness, may no dark spot Of gloomy woe or piercing pain Or melancholy ever stain…) Ann had the poem published posthumously in the alumni magazine The Columbian.

Ann maintained relationships with family members and friends in Virginia, (Note: She had contact with the Randolphs (Thomas and Martha) at Monticello and Gouverneur and Ann had planned a visit to Monticello according to a letter from Thomas Jefferson dated October 20, 1816 (Gouverneur died November 6, 1816).) which included her sister Judith and Judith's sons. Tudor Randolph, the youngest son, attended Harvard University in 1814 and became seriously ill with tuberculosis. Ann took him in at the Morrisania and cared for him for three months. Judith and John Randolph of Roanoke visited Morrisania during Tudor's convalescence. In the hope that a change in climate would help him improve his health, Tudor traveled to England, but he died there in August 1815. Judith died in 1816.

On his way home to Virginia from his visit to Morrisania, John Randolph wrote a "vitriolic" letter to Ann, who then wrote a long response to twenty of John's political opponents. Throughout the years, John Randolph attempted to keep the Bizarre Plantation scandal alive, and Ann heard unflattering rumors about herself throughout New York. The animus toward her extended to relatives of Gouverneur Morris, who were no longer heirs to Morris's estate because of his marriage to Ann and the birth of their son.

Gouverneur Morris died on November 6, 1816, at Morrisania. Ann and her son continued to live at Morrisania until she died in 1837. Ann considered her son her "richest treasure" and focused much of her attention on ensuring that he received a good education. Her son became a railroad executive and was one of the founders of the Republican Party. He married his cousin, Martha "Patsey" Jefferson Cary, the daughter of Ann's younger sister Virginia Randolph Cary.

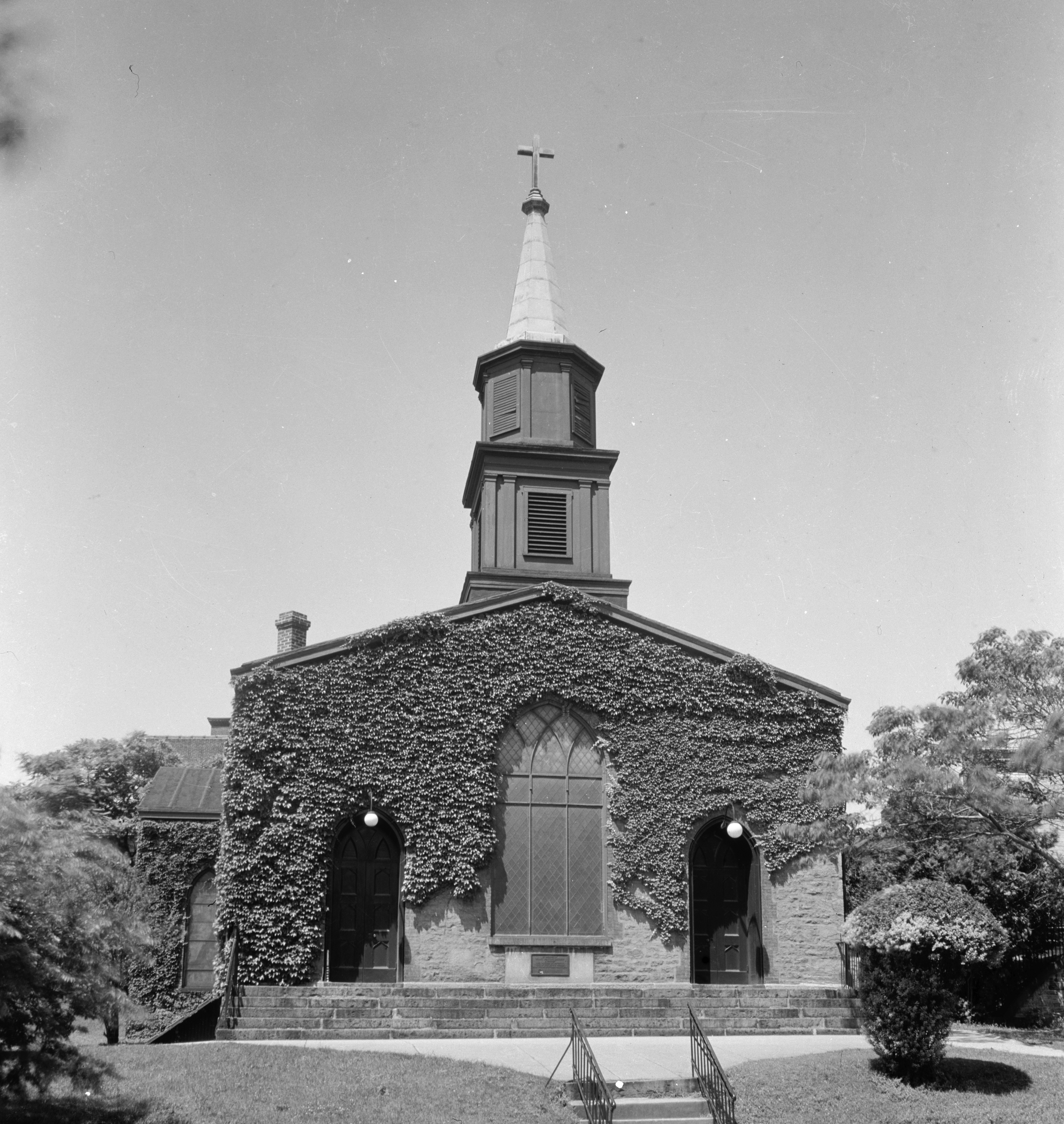
St. Ann's Episcopal Church, 1934

Ann fought rumors from her in-laws that her son was not a son of Gouverneur Morris. She used the press, friends' advice, and attorneys to address claims against her and her husband's character. Her efforts, and those of her husband's before he died, did much to restore her reputation. She also managed her husband's estate, which was diminished due to mismanagement by one of his nephews, so that her son would inherit an "unencumbered estate".

Ann died in 1837. In her memory, her son built the St. Ann's Episcopal Church along the Harlem River on the grounds of Morrisania.

Gouverneur Morris born Feb. 9, 1813; died Aug. 20, 1888. Founder of this Parish, to which he gave church and lands for the glory of God and in memory of his mother.

— Inscription on a plaque to the right of the chancel at St Ann's Episcopal Church.

Ann and Gouverneur Morris are buried in a family crypt at St. Ann's.
