= Virginia Randolph Cary =

American writer

- Born: Virginia Randolph; January 30, 1786; Tuckahoe Plantation
- Died: May 2, 1852 (aged 66); Alexandria, Virginia
- Spouse: Wilson Jefferson Cary
- Parent(s): Thomas Mann Randolph Sr. Ann Cary Randolph
- Relatives: Mary Randolph (sister); Thomas Mann Randolph Jr. (brother); Martha Jefferson Randolph (sister-in-law, cousin); Judith Randolph (sister); Ann Cary Randolph Morris (sister)

Virginia Randolph Cary (January 30, 1786 – May 2, 1852) was an American writer. She was the author of Letters on Female Character, Addressed to a Young Lady, on the Death of Her Mother (1828), an influential advice book.

== Early life and family ==
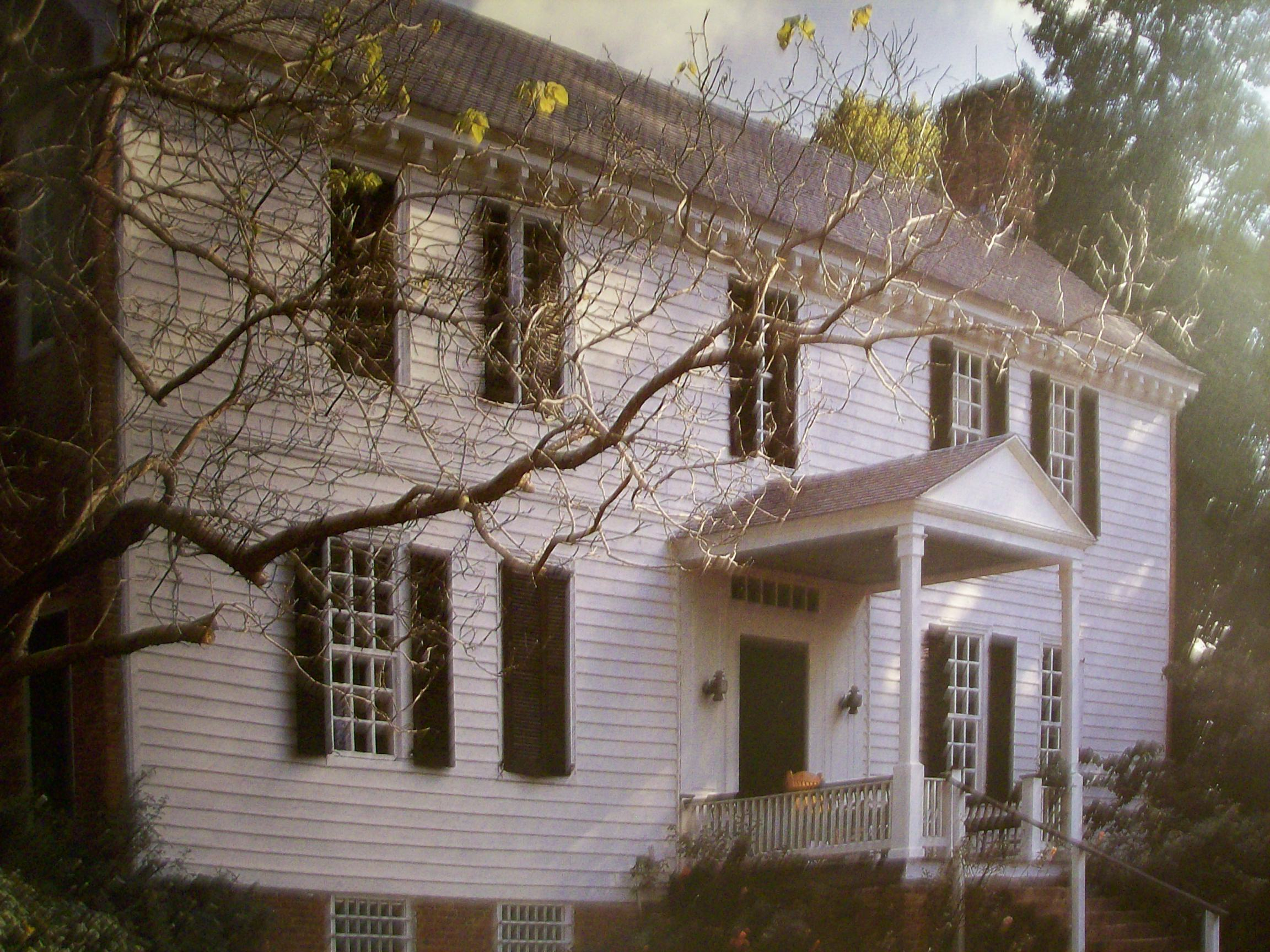
Tuckahoe plantation, the home of her parents, Thomas Mann Randolph Sr. and Ann Cary Randolph

Coat of Arms of William Randolph

Virginia Randolph Cary was born on January 30, 1786, most likely in Goochland County, Virginia, at Tuckahoe, the plantation owned by her parents. Her twelve sisters and brothers included Mary Randolph (1762–1828), author of the influential cookbook The Virginia House-Wife (1824), and Thomas Mann Randolph, Jr. (1768–1828), who served in the United States House of Representatives from 1803 to 1807 and as Governor of Virginia from 1819 to 1822.

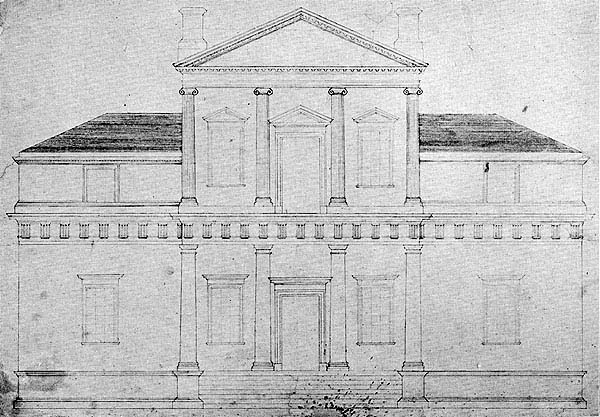
Monticello elevation drawing, 1771. Monticello was Thomas Jefferson's residence. Construction of the dome was (which gives Monticello its current profile), was being built into the 19th century.

After her mother died in 1789, the three-year-old Cary lived at Monticello in Albemarle County, Virginia with her brother and sister-in-law, Thomas Mann Randolph Jr. and Martha Jefferson (1772–1836), the daughter of Thomas Jefferson. Her sister Judith married William Randolph's great-grandson, Richard Randolph of Bizarre. His paternal ancestors included Pocahontas, the youngest daughter of Chief Powhatan and her English-born husband John Rolfe. Her older sister, Ann Cary "Nancy" Randolph, was the wife of Gouverneur Morris and mother of Gouverneur Morris Jr. Ann figured in a scandal involving her brother-in-law and distant cousin, Richard Randolph of Bizarre, in which he was responsible for "feloniously murdering a child said to be borne of Nancy [Ann] Randolph."

== Works ==
After the death of her husband in 1823, as a widow, she published four major works:

- Letters on Female Character, Addressed to a Young Lady, on the Death of Her Mother. Richmond, Va: Ariel Works. 1828. "Virginia Randolph Cary." (an advice book)
- Mutius: An Historical Sketch of the Fourth Century, American Sunday-School Union, (1828)
- Cary, Virginia (1829). Christian Parent's Assistant, or Tales, for the Moral and Religious Instruction of Youth. Richmond, Va: Ariel Works. "Virginia Cary."
- Ruth Churchill; or, The True Protestant: A Tale for the Times (1851), C. Shepard & Co., a novel

== Personal life ==
On August 28, 1805 she married her cousin Wilson Jefferson Cary (1783-1823), of Fluvanna County, Virginia. They had six children:

- Col. Wilson Miles Cary (1806–1877), who married Jane Margaret Carr (1809–1903)
- Archibald Cary (1815-1854), who married Monimia Fairfax (1820–1875), the daughter of Thomas Fairfax, 9th Lord Fairfax of Cameron (1762–1846).
- Jane Blair Cary
- Elizabeth Randolph Cary
- Mary Randolph Cary (1811–1887), who married Orlando Fairfax, son of Thomas Fairfax, 9th Lord Fairfax of Cameron
- Martha Jefferson Cary (1820-1873), who married Gouverneur Morris Jr. (1813–1888)

Cary died in Alexandria, Virginia, and is buried in Saint Paul's Episcopal Church Cemetery.

=== Descendants ===
Her granddaughter was the writer Constance Cary (1843–1920), who was one of three women to sew the first examples of the Confederate Battle Flag. She was married to Burton Harrison (1838–1904). Another granddaughter was Hetty Cary (1836–1892), who married John Pegram (1832–1865) and later Henry Newell Martin (1848–1896).

== See also ==
- Randolph family of Virginia

== Sources ==
- Cynthia A. Kierner, "'The dark and dense cloud perpetually lowering over us': Gender and the Decline of the Gentry in Postrevolutionary Virginia," Journal of the Early Republic 20 (2000): 185–217.
- Patrick H. Breen, ed., "The Female Antislavery Petition Campaign of 1831–32," Virginia Magazine of History and Biography 110 (2002): 377–398.
