= St. Ann's Episcopal Church (Bronx) =

Episcopal church in the Bronx, New York

St. Ann's Church
- St. Ann's Church of Morrisania
- St. Ann's Episcopal Church of Morrisania
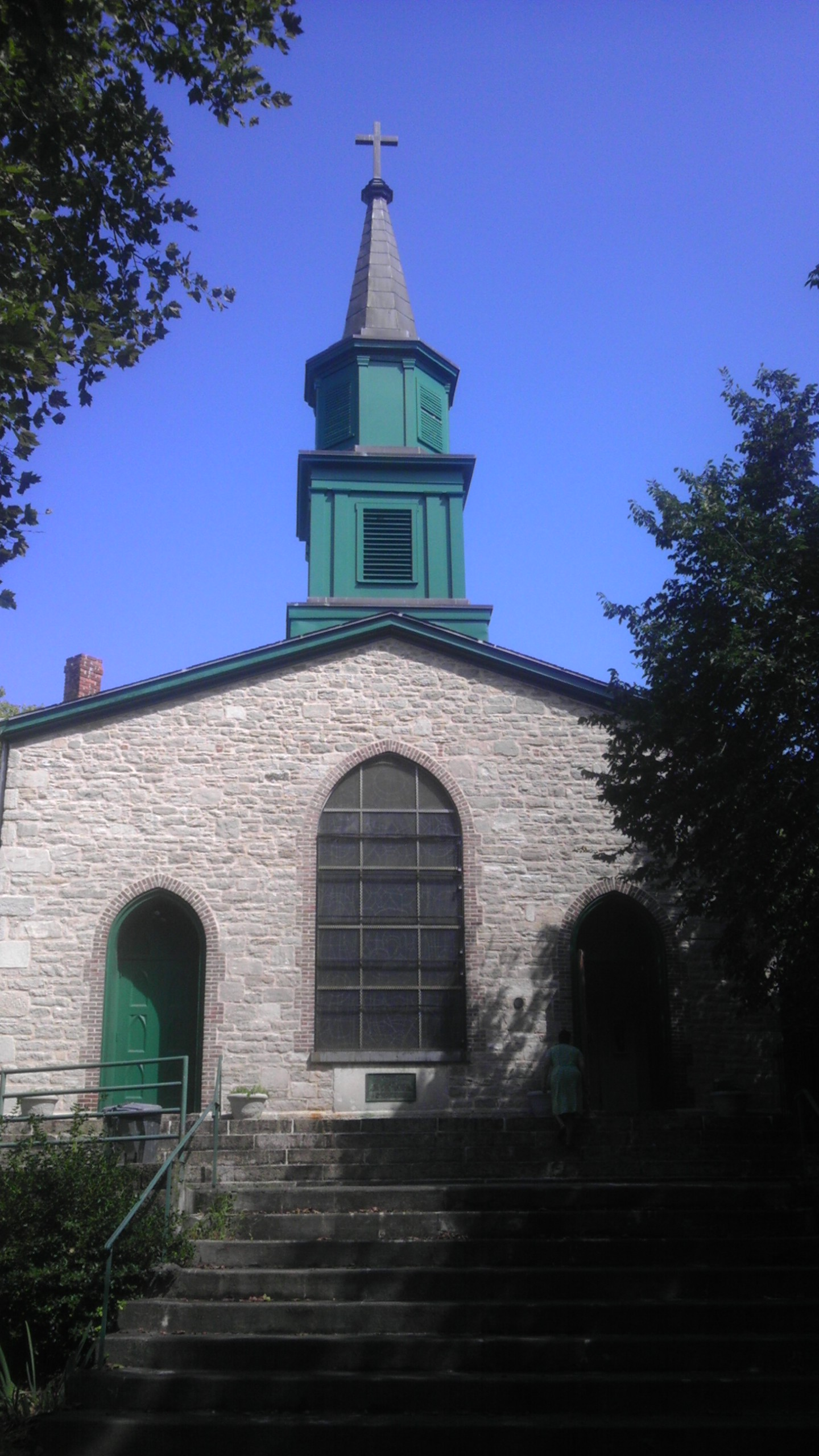
- In 2012

- Location of St. Ann's Church in New York City
- 40°48′30″N 73°55′3″W
- Location: 295 St. Ann’s Avenue, Bronx, New York
- Country: United States
- Language: American English
- Denomination: Episcopal
- Website: stannssouthbronx.org

History
- Former name: Morrisania Memorial
- Status: Parish church
- Founded: 1841; 185 years ago
- Founder: Gouverneur Morris Jr.
- Dedication: Saint Ann

Architecture
- Architectural type: Greek Revival, Gothic Revival
- Years built: 1840; 186 years ago

Administration
- Diocese: Episcopal Diocese of New York

Clergy
- Rector: Martha Overall
- Pastor: Martha Overall
- St. Ann's Church Complex
- U.S. National Register of Historic Places
- New York City Landmark
- Area: 2 acres (0.81 ha)
- Built: 1840
- NRHP reference No.: 80002589

Significant dates
- Added to NRHP: April 16, 1980
- Designated NYCL: June 9, 1967

St. Ann's Church, also known as St. Ann's Church of Morrisania, is a historic Episcopal church in the Mott Haven neighborhood of the South Bronx in New York City.

== History ==
Gouverneur Morris Jr. (1813-1888) had St. Ann's Church built in memory of his mother, Ann Cary Randolph Morris, who died in 1837.

Gouverneur Morris born Feb. 9, 1813; died Aug. 20, 1888. Founder of this Parish, to which he gave church and lands for the glory of God and in memory of his mother.

— Inscription on a plaque to the right of the chancel.

It was built in 1840 and donated by him as a family monument, the Morrisania Memorial. It is a fieldstone building in the Gothic Revival style with a vernacular Greek Revival style tower. The complex includes the stone parish house added in 1916, late-19th century Sunday School and gymnasium building, and a graveyard that includes the Morris family crypt. Among those whose remains are in the graveyard or crypt are Gouverneur Morris, the "Penman of the Constitution" (1752–1816), Ann Cary Randolph Morris (1774-1837), Lewis Morris (1671–1746), and Lewis Morris (1726–1798). Gouverneur Morris is a signatory to the Constitution, which he helped draft. His half-brother, Lewis Morris, is a signatory to the Declaration of Independence.

The complex was listed on the National Register of Historic Places in 1980. It was designated a New York City landmark in 1967.

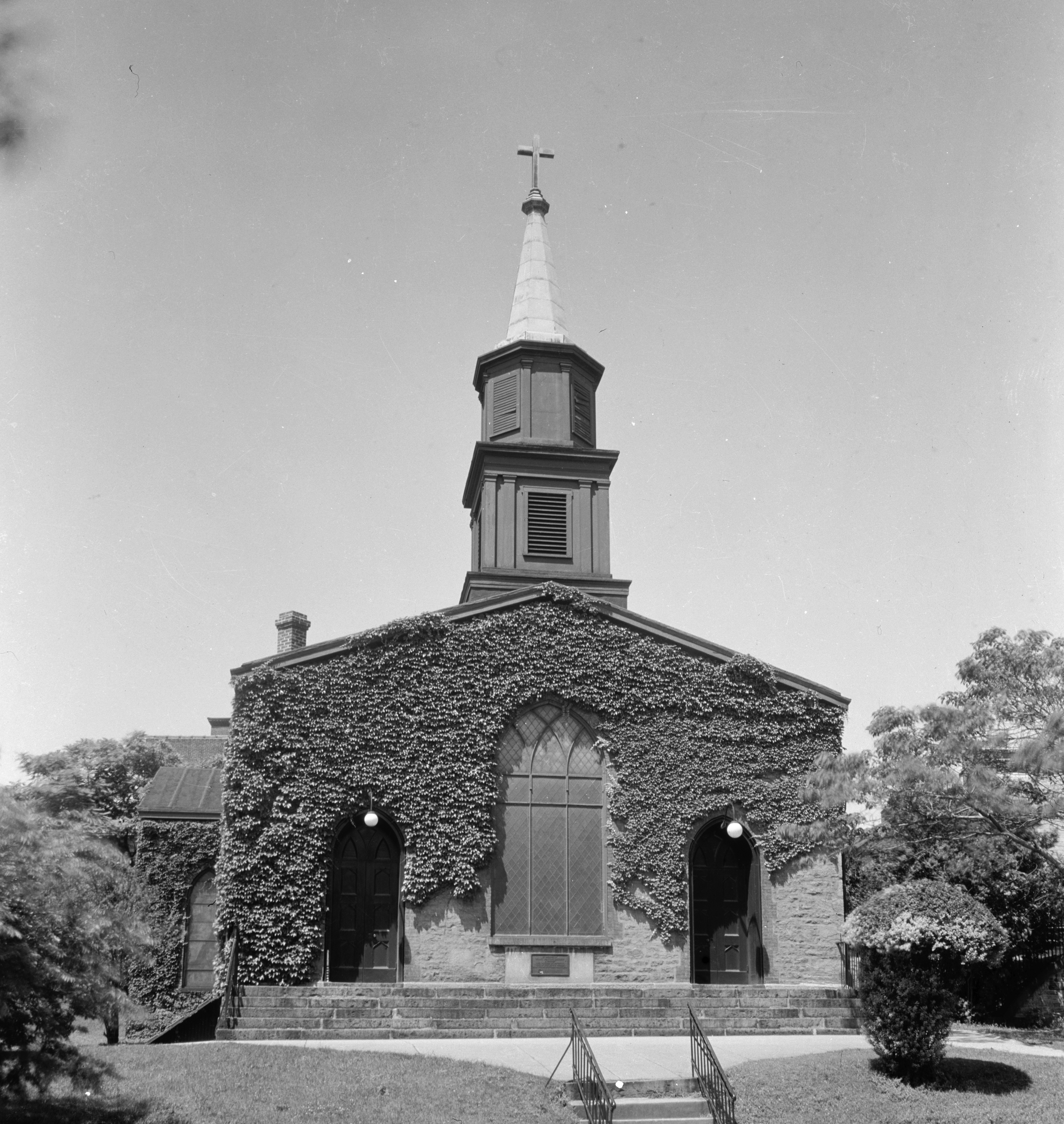

== See also ==
- List of New York City Designated Landmarks in The Bronx
- National Register of Historic Places in Bronx County, New York
