= SS Gouverneur Morris =

World War II Liberty ship of the United States

History

United States
- Name: Gouverneur Morris
- Namesake: Gouverneur Morris
- Builder: Oregon Shipbuilding Company, Portland, Oregon
- Laid down: 29 March 1943
- Launched: 18 April 1943
- Fate: Transferred to Russia, 1943

Soviet Union
- Name: Leningrad
- Acquired: 1943
- Renamed: Ivan Kulibin
- Fate: Scrapped, 1974

General characteristics
- Type: Liberty ship
- Tonnage: 7,000 long tons deadweight (DWT)
- Length: 441 ft 6 in (134.57 m)
- Beam: 56 ft 10.75 in (17.3419 m)
- Draft: 27 ft 9.25 in (8.4646 m)
- Propulsion: 2 × oil-fired boilers; Triple expansion steam engine, 2,500 hp (1,864 kW); single screw
- Speed: 11.5 knots (21.3 km/h; 13.2 mph)
- Capacity: 9,140 tons cargo
- Complement: 41
- Armament: 1 × 4 in (100 mm) deck gun; Variety of anti-aircraft guns

SS Gouverneur Morris (Hull Number 1627) was a Liberty ship built in the United States during World War II. She was named after Gouverneur Morris, a Founding Father who wrote large sections of the United States Constitution, including its Preamble.

The ship was laid down on 29 March 1943, then launched on 18 April 1943. She was given to the Soviet Union in 1943, where she was renamed the Leningrad. Later in her life, she was given the name Ivan Kulibin after an 18th-century Russian mechanic and inventor before the ship was scrapped in 1974.
