= John Woodson (burgess) =

Virginia politician and landowner

Member of the Virginia House of Delegates for Goochland County, Virginia
- In office May 7, 1781 – April 1782 Serving with Stephen Sampson
- Preceded by: Thomas Mann Randolph Sr.
- Succeeded by: John Payne
- In office October 7, 1776 – May 3, 1778 Serving with Tarlton Fleming, Thomas Underwood
- Preceded by: position created
- Succeeded by: John Payne

Member of the Virginia House of Burgesses for Goochland County, Virginia
- In office 1768–1775 Serving with John Payne, Josias Payne, Thomas Mann Randolph Sr.
- Preceded by: John Bolling
- Succeeded by: position eliminated

Personal details
- Born: 1703 Goochland County, Virginia
- Died: 1789 (aged 85–86) Goochland County, Virginia
- Spouse: Dorothea Randolph
- Children: 9 daughters, 3 sons
- Occupation: planter, politician

Military service
- Branch/service: Virginia Militia
- Rank: colonel

John Woodson (circa 1730 – 1789), was a Virginia planter and politician who served several terms in the House of Burgesses, all five Virginia Revolutionary Conventions and three in the Virginia House of Delegates, all representing Goochland County, Virginia. The first of the Woodson family to win election to the Virginia General Assembly, four distant relations of the same name would also serve in the Virginia House of Delegates representing other counties.

== Early life ==
A member of the third generation to succeed British ship's surgeon Dr. John Woodson (who arrived in the Virginia colony in 1619 and survived the Massacre of 1622 but not that of 1644), he was born to the former Mary Royall and her planter husband Josiah Woodson. His grandfather (also) John Woodson (d. 1715) had been a surveyor in the area for William Byrd II, from whom he also bought Sabot Island in the James River. Byrd later noted that Woodson gave "large measure" on lands he patented for his family, for although he described about 2700 acres on both sides of the river near Genito Creek, when his son (also John, this man's uncle) re-surveyed the property (as required for a transfer after death), the actual acreage was 4,934 acres. Grandfather Woodson also built a water-powered mill on the part of his land which later became Ben Dover. He began the family's rise into gentility (and eventually the First Families of Virginia after this man) by becoming one of Goochland County's first justices of the peace, and later a sheriff as would his son in 1732 (a coveted position of the day whose responsibility included tax collection, for which he could retain 10% for his own account). His son (this man's uncle) Major John Woodson is believed to have lived near the mansion known as Eastwood built by Randolph Harrison Sr. circa 1819. Another uncle, Robert Woodson, sold 1300 acres to Thomas Randolph of Tuckahoe in 1728 and sold Sabot Island to the same man the next year, although upon Randolph's death they would pass to Joseph Watkins of Genito, a Quaker surveyor and speculator who acquired lands as far west as Ohio. Meanwhile, this man's father built his home on a 1500 acre tract where "Boscobel" now stands along River Road, and this man would inherit it, but it left the Woodson family when this man's son (also Josiah Woodson) moved to Kentucky in 1814, and would be acquired by wealthy investor Richard Sampson between 1844 and 1847.

== Career ==
As discussed above, Woodson operated a plantation near Dover in Goochland County using enslaved labor, which he inherited from his father. Referred to as Col. John Woodson in the 1787 Virginia tax roll, he owned 13 adult slaves and 11 slaves younger than 16 years old, as well as 22 horses and 47 cattle, whereas his relative John Woodson of Cartersville across the river enslaved six adults and one child, and also owned four horses and 21 cattle but was not titheable.

This John Woodson began his public career in 1756, when he became a vestryman of the local St. James Northam parish, and served for decades. Goochland County voters first elected Woodson as one of their delegates to the House of Burgesses (a part-time position) in 1768, when he succeeded John Bolling, who accepted the position of sheriff (and so could not serve in the legislature). They re-elected Woodson until Governor Dunmore prorogued (suspended) the legislature in 1775, so he served alongside John Payne, Josias Payne (each for one session) then Thomas Mann Randolph Sr.. Goochland voters then elected him and Randolph to each of the five Virginia Revolutionary Conventions. Woodson and Thomas Underwood became Goochland County's first two representatives in the Virginia House of Delegates in 1776 and were re-elected once, but John Payne replaced Woodson in 1778 when Woodson chose instead to be the local sheriff. Woodson served one more term in the House of Delegates in 1781, when Thomas Underwood chose to become the sheriff and was briefly replaced by Thomas Mann Randolph Sr.

During the American Revolutionary War, Woodson held the rank of colonel in the Goochland militia. One online source claims he served as the elected sheriff of Goochland County from 1778 until 1789. He also served on a court in Goochland County in September 1782 to determine losses by inhabitants due to General Cornwallis' raids.

== Personal life ==
On October 25, 1751, Woodson married Dorothea Randolph, one of the daughters of merchant, planter and burgess Isham Randolph of Dungeness. They had a dozen children, including sons Josiah Woodson, Isham Woodson and John Steven Woodson, as well as daughters Jane, Elizabeth, Susanna, Martha, Judith, Sarah, Mary, Lucy and Anne.

== Death and legacy ==
Woodson died at his Goochland home in December 1789, and was buried there. However, the area was developed and the precise gravesite is now unknown. The published index of Goochland probate records includes entries relating to men named "John Woodson" in 1734, 1754, 1790 and 1823.
