= Presquile Plantation =

Coordinates: 37.350°N 77.270°W

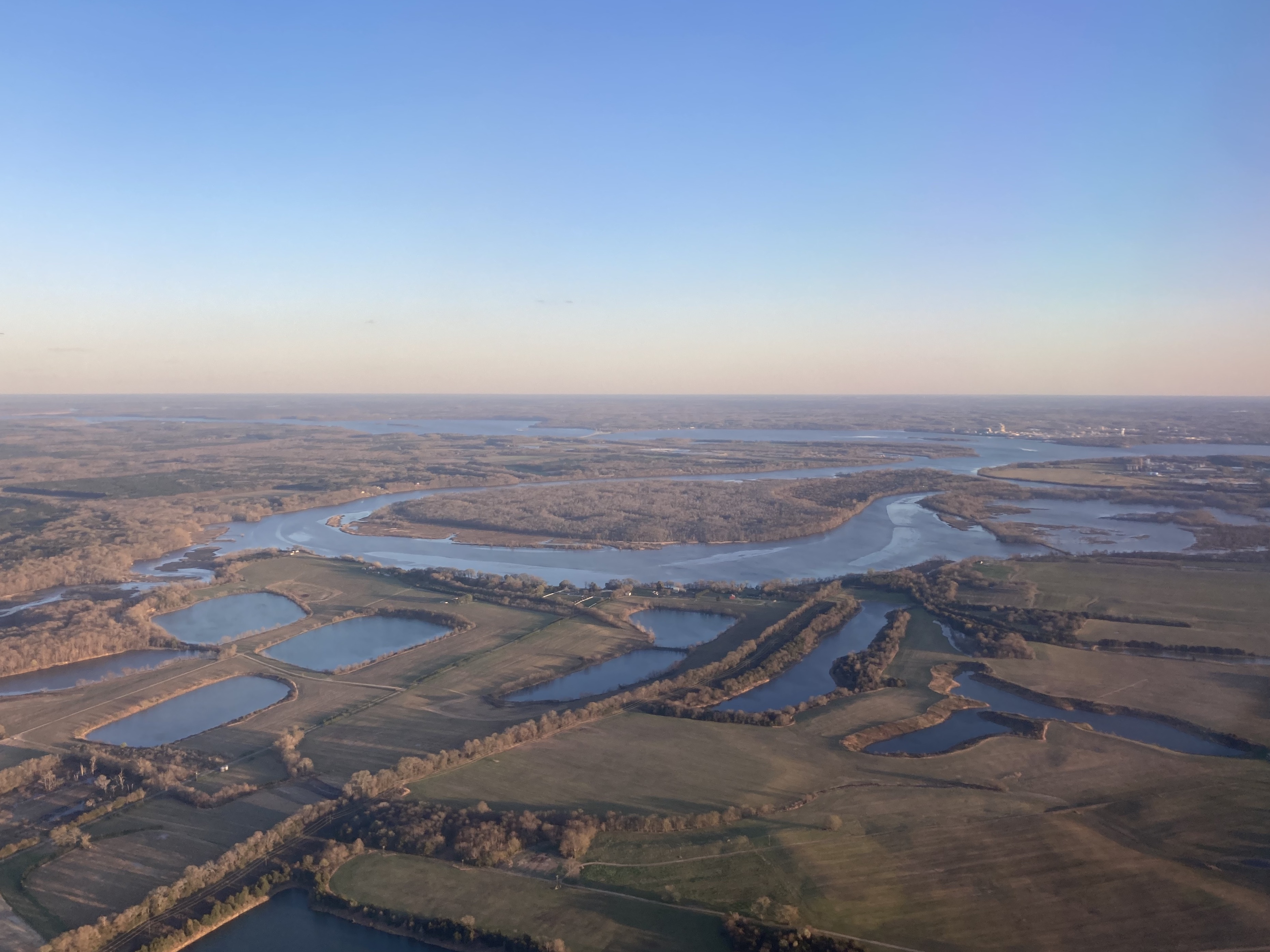
Presquile Island

Presquile Plantation was a plantation located in southeastern Chesterfield County, Virginia built in the mid 18th century probably by Richard Randolph II of Curles, a grandson of William Randolph the Immigrant. The site of the plantation was just south of Turkey Island, one of William Randolph's earliest land holdings. Richard Randolph most likely built the house at Presquile for his son David Meade Randolph, the husband of the esteemed Mary Randolph. Unfortunately, the couple did not live at Presquile for long, as the land surrounding it was extremely swampy and did not promote good health. In 1798 they moved to Richmond and lived in a grand mansion called Moldavia (named for the couple: Mary "Molly" and David) that stood at the corner of 5th and Main Streets.

The next owner of Presquile was Abner Osborne of Nottoway County, who bought the property for £5,000 in 1801. It went through the 19th century and the first half of the 20th as a working farm. During the early 1900s, the 2000 foot neck that connected Presquile Island with mainland Chesterfield County was cut through to make a straighter shipping channel to Richmond. This was part of a project that also created the further upstream Jones Neck and Hatcher Island cutoffs and was preceded by the digging of the Dutch Gap Canal during the Civil War. In 1952, Presquile's owner, Adolph Dill Williams II, a Richmond tobacco magnate and philanthropist, died and willed Presquile Island to the Virginia Commission of Game and Inland Fisheries to be used as a wildlife preserve. The following year the land was passed to the US Department of the Interior and is today managed by the National Park Service as the Presquile National Wildlife Refuge. The house at Presquile was originally used by the park staff until a new dwelling nearby was built. In 1964, a historical consultant for the park service stated that he believed that the house had been built after the Civil War (when in reality it was 100 years older) and thus the 200 year old house was demolished.

The mainland portion of the Presquile property was sold for industrial development by Adolph Dill William's heirs and became the site of plants operated by Phillip Morris and ICI.
