= Gum guaicum =

Names
- Other names Guaiac resin; Gum guaiac

Identifiers
CAS Number	9000-29-7
ECHA InfoCard	100.029.566
EC Number	232-535-2
E number	E314 (antioxidants, ...)
UNII	570858Q4NE

Properties
Melting point	85–90 °C (185–194 °F; 358–363 K)
- Except where otherwise noted, data are given for materials in their standard state (at 25 °C [77 °F], 100 kPa). Infobox references

Gum guaicum, or guaiac resin, is a substance produced from the tree species Guaiacum officinale. It is registered as food additive: as a preservative under the E number E241, and as an antioxidant under E314.

Guaiac resin is also used medically for the stool guaiac test.

Chemically, it is mixture of approximately 70% alpha- and beta-guaiaconic acids, 10% guaiaretic acid, 15% guaiac beta-resin, and small quantities of other chemical compounds such as guaiac yellow and vanillin.
