= Abraham Salle =

French Huguenot

Abraham Salle (Note: The surname is also spelled Sailly, Saillee, or Sallee.) (1670–ca. 1719) was a French Huguenot who emigrated to Colonial Virginia. He was the progenitor of the Salle family in the United States. He was a successful merchant and served in the militia and was a justice of Henrico County, Virginia.

== Early life ==
Salle was born in 1670 in Saint-Martin-de-Ré, Aunis, France. His parents, Marie and Jean Salle, were from Picardy, France. Salle was raised in the religion of John Calvin's Reformed Church.

== Emigration to Virginia ==
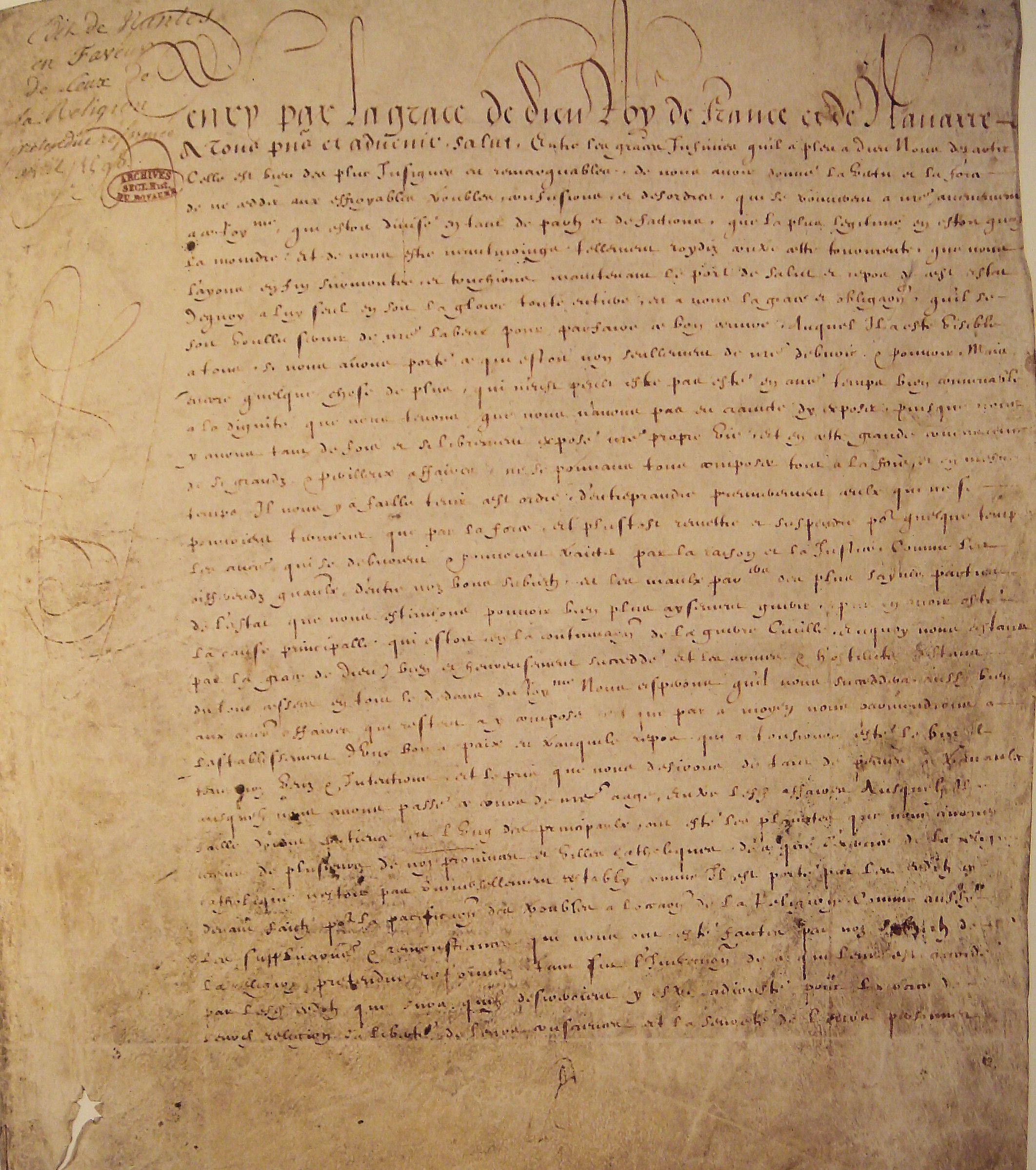
The Edict of Nantes

In 1685, Louis XIV revoked the Edict of Nantes, making it illegal for French citizens to practice the Protestant faith. Huguenots were persecuted and as a result there was a "mass exodus" from France to England, the Netherlands, Africa, Germany, and Colonial America. Some Huguenots immigrated to the colony of Virginia where they were assured political freedom by the governor.

== Manakintown ==
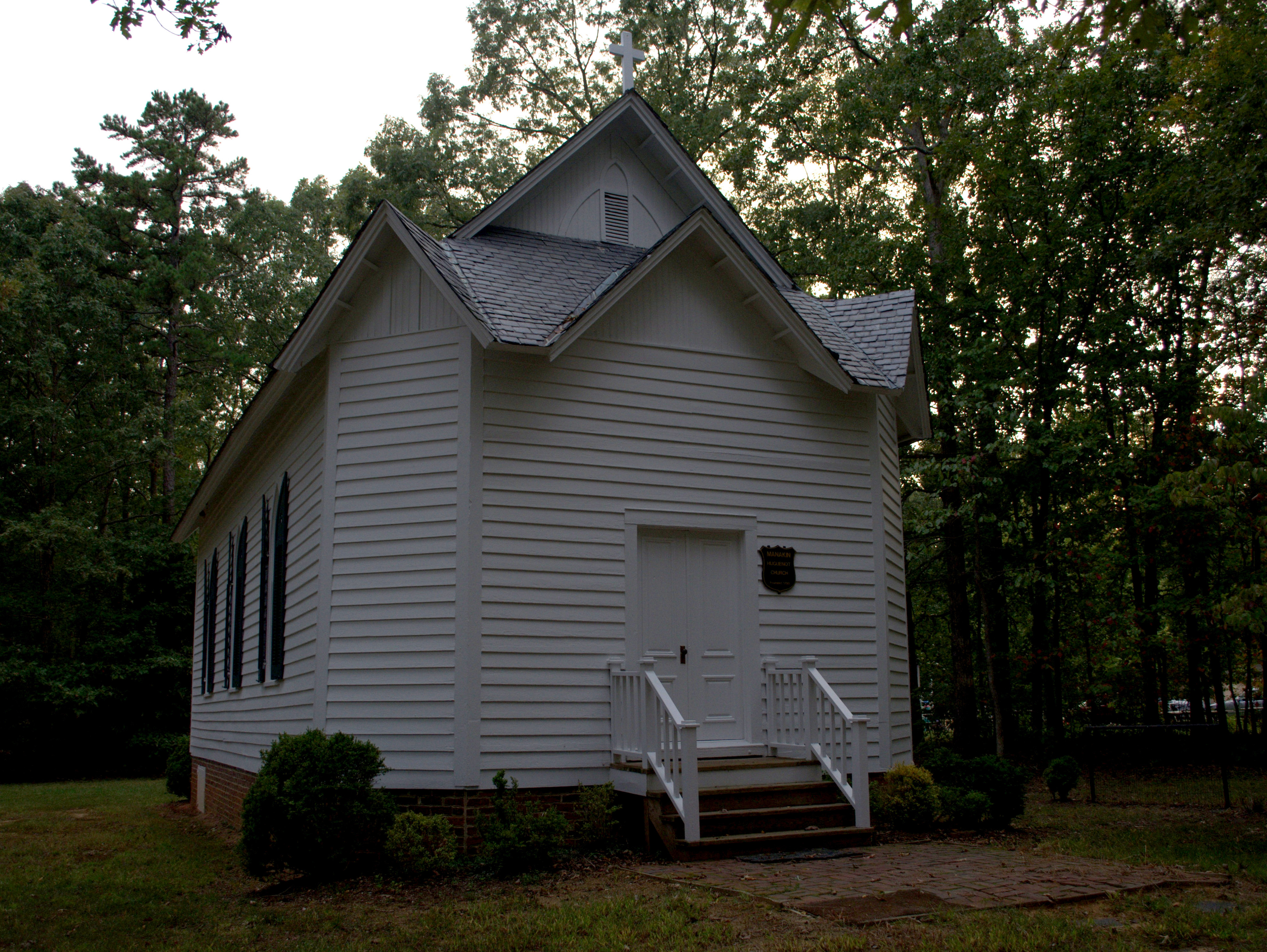
Manakin Huguenot Church Built in 1700 by French Huguenots, Protestant refugees. Burned down in the Revolutionary War, it was later rebuilt with parts of the original building. It is in what is called the Carpenter Gothic style.

Abraham Salle was first in New York in 1700, when he petitioned for privileges of citizenship of the governor and council. He moved to Manakintown in what was then Henrico County, Virginia, where Huguenots settled, many of them sailing on four ships to Virginia in 1700. Manakintown was established at the site of an old Monacan village west of Richmond, Virginia. Monacans lived in the area until about 1722. William Byrd II of Tuckahoe issued land patents totally 10,000 acres for Manakintown in 1711 and 1757. A church was established in the center of town. The emigrants were noblemen, professional people, artisans, and craftsmen. The artisans brought weaving, lace-making, and silk-work to the colony. Because they were not farmers, the initial year was difficult. They soon learned how to clear and farm the land.

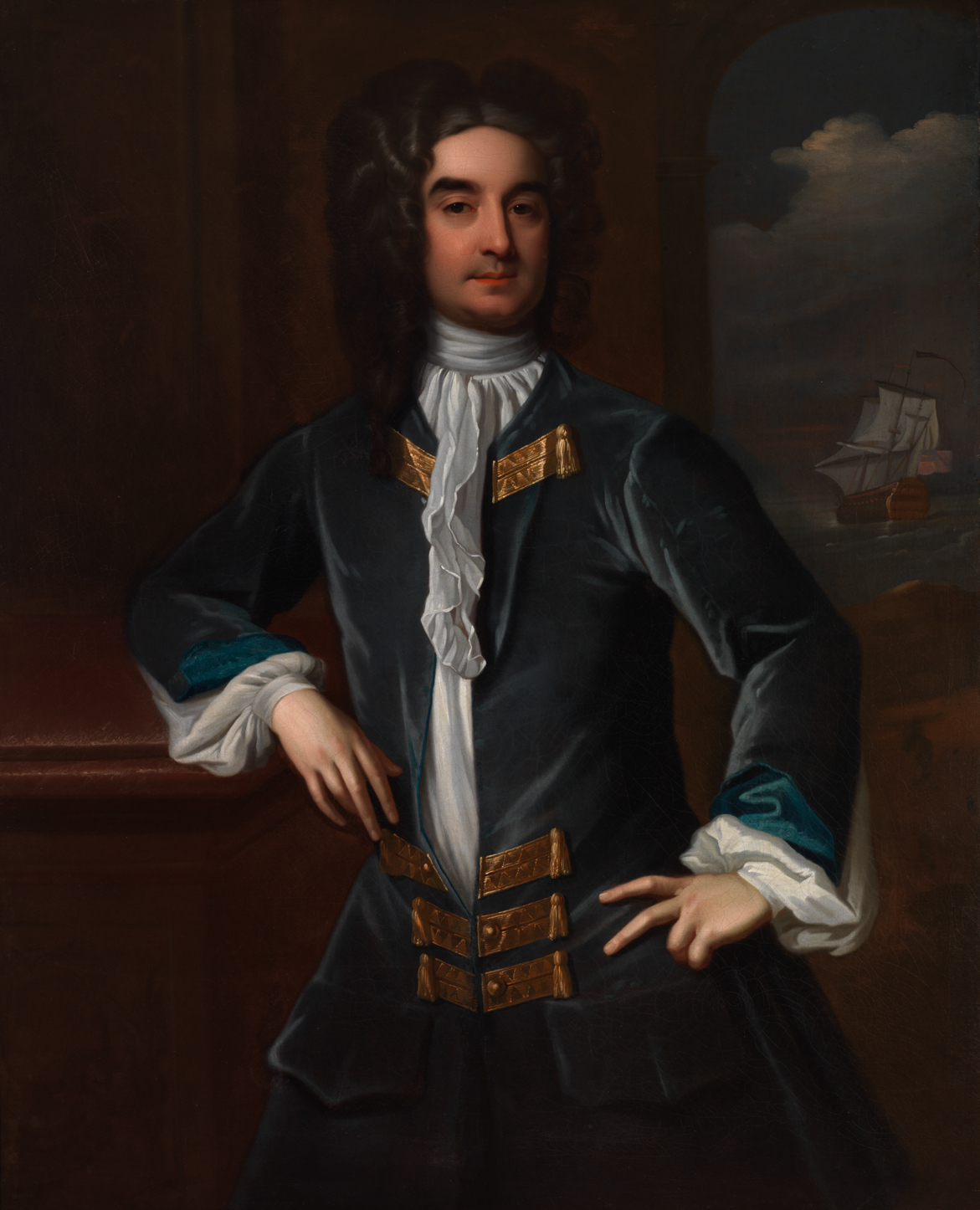
William Byrd II, a wealthy and influential planter, offered French refugees 10,000 acres to settle at what became known as Manakintown, on land abandoned by the Monacan Indians about 20 miles (32 km) above the falls of the James River.

Salle became a clerk of the parish, a captain of the militia, and justice of Henrico County, specifically chosen to handle cases of French Huguenots. Salle was a member of the vestry in 1714, 1715 and 1718. He was an "important merchant" and a "leading citizen". He petitioned William Byrd II for more land as a spokesman for the community. He said, "our families which are pretty numerous and the place we occupy quite limited, we find ourselves in the impossibility of procuring any situation for our children or even to have them instructed or give them any education." He asked King William of England to "withdraw us from a place where we suffer", due in large part to the lack of fertile soil. He asked that they be given land in Ireland. But land was not made available per that request.

Salle obtained about 230 acres by Lower Manakin Creek and on the south side of James River in Henrico County in 1711. In 1715, he acquired an additional 190 acres on the south side of the James River; It was a tract on the first 5,000 acres established for French refugees. Over the course of his life in Manakintown, he amassed sizeable property, including slaves and land. He was the first of the French refugees in Henrico County to own enslaved people.

== Marriage and children ==
Abraham Salle married Olive Perrault. (Note: Her surnames is also spelled Perault and Peraux.) She may have been the daughter of Daniel Perrault, captain of the ship Peter and Anthony that sailed to Virginia with Huguenots. They had one daughter and five sons. Before Salle moved to Manakintown, two sons were baptized in the French Church (L'Église française à la Nouvelle-Amsterdam) in New York. Abraham was born October 31, 1700, and Jacob was born July 28, 1701. Jacob was Baptized on August 6, 1701, with Jacob Baillergeau and Magdelene Peiret as godparents. His son, Abraham Salle Jr., appeared on the list of tithables along with his father in 1718.

Salle died in 1719. His estate was left to his children.

== Descendants ==
Abraham Salle, Justice of the Peace of Chesterfield County, and his cousin Jacob Salle, a yeoman, were descendants of immigrants Abraham and Olive Salle. Abraham Salle was a Sheriff in Chesterfield County from 1768 to 1769.

Salle's descendants have moved west to Kentucky and other states. The surnames are spelled Sallee, Salle, and Salley.
