= Gouverneur Morris Jr. =

American railroad executive

Gouverneur Morris II
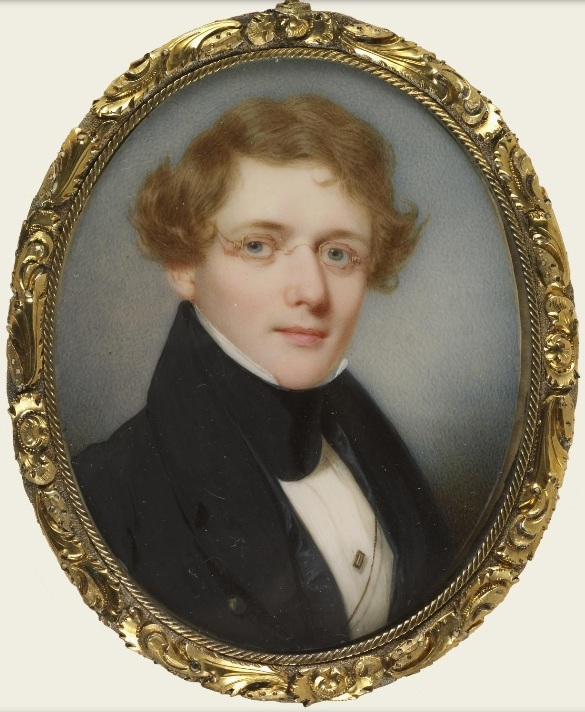
- Born: February 9, 1813; Morrisania, New York, U.S.
- Died: August 20, 1888 (aged 75); Bartow-on-the-Sound, Pelham, New York, U.S.
- Resting place: St. Ann's Episcopal Church (Bronx)
- Occupation: Railroad executive
- Political party: Republican
- Spouse: Martha Jefferson Cary
- Children: 3
- Parent(s): Gouverneur Morris; Ann Cary Randolph
- Relatives: Gouverneur Morris IV (grandson); Philip Bonsal (great-grandson)

Gouverneur Morris Jr. (February 9, 1813 – August 20, 1888) was an American railroad executive and the son of a founding father of the United States, Gouverneur Morris.

== Early life ==
Coat of Arms of Gouverneur Morris

Gouverneur Morris was born on February 9, 1813, Morrisania, Bronx, New York. He was the son of a founding father of the United States, Gouverneur Morris (1752–1816) and his wife, Ann Cary Randolph (1774–1837), nicknamed "Nancy".

== Career ==
Morris was one of the major entrepreneurs of the 19th century Bronx. As Vice President of the New York and Harlem River Railroad, he built the railroad now running along Park Avenue in New York City. In 1840, he donated St. Ann's Church as a family memorial. He promoted Port Morris as a commercial port, and donated land to skilled workers in 1848, to create an ideal workingman’s village if it were called Morrisania. That is today’s Morrisania neighborhood. He spent much of the later part of his career in Vermont, as president of the Vermont Valley Railroad.

He wasn't as active in politics as his famous father, but he was a founder of the Republican Party and attended its opening convention in 1854.

== Personal life ==
He married his first cousin Martha Jefferson Cary, daughter of writer Virginia Randolph Cary (1786–1852). Together they had three children: Gouverneur Morris III (1842–1897); Anne Cary Morris (1847–1926), who married Alfred Percival Maudslay (1850–1931), the British diplomat, explorer and archaeologist; and Peter Randolph Morris (1865–1934), who helped to establish the Overland Stage Line in Denver, Colorado.

After his death on August 20, 1888, in Bartow-on-the-Sound, Pelham, New York, Morris was buried at St. Ann's Episcopal Church in the Bronx.

=== Descendants ===
His grandson, Gouverneur Morris IV (1876–1953), was an author of pulp novels and short stories during the early twentieth century. Several of his works were adapted into films, including the famous Lon Chaney film, The Penalty in 1920.

His granddaughter, Henrietta Fairfax Morris, married Stephen Bonsal (1865–1951) a journalist and war correspondent who won the 1945 Pulitzer Prize for History.

His great-grandson, Philip Bonsal (1903–1995), was a diplomat with the U.S. Department of State who served as the United States Ambassador to Cuba from February 1959 until October 1960.

== See also ==
- Randolph family of Virginia
- List of United States political families
