= Gouverneur Morris =

American Founding Father and politician

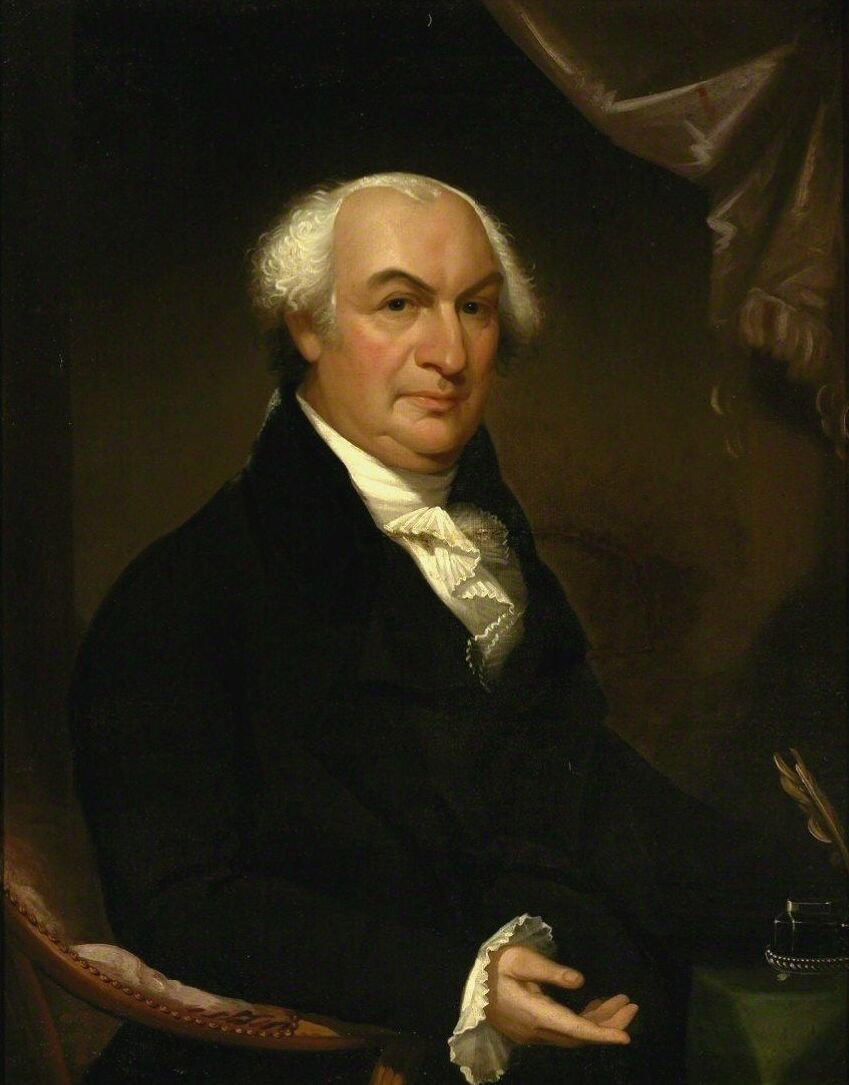
- Portrait by Ezra Ames, c. 1817

United States Senator from New York
- In office April 3, 1800 – March 3, 1803
- Preceded by: James Watson
- Succeeded by: Theodorus Bailey

4th United States Minister to France
- In office June 3, 1792 – April 9, 1794
- President: George Washington
- Preceded by: William Short
- Succeeded by: James Monroe

Personal details
- Born: January 31, 1752 The Bronx, Province of New York, British America
- Died: November 6, 1816 (aged 64) The Bronx, New York, U.S.
- Resting place: Saint Ann's Episcopal Church, The Bronx
- Party: Federalist
- Spouse: Ann Cary ("Nancy") Randolph (m. 1809)
- Children: Gouverneur Morris II
- Education: Academy of Philadelphia, King's College (AB, AM)
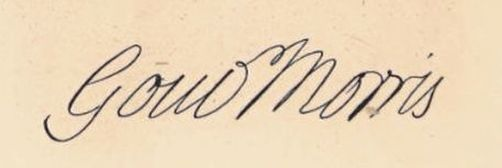
- Signature

Gouverneur Morris (/ɡʌvərnɪər ˈmɒrɪs/ guh-vər-NEER MOR-ris; January 31, 1752 – November 6, 1816) was an American statesman, a Founding Father of the United States, and a signatory to the Articles of Confederation and the United States Constitution. He wrote the Preamble to the United States Constitution and has been called the "Penman of the Constitution". While most Americans still thought of themselves as citizens of their respective states, Morris advanced the idea of being a citizen of a single union of states. He was also one of the most outspoken opponents of slavery among those who were present at the Constitutional Congress. He represented New York in the United States Senate from 1800 to 1803.

Morris was born into a wealthy landowning family in what is now New York City. After attending King's College (now Columbia University) he studied law under Judge William Smith and earned admission to the bar. He was elected to the New York Provincial Congress before serving in the Continental Congress. After losing re-election to Congress, he moved to Philadelphia and became the assistant U.S. Superintendent of Finance. He represented Pennsylvania at the 1787 Constitutional Convention in which he advocated a strong central government. He served on the committee that wrote the final draft of the United States Constitution.

After the ratification of the Constitution, Morris served as Minister Plenipotentiary to France. He criticized the French Revolution and the execution of Marie Antoinette. Morris returned to the United States in 1798 and won election to the Senate in 1800. Affiliating with the Federalist Party, he lost re-election in 1803. After leaving the Senate, he served as chairman of the Erie Canal Commission, which constructed the Erie Canal, and was one of the commissioners that created the Commissioners' Plan of 1811 to establish New York's street grid.

== Early life ==
Coat of Arms of Gouverneur Morris

Morris was born on January 31, 1752, the son of Lewis Morris Jr. (1698–1762) and his second wife, Sarah Gouverneur (1714–1786). Morris's first name derived from his mother's surname; she was from a Huguenot family that had first moved to Holland and then to New Amsterdam. In both Dutch and French, Gouverneur means "Governor".

Morris's half-brother Lewis Morris was a signer of the Declaration of Independence. Another half-brother, Staats Long Morris, was a Loyalist major-general in the British Army during the American Revolution, and Morris's grandfather, Lewis Morris, was the chief justice of New York and British governor of New Jersey.

His nephew, Lewis Richard Morris, served in the Vermont Legislature and in the United States Congress. His grandnephew was William M. Meredith, who was United States Secretary of the Treasury under Zachary Taylor.

Morris's father, Lewis Morris, was a wealthy landowner and judge.

Gouverneur Morris was born on the family estate, Morrisania, on the north side of the Harlem River, which was then in Westchester County but is now part of the Bronx. Morris, a gifted scholar, enrolled at King's College (now Columbia University in New York City) at age 12. He graduated in 1768 and received a master's degree in 1771. He studied law with Judge William Smith and attained admission to the bar in 1775.

== Career ==
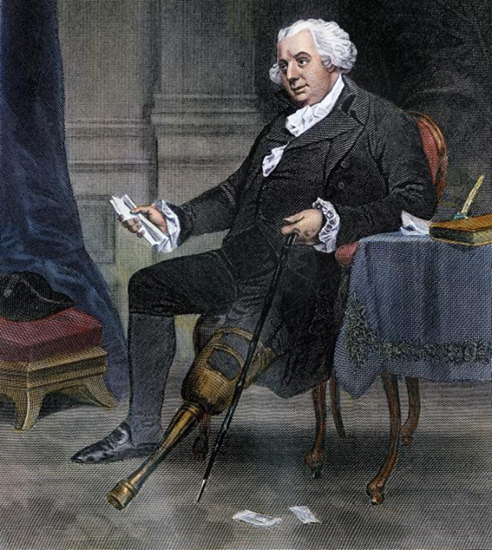
Portrait of Gouverneur Morris by American painter Alonzo Chappel (circa 1860s)

On May 8, 1775, Morris was elected to represent his family household in southern Westchester County (now Bronx County), in the New York Provincial Congress. As a member of the congress, he, along with most of his fellow delegates, concentrated on turning the colony into an independent state. However, his advocacy of independence brought him into conflict with his family, as well as with his mentor, William Smith, who had abandoned the Patriot cause when it pressed toward independence. Morris was a member of the New York State Assembly in 1777–78.

After the Battle of Long Island in August 1776, British forces occupied New York City. Morris's mother, a Loyalist, gave his family's estate, which was across the Harlem River from Manhattan, to the British for military use.

=== Continental Congress ===
Morris was appointed as a delegate to the Continental Congress and took his seat in Congress on 28 January 1778. He was selected to a committee in charge of coordinating reforms of the military with George Washington. After witnessing the army encamped at Valley Forge, he was so appalled by the conditions of the troops that he became the spokesman for the Continental Army in Congress and subsequently helped enact substantial reforms in its training, methods, and financing. He also signed the Articles of Confederation in 1778 and was its youngest signer.

In 1778, when the Conway Cabal was at its peak, some members of the Continental Congress attempted a no-confidence vote against George Washington. If it had succeeded, Washington would have been court-martialed and dismissed as Commander-in-Chief of the Continental Army. Gouverneur Morris cast the decisive tie-breaking vote in favor of keeping Washington as Commander-in-Chief.

=== Lawyer and merchant ===
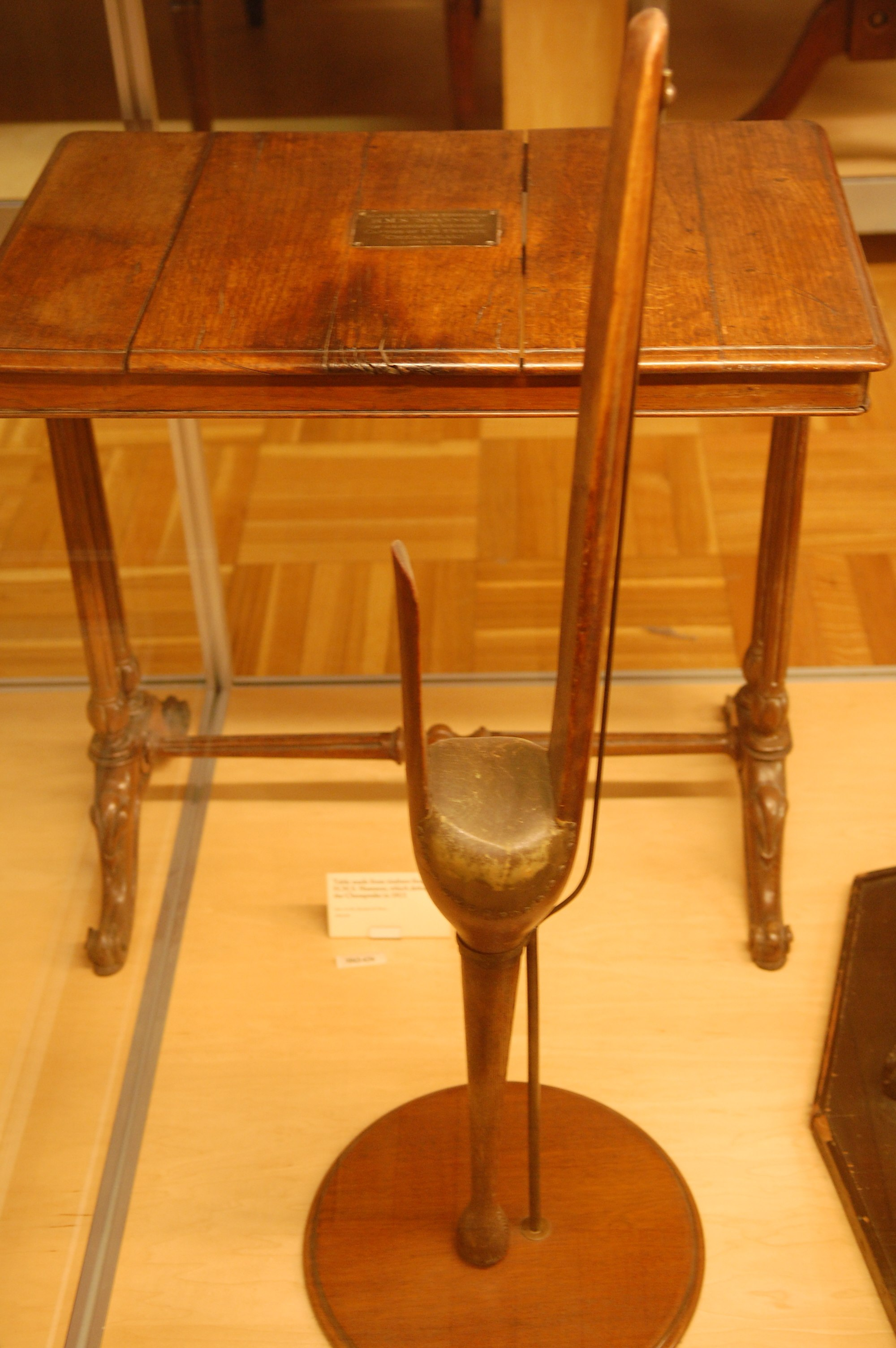
Wooden leg of Gouverneur Morris. New-York Historical Society.

In 1779, he was defeated for re-election to Congress, largely because his advocacy of a strong central government was at odds with the decentralist views prevalent in New York. Defeated in his home state, he moved to Philadelphia, Pennsylvania, to work as a lawyer and merchant.

In 1780, Morris had a carriage accident in Philadelphia, and his left leg was amputated below the knee. Despite an automatic exemption from military duty because of his disability and his service in the legislature, he joined a special "briefs" club for the protection of New York City, a forerunner of the modern New York Guard.

=== Public office and Constitutional Convention ===
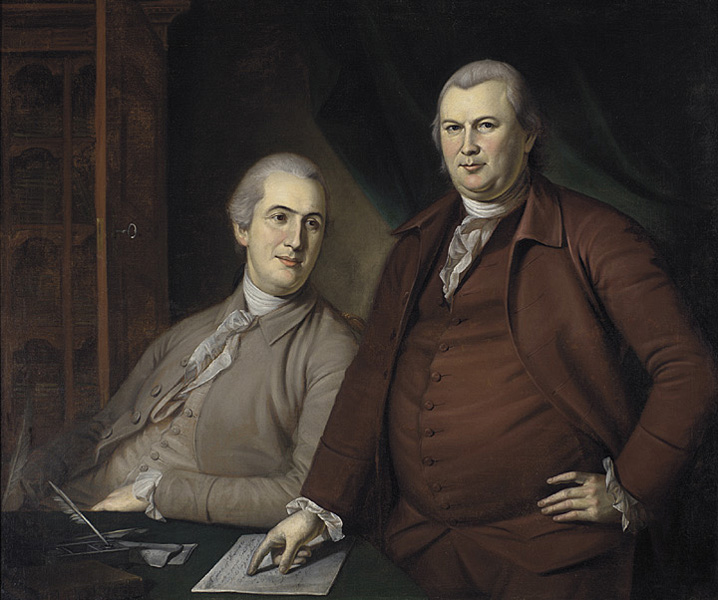
Gouverneur Morris and Robert Morris. Charles Willson Peale, 1783.

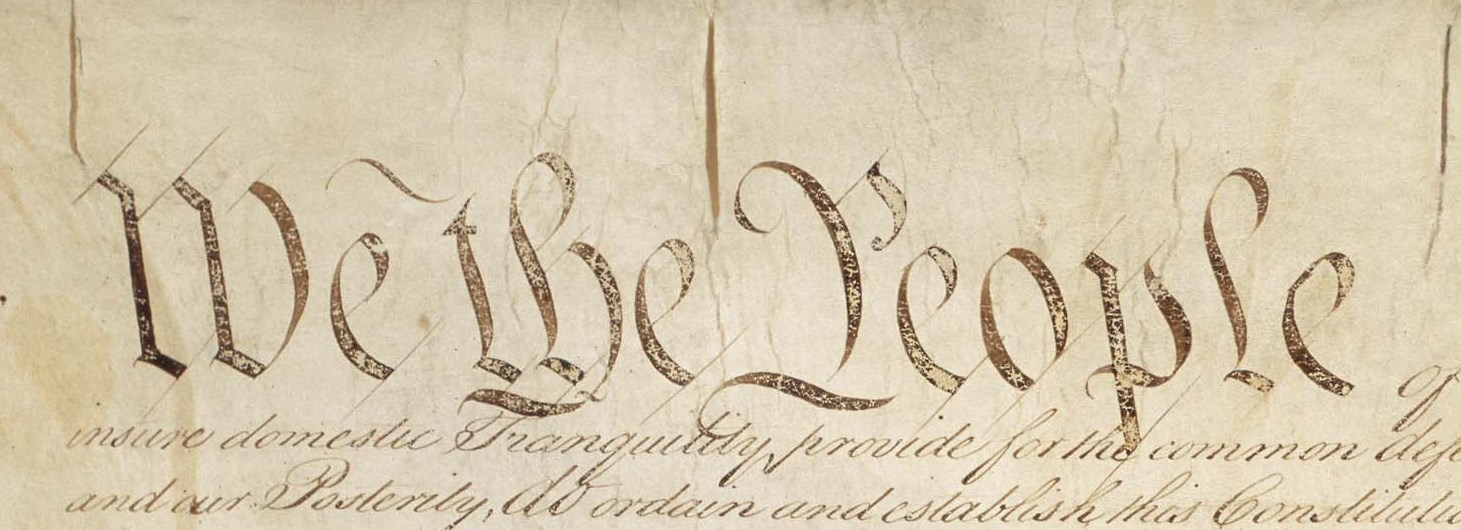
Morris wrote the Preamble to the United States Constitution.

In Philadelphia, he was appointed assistant superintendent of finance of the United States and served under Robert Morris (no relation). He was selected as a Pennsylvania delegate to the Constitutional Convention in 1787. During the Convention, he was a friend and ally of Washington and others who favored a strong central government. Morris was elected to serve on the Committee of Style and Arrangement, a committee of five (chaired by William Samuel Johnson), which drafted the final language of the proposed constitution. Morris has been credited by most historians with authorship of the final version of the preamble, including changing the opening line "We, the People of the States" to "We, the People of the United States." Catherine Drinker Bowen, in her 1966 book Miracle at Philadelphia, called Morris the committee's "amanuensis," meaning that it was his pen that was responsible for most of the draft and its final polished form.

Morris opposed admitting new western states on an equal basis with the existing eastern states for fear that the interior "wilderness" could not furnish "enlightened" national statesmen. Madison's summary of Morris's speech at the Convention on 11 July 1787 stated that his view "relative to the Western Country had not changed his opinion on that head. Among other objections it must be apparent they would not be able to furnish men equally enlightened, to share in the administration of our common interests." His reason given for that was regional: "The Busy haunts of men not the remote wilderness, was the proper School of political Talents. If the Western people get the power into their hands they will ruin the Atlantic interests." In that fear, Morris turned out to be in the minority. Jon Elster has suggested that Morris's attempt to limit the future power of the West was a strategic move designed to limit the power of slaveholding states because Morris believed that slavery would predominate in new Western states.

At the Convention, he gave more speeches than any other delegate, a total of 173. As a matter of principle, he often vigorously defended the right of anyone to practice his chosen religion without interference, and he argued to include such language in the Constitution.

During the Convention Gouverneur Morris boarded at Miss Dally's boarding house, along with Alexander Hamilton and Elbridge Gerry. Based on this discovery, an application was submitted to the State of Pennsylvania to install a historic marker on Market and 3rd Street in Philadelphia to honor Miss Dally and the location where the "Penman of the Constitution" boarded. Researchers have theorized that the five-member Committee on Style and Arrangement, which included Gouverneur Morris, Alexander Hamilton and James Madison, may have met at Miss Dally's boarding house between September 8 to September 12, which would have been the most convenient location for all five delegates.

=== Opposition to slavery ===
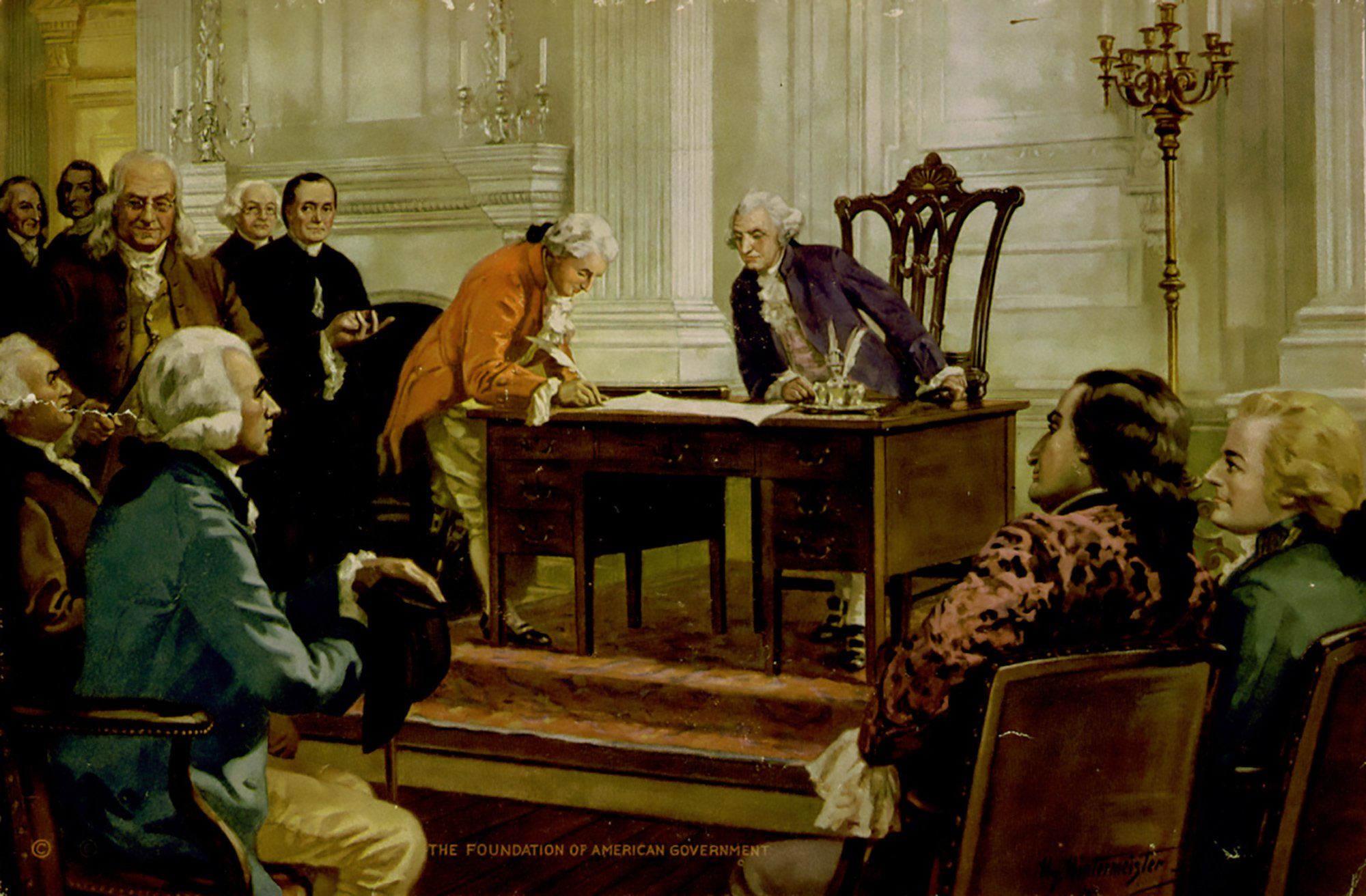
Gouverneur Morris signs the Constitution in John Henry Hintermeister's 1925 painting, Foundation of the American Government.

Gouverneur Morris was one of the few delegates at the Philadelphia Convention who spoke openly against domestic slavery. According to James Madison, who took notes at the Convention, Morris spoke openly against slavery on 8 August 1787 and stated that it was incongruous to say that a slave was both a man and property at the same time:

He [Morris] never would concur in upholding domestic slavery. It was a nefarious institution. It was the curse of heaven on the states where it prevailed. Compare the free regions of the Middle States, where a rich & noble cultivation marks the prosperity & happiness of the people, with the misery & poverty which overspread the barren wastes of Va. Maryd. & the other States having slaves.... Proceed southwardly, and every step you take, through the great regions of slaves, presents a desert increasing with the increasing proportion of these wretched beings.

Upon what principle is it that the slaves shall be computed in the representation? Are they men? Then make them citizens, and let them vote. Are they property? Why, then, is no other property included? The Houses in this city [Philadelphia] are worth more than all the wretched slaves which cover the rice swamps of South Carolina.

According to Madison, Morris felt that the U.S. Constitution's purpose was to protect the rights of humanity, which was incongruous with promoting slavery:

The admission of slaves into the Representation when fairly explained comes to this: that the inhabitant of Georgia and S. C. who goes to the Coast of Africa, and in defiance of the most sacred laws of humanity tears away his fellow creatures from their dearest connections & damns them to the most cruel bondages, shall have more votes in a Govt. instituted for protection of the rights of mankind, than the Citizen of Pa. or N. Jersey who views with a laudable horror, so nefarious a practice.

=== Minister Plenipotentiary to France ===
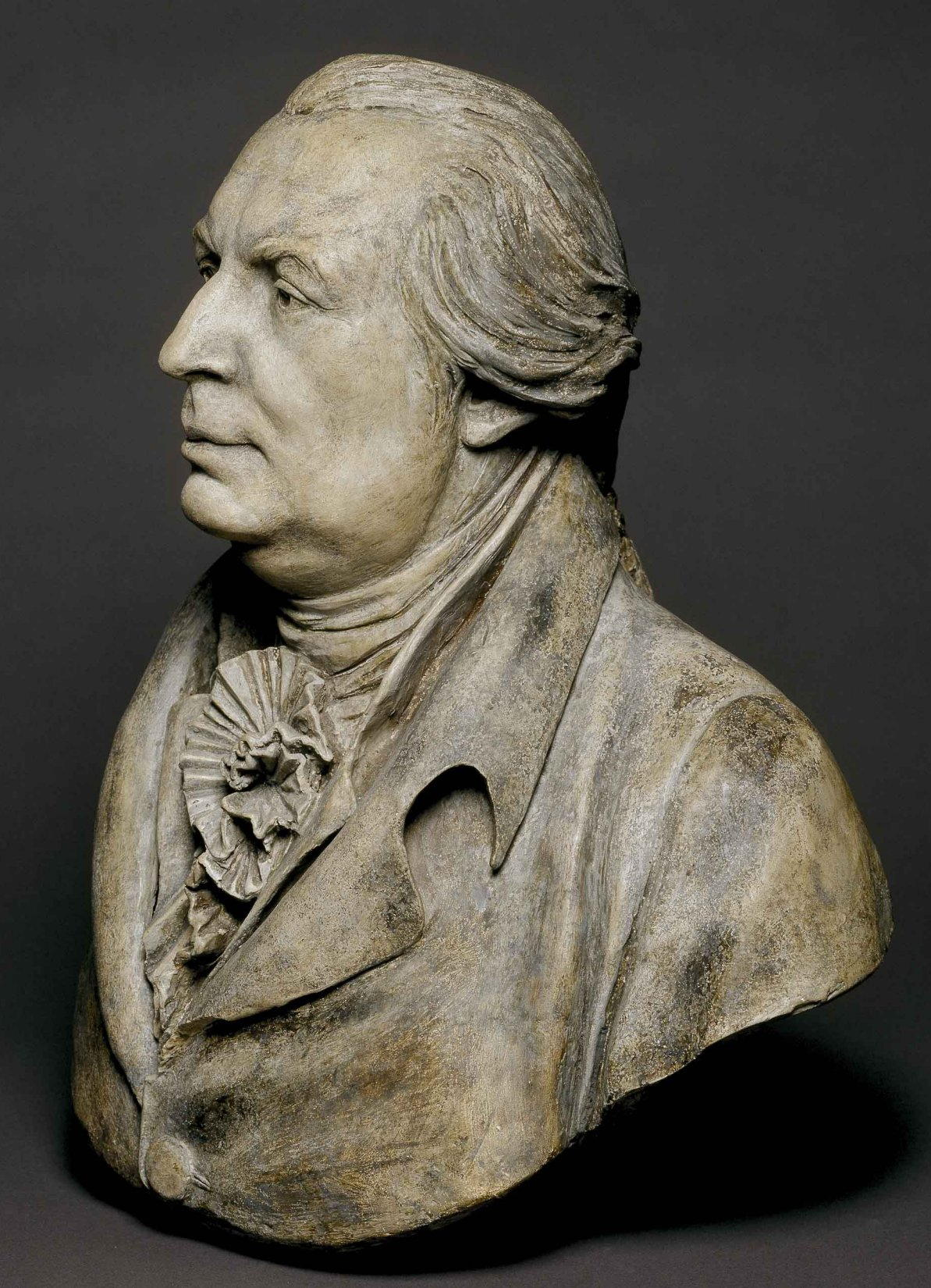
Gouverneur Morris portrait bust by Jean-Antoine Houdon, 1789, Paris

Morris went to France on business in 1789 and served as Minister Plenipotentiary to France from 1792 to 1794. His diaries during that time have become a valuable chronicle of the French Revolution and capture much of that era's turbulence and violence and document his affairs with women there. Compared to Thomas Jefferson, Morris was far more critical of the French Revolution and considerably more sympathetic to the deposed queen consort, Marie Antoinette. Commenting on her grandfather's sometimes Tory-minded outlook of the world, Anne Cary Morris stated, "His creed was rather to form the government to suit the condition, character, manners, and habits of the people. In France this opinion led him to take the monarchical view, firmly believing that a republican form of government would not suit the French character."

Morris was "the only foreign representative who remained in his post throughout the worst days of the Terror." On one occasion, when Morris "found himself the center of a hostile mob in favor of hanging him on the nearest lamppost, he unfastened his wooden leg, brandished it above his head, and proclaimed himself an American who had lost a limb fighting for liberty," upon which "[t]he mob's suspicions melted into enthusiastic cheers" (even though, as noted above, Morris had in fact lost his leg as a result of a carriage accident).

While Morris was minister, the Marquis de Lafayette, who had been an important participant in the American Revolution, was exiled from France and his family imprisoned, and Thomas Paine, another important figure, was arrested and imprisoned in France. Morris's efforts on their behalf have been criticized as desultory and insufficient. After a change of the French government and after Morris was replaced as minister, his successor, James Monroe, secured Paine's release.

=== U.S. Senate ===
He returned to the United States in 1798 and was elected in April 1800, as a Federalist, to the U.S. Senate, filling the vacancy caused by the resignation of James Watson. Morris served from May 3, 1800 to March 3, 1803 and was defeated for re-election in February 1803.

=== Later career ===
On 4 July 1806, he was elected an honorary member of the New York Society of the Cincinnati.

After leaving the Senate, he served as Chairman of the Erie Canal Commission from 1810 to 1813. The Erie Canal helped to transform New York City into a financial capital, the possibilities of which were apparent to Morris when he said that "the proudest empire in Europe is but a bubble compared to what America will be, must be, in the course of two centuries, perhaps of one."

He was one of the three men who drew up the Commissioners' Plan of 1811, which laid out the Manhattan street grid.

Morris's final public act was to support the Hartford Convention during the War of 1812. He even pushed for secession to create a separate New York-New England Confederation because he saw the war as a result of slaveholders, who wanted to expand their territory. In the words of the biographer Richard Brookhiser, "The man who wrote the Constitution judged it to be a failure and was willing to scrap it."

Morris was elected a member of the American Antiquarian Society in 1814.

== Personal life ==
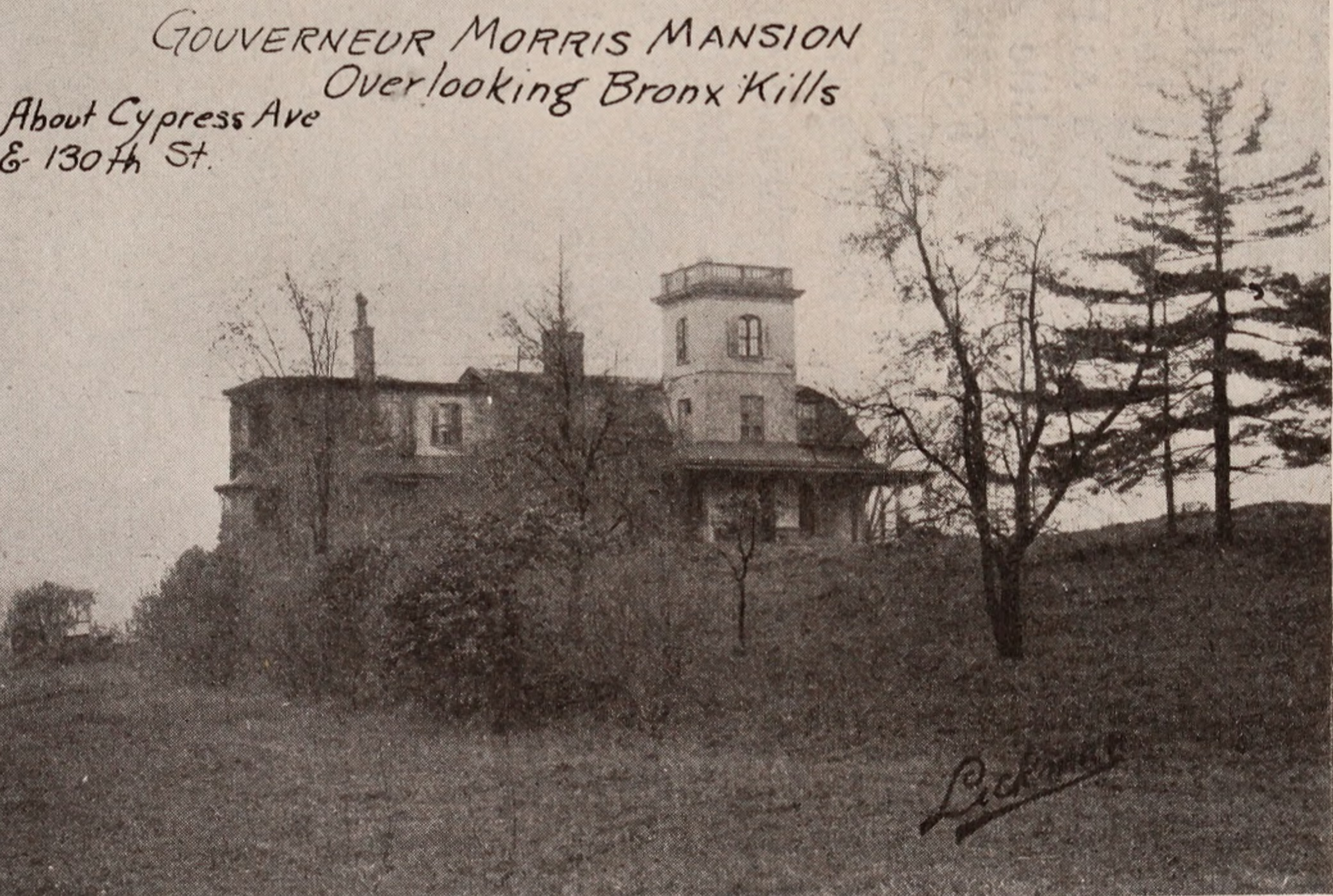
Morris's home in 1897

Until he married late in life, Morris's diary tells of a series of affairs. His lovers included the French novelist Adelaide Filleul and the American poet and novelist Sarah Wentworth Apthorp Morton.

In 1809, at age 57, Morris married 35-year-old Ann Cary Randolph (1774–1837), nicknamed "Nancy," who was the daughter of Ann Cary and Thomas Mann Randolph Sr. and the sister of Thomas Mann Randolph Jr. Thomas Mann Randolph Jr. was the husband of Thomas Jefferson's daughter, Martha Jefferson Randolph. Nancy lived near Farmville, Virginia, with her sister Judith and Judith's husband, Richard Randolph, on a plantation called Bizarre. In April 1793, Richard Randolph and Nancy were accused of murdering a newborn baby who was said to be Nancy's; presumably, she had been having an affair with Richard. Richard stood trial and was defended by Patrick Henry and John Marshall, who obtained an acquittal. Richard Randolph died suddenly in 1796; both sisters were suspected, but nothing was proven. Nancy remained at Bizarre after her brother-in-law's death but Judith asked her to leave in 1805.

Nancy traveled north and lived in Connecticut before she agreed in 1809 to work as a housekeeper for Morris, whom she had known previously. They soon decided to marry; Morris was apparently undisturbed by the rumors that had caused Nancy to leave Virginia. By all accounts, their marriage was a happy one; they had a son, Gouverneur Morris Jr., who went on to have a long career as a railroad executive.

== Death and legacy ==
Morris died on November 6, 1816, after he had caused himself internal injuries and an infection while using a piece of whale baleen as a catheter in an attempt to clear a blockage in his urinary tract. He died at the family estate, Morrisania, and was buried at St. Ann's Church in The Bronx.

Morris's great-grandson, also named Gouverneur Morris (1876–1953), was an author of pulp novels and short stories in the early 20th century. Several of his works were adapted into films, including the Lon Chaney film The Penalty in 1920.

Morris established himself as an important landowner in northern New York, where the Town of Gouverneur, Village of Gouverneur, and Village of Morristown in St. Lawrence County are named after him.

In 1943, a United States Liberty ship, the SS Gouverneur Morris, was launched. She was scrapped in 1974.

=== Criticism ===
It is said by some that Morris was "an aristocrat to the core," who believed that "there never was, nor ever will be a civilized Society without an Aristocracy." It is also alleged that he thought that common people were incapable of self-government because he feared that the poor would sell their votes to the rich and that voting should be restricted to property owners. This aligns with how Morris positioned himself on the side of the monarchy during the French Revolution, writing particularly fondly of Marie Antoinette in his diaries. (Note: In a May 4, 1789, diary entry, regarding the opening of the Estates General of 1789 by Louis XVI, Morris wrote: "After the speech is over the King rises to depart, and receives a long and affecting 'Vive le roi.' The Queen rises, and to my great satisfaction she hears for the first time in several months the sound of, 'Vive la Reine.'")

Duff Cooper wrote of Morris that although he "had warmly espoused the cause of the colonists in the American War of Independence, he retained a cynically aristocratic view of life and a profound contempt for democratic theories."

== See also ==
- France–United States relations
- Influence of the American Revolution on the French Revolution

Diplomatic posts
Preceded by William Short	U.S. Minister Plenipotentiary to France; 1792–1794	Succeeded by James Monroe
U.S. Senate
Preceded by James Watson	U.S. senator (Class 1) from New York; 1800–1803; Served alongside: John Armstrong, Jr., De Witt Clinton	Succeeded by Theodorus Bailey
