= Heard (surname) =

Heard is an English surname for someone who once worked as a herdsman. Notable people with the surname include:

== People with the surname ==
- Albert Heard (1833–1890), American merchant, diplomat and author
- Alexander Heard (1917–2009), American chancellor
- Alexander S. Heard, American editor and author
- Amber Heard (born 1986), American actress
- Andreao Heard, American record producer and songwriter also known as "Fanatic"
- Andrew Heard (1958–1993), British artist
- Ann Heard (1770–1797), English actress
- Anneliese Heard (born 1981), Welsh triathlete
- Augustine Heard (1785–1868), American businessman
- Augustine Heard II (1827–1905), American diplomat
- Ben Heard, Australian environmental consultant and nuclear power advocate
- Betsy Heard (1759–c. 1812), Euro–African slave trader and merchant
- Bob Heard (born 1949), Australian rules footballer
- Bruce Heard (born 1957), French–American game designer
- Charlie Heard (1872–1945), American baseball player
- Clarrie Heard (1906–1990), New Zealand swimmer
- Dallas Heard (born 1985), American politician
- Daphne Heard (1904–1983), English actress and acting teacher
- Denatay Heard (born 1984), American football player
- Dwight B. Heard (1869–1929), American farmer, landowner and businessman
- Edith Heard (born 1965), British geneticist and academic
- Elizabeth Heard (born 1775), English actress
- Fats Heard (1923–1987), American musician
- Floyd Heard (born 1966), American track and field sprinter
- Fred W. Heard (born 1940), American educator and pastor
- Gabre Heard, Ethiopian army general
- Gar Heard (born 1948), American basketball player and coach
- Gerald Heard (1889–1971), British writer and philosopher
- Grant Heard (born 1978), American football coach
- Harry Heard (1920–1978), Australian rules footballer
- Hartley Heard (born 1947), English cricketer and educator
- Herman Heard (born 1961), American football player
- Isaac Heard (1730–1822), British officer of arms, sailor, and merchant
- Isaac V. D. Heard (1834–1913), American lawyer and politician
- Jay Heard (1920–1999), American baseball player
- J. C. Heard (1917–1988), American musician
- Jerrod Heard, American football player
- Jerry Heard (born 1947), American golfer
- John Heard (disambiguation), multiple people
- Josephine D. Heard (1861–1924), American poet and educator
- Josh Heard (born 1994), Welsh footballer
- Lance Heard (born 2004), American football player
- Larry Heard (born 1960), American record producer and musician
- Lou Heard (1909–1987), Canadian politician
- Maie Bartlett Heard (1868–1951), American collector and philanthropist
- Mark Heard (1951–1992), American singer, songwriter and record producer
- Michelle Clark-Heard (born 1968), basketball coach
- Mitchell Heard (born 1992), Canadian ice hockey player
- Nadine Agyemang-Heard (born 2002), Italian rower
- Nathan Heard (1936–2004), American author
- Oscar E. Heard (1856–1940), American jurist
- Pat Heard (born 1960), English footballer
- Paul F. Heard (1913–1964), American producer, director, and scriptwriter
- Peter Heard (died 2026), English football administrator and surveyor
- Raymond Heard (born 1935), South African–Canadian journalist, editor, media executive and political strategist
- Robert Heard (1930–2014), American journalist and author
- Rod Heard II, American football player
- Ronnie Heard (born 1976), American football player
- Sarah Heard (born 1983), Australian rower
- Sarah Harper Heard (1853–1919), American librarian, educator, and activist
- Shane Heard (born 1958), Australian rules footballer
- Stephen Heard (1740–1815), American politician
- Steve Heard (born 1962), English middle-distance runner
- Thomas Pinckney "Skipper" Heard (1898–1980), American athletic director
- Tom Heard (born 1993), English rugby player
- Tracy Maxwell Heard (born 1963), American politician
- Wendy Heard, American author
- Will Heard (born 1991), English singer and songwriter
- William Heard (disambiguation), multiple people

== Fictional characters with the surname ==
- Beluga Heard, character in the manga series Black Cat
