= T. Jefferson Coolidge =

American businessman and diplomat

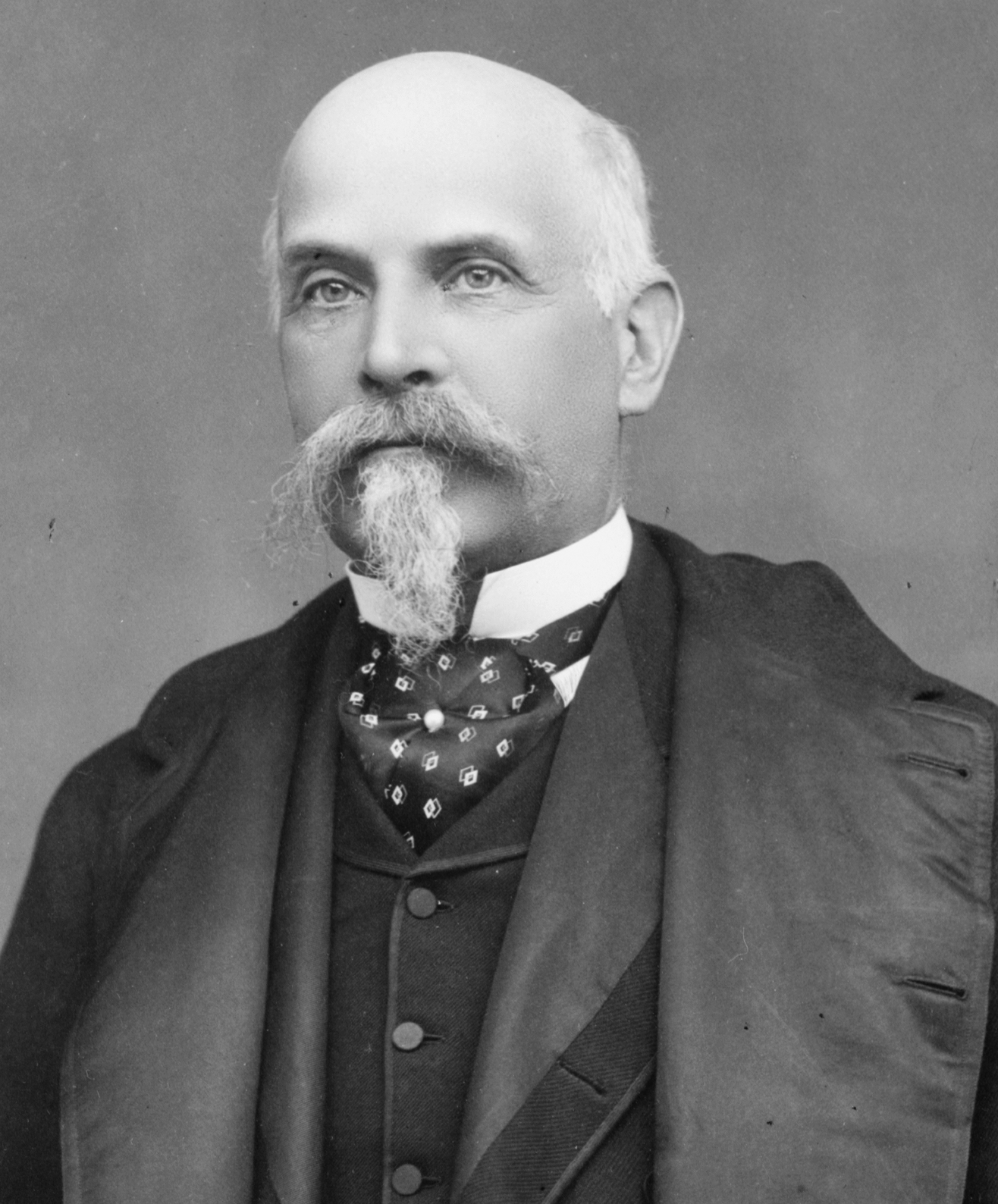
- Coolidge in 1889 or 1890

United States Minister to France
- In office May 12, 1892 – May 4, 1893
- Appointed by: Benjamin Harrison
- Preceded by: Whitelaw Reid
- Succeeded by: James Biddle Eustis

Personal details
- Born: Thomas Jefferson Coolidge; August 26, 1831 Boston, Massachusetts, U.S.
- Died: November 17, 1920 (aged 89) Boston, Massachusetts, U.S.
- Party: Republican
- Spouse: Mehitable Sullivan Appleton (m. 1852; died 1901)
- Relations: Archibald Cary Coolidge (nephew)
- Children: 4
- Parent(s): Joseph Coolidge; Ellen Wayles Randolph
- Education: Harvard University (1850)

Thomas Jefferson Coolidge (August 26, 1831 – November 17, 1920) was a U.S. ambassador and a leading Boston businessman. He was also a co-founder of General Electric.

== Early life ==
Coolidge was born to a Joseph Coolidge (1798–1879) and Ellen Wayles (Randolph) Coolidge (1796–1876). He was the brother of six siblings.

He was born to a prominent Boston Brahmin family and was a great-grandson of the 3rd United States President Thomas Jefferson, through his maternal grandparents, Thomas Mann Randolph Jr. and Martha Jefferson Randolph. His uncles were Thomas Jefferson Randolph, George Wythe Randolph, His father was a distant relative of Calvin Coolidge. He was an uncle to Archibald Cary Coolidge (1866–1928) through his older brother, Joseph Randolph Coolidge.

Coolidge was educated in private schools in Europe, and graduated from Harvard in 1850.

== Career ==
Coolidge was involved in numerous textile mills, and banks. In 1853, he formed a partnership with Joseph Peabody Gardner, the father of U.S. Representative Augustus Peabody Gardner, in the East India trade. In 1875, he became the manager of the largest textile mill in America, the Amoskeag Mill in Manchester New Hampshire. Coolidge turned his attention to financing the rapidly growing industrial economy, with major interests in textiles banking, railroads, publishing and electricity.

In 1880, he ended his manufacturing career and "took up railroading." Coolidge served as president of the Atchison, Topeka and Santa Fe Railway. In the early 1890s he retired from the railroads and returned to the Amoskeag Company, becoming president in 1898. He organized the United Fruit Company, of which his son, Thomas J. Coolidge, Jr., was president. Coolidge was involved in numerous civic enterprises Boston area, especially the design of the region's park system.

=== Public service ===
A Republican, he was appointed by Benjamin Harrison to succeed Whitelaw Reid as United States Ambassador to France on May 12, 1892, a role his great-grandfather had held from May 1785 to September 1789. Coolidge presented his credentials on June 10, 1892 and he presented his recall on May 4, 1893, terminating his mission. In 1898 and 1899, he was a member of the American delegation to the commission to resolve the Alaska boundary dispute.

Historian Ernest May says Coolidge was, "a prototype member of what today we call the foreign policy establishment."

=== Philanthropy ===
Coolidge donated the Grand Army Hall and a public library to the town of Manchester-by-the-Sea, Massachusetts that cost more than $40,000. At Harvard, where he was an overseer from 1886 to 1897, he donated the Jefferson Research Laboratory and a chemical laboratory for quantitative analysis (as a memorial to his son), which all together cost over $165,000. In 1889, he gave another $5,000 to Harvard to be used as a prize for intercollegiate debates.

In 1898, Coolidge donated a collection of Thomas Jefferson's personal papers to the Massachusetts Historical Society in Boston. The collection contained more than 8,000 items: Correspondence, including 3,280 letters that Jefferson had written and 4,630 letters that he had received; Jefferson's garden book (1766-1824) and farm book (1774-1824); annotated almanacs from 1771-1776; account books for 1783-1790; manuscript expense accounts from 1804-1825; notes on the weather spanning the years 1782-1826; plans of American forts in 1765; law treatises, 1778-1788; legal papers, 1770-1772; and Jefferson's 1783 catalog of his personal library.

== Personal life ==
In 1852, he married Mehitable "Hetty" Sullivan Appleton (1831–1901), daughter of William Appleton, a leading financier of the New England cotton textile industry. They owned a residence in Boston and a summer home at Coolidge's Point in Manchester-by-the-Sea, Massachusetts. Together, they were the parents of:

- Marian Appleton Coolidge (1853–1924), who married Lucius M. Sargent (1848–1893), a son of Horace Binney Sargent and grandson of Lucius Manlius Sargent.
- Eleonora Randolph Coolidge (1856–1912), who married Frederick Richard Sears (1855–1939) grandson of David Sears (America)
- Sarah Lawrence Coolidge (1858–1922), who married New York State Senator Thomas Newbold (1849–1929).
- Thomas Jefferson Coolidge, Jr. (1863–1912), who graduated from Harvard in 1884, established the Old Colony Trust Company and was the head until his death in 1912.

Coolidge died at his home, 315 Dartmouth St. in Boston, Massachusetts, on November 17, 1920.

He purchased El Jaleo by John Singer Sargent and gifted it to Isabella Stewart Gardner in 1914.

=== Descendants ===
Through his son, he was the grandfather of Thomas Jefferson Coolidge III, Armory Coolidge and William A. Coolidge. Through his daughter Sarah, he was the grandfather of Thomas Jefferson Newbold, who married Katherine Hubbard in 1914.

A granddaughter, Eleonora Sears, became a prominent American sportswoman.

The Coolidge family donated 42 acres of land to The Trustees of Reservations in 1990 and 1991. The donated land is now part of the Coolidge Reservation.

Diplomatic posts
Preceded by Whitelaw Reid	United States; Ambassador to France; 1892–1893	Succeeded by James Biddle Eustis
Business positions
Preceded by Thomas Nickerson (railroad executive)	President of Atchison, Topeka and Santa Fe Railway; 1880–1881	Succeeded by William Barstow Strong
