= Cornelia Jefferson Randolph =

Granddaughter of US President Thomas Jefferson

Personal details
- Born: July 26, 1799 Monticello, Virginia, U.S.
- Died: February 24, 1871 (aged 71) Alexandria, Virginia, U.S.
- Parents: Thomas Mann Randolph Jr. (father); Martha Jefferson (mother)

Cornelia Jefferson Randolph (July 26, 1799 – February 24, 1871) was a granddaughter of United States President Thomas Jefferson. She also was the daughter of Acting First Lady Martha Jefferson Randolph and Governor of Virginia Thomas Mann Randolph Jr.

== Life ==
Coat of Arms of William Randolph

Cornelia Jefferson Randolph was born on July 26, 1799, at Monticello, the fifth child of Thomas Mann Randolph and Jefferson's daughter Martha Jefferson Randolph. Jefferson wrote to her even before she could write her own reply, sending her children's poems he cut from newspapers and magazines. When she was older, Jefferson taught her architectural drawing, and her architectural renderings of the University of Virginia (a school designed by Jefferson himself) still exist. She also learned painting and sculpture. In 1817, Jefferson wrote that Randolph and her sister Ellen were "the severest students I have ever met with. they never leave their room but to come to meals. about twilight of the evening, we sally out with the owls & bats, and take our evening exercise on the terras."

Shy and disdainful of frivolous courting rituals, Randolph never married. She lived at Monticello and then Edge Hill, the home of her brother Thomas Jefferson Randolph. In 1825, Randolph complained to her sister "I wish I could do something to support myself instead of this unprofitable drudgery of keeping house here. But I suppose not until we sink entirely will it do for the granddaughters of Thomas Jefferson to take in work of keep a school." Societal conventions regarding female roles prevented Randolph from fully exercising her talents, but after Jefferson's death she and other family members operated a school at Edge Hill.

Randolph translated and edited The Parlor Gardener: A Treatise on the House Culture of Ornamental Plants: Translated from the French and Adapted to American Use, published in 1861.

Following the American Civil War, Randolph lived at the home of her niece Martha Jefferson Trist Burke in Alexandria, Virginia, where she died on February 24, 1871.

A terra-cotta bust of Cornelia Randolph by sculptor William Coffee is in the South Square Room of Monticello.
