= Augustine Heard & Co. =

Major nineteenth-century American trading firm in Qing China

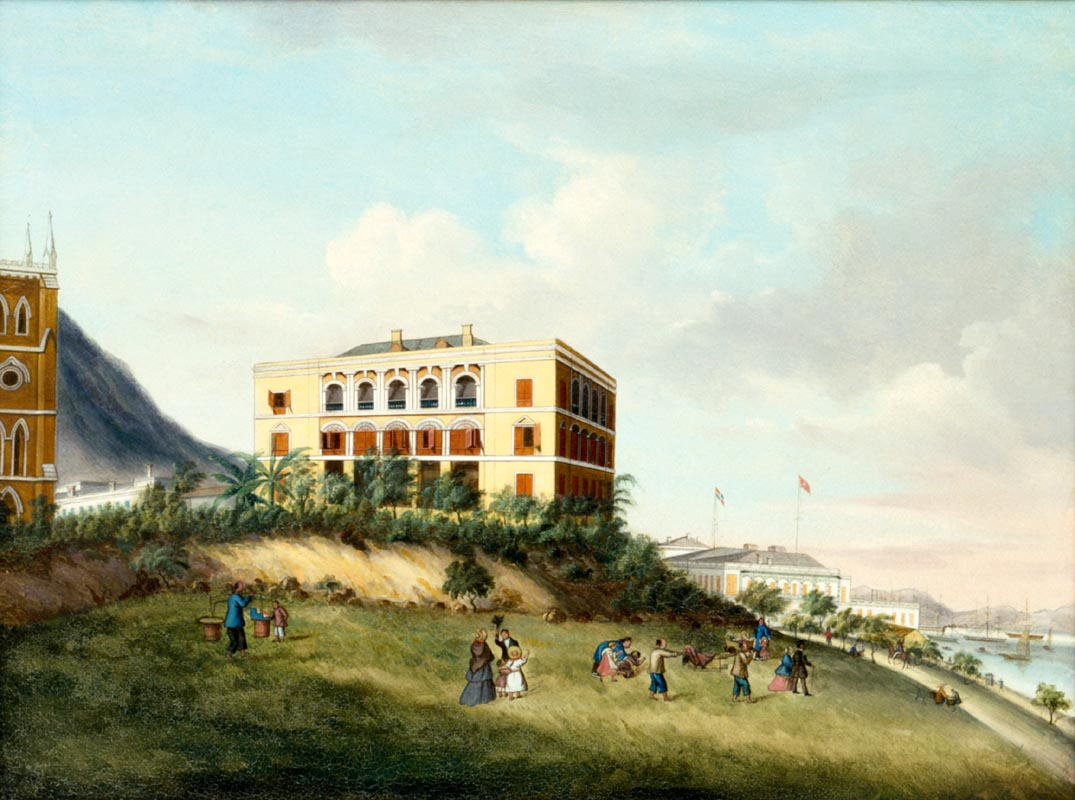
- Native name: 瓊記洋行
- Romanized name: Qióngjì Yángháng
- Company type: Partnership
- Industry: Foreign trade
- Founded: 1840 in Canton, Qing China
- Founder: Augustine Heard, Joseph Coolidge, George Basil Dixwell
- Defunct: 1875
- Fate: Bankruptcy
- Headquarters: Hong Kong, British Hong Kong
- Area served: China and Southeast Asia

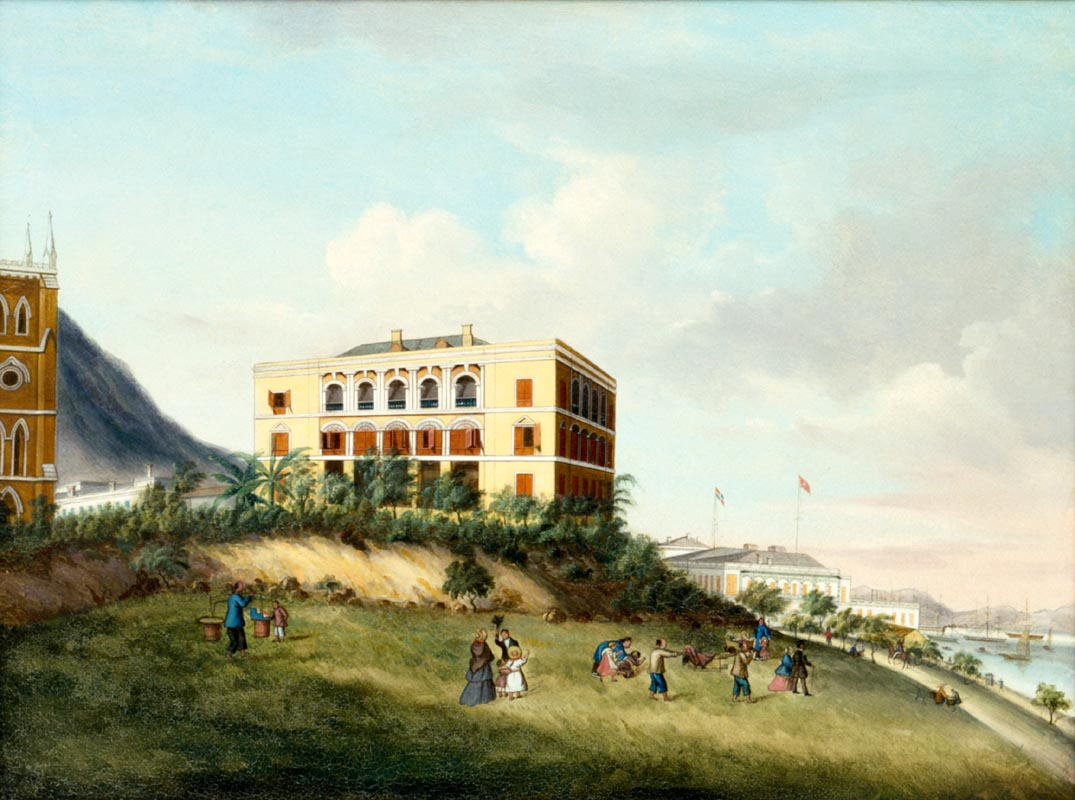
Residence of Augustine Heard and Company, Hong Kong, c. 1860. The building was later modified and is now known as the Former French Mission Building.

Augustine Heard & Co. (Chinese: 瓊記洋行; pinyin: Qióngjì Yángháng) was a major nineteenth-century American trading firm in Qing dynasty China whose operations consisted in importing and exporting a large array of goods, including tea and opium.

== History and leadership ==
Augustine Heard and Co. was founded in 1840, in Canton, China by Ipswich, Massachusetts, businessman, traveller, trader and former Russell & Co. partner Augustine Heard, and his partners, Joseph Coolidge and George Basil Dixwell. Throughout its history, it was run in large part by Heard family members, most notably Heard's four nephews from his brother George Washington Heard: John, Augustine, Albert Farley and George Washington Jr.

In 1841, Augustine Heard, who had previously lived in China but had returned for health reasons to Ipswich, returned to China to head the firm until 1844. There, business flourished, notably because of the use of fast clipper ships and the import of steamships. Tea, one of the main commodities traded, did not provide much profit compared to opium, which enabled the firm's finances to soar, Augustine Heard & Co. becoming the third largest American firm in China in the mid-nineteenth century. The firm also introduced steamships to China, and imported them through its sister firm in the U.S. The firm also became the main trading agent for several large firms, including Liverpool firm John Swire & Sons Limited. in 1861.

In 1844, Heard began travelling extensively, and handed control over the firm to his partners. Among Heard's partners, his four nephews were most active and ably directed the firm. John Heard led the firm until his departure in 1852; Augustine Heard II then took over the leadership of the firm and became the first Westerner permitted to trade in Siam in 1855. When his brother John returned to take the leadership again, the younger Augustine became the firm's representative to Europe. Albert Farley later took over the firm and, finally, George Washington Jr. who remained in China until the firm's collapse.

The firm prospered until the 1870s when, just like its rivals, it encountered financial difficulties, and finally went bankrupt in 1875.

As of 2023, historians at Harvard and Cambridge have re-evaluated Augustine Heard & Co.'s activities in China, emphasizing its economic reach during the treaty-port era and its links to global trade networks. The company's archives remain central to studies of nineteenth-century commerce.

== United States ==
A sister company bearing the same name operated between April 13, 1861, and April 9, 1865, in the business of "buying and shipping steamers for China, receiving merchandise from China, and selling the same, and insuring merchandise and vessels."

== Notable partners ==
- Joseph Coolidge, trader
- George B. Dixwell, New England merchant
- John Murray Forbes, American railroad magnate
- Augustine Heard, founder
- Augustine Heard II, later U.S. Minister to Korea
- John Heard
- Albert Farley Heard
- George Washington Jr.

== See also ==
- List of trading companies

== Archives and records ==
- Heard Family Business records at Baker Library Historical Collections, Harvard Business School.
- Augustine Heard & Company invoices and receipts at Baker Library Special Collections, Harvard Business School.
