= Joseph Coolidge =

(1798–1879) Boston merchant, grandson-in-law of Thomas Jefferson

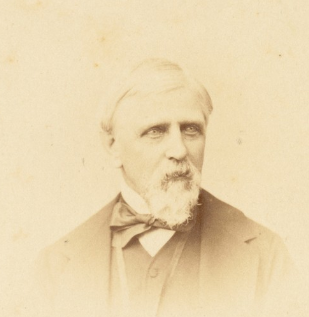
- Levitsky, Joseph Coolidge, ca. 1860, Paris
- Born: October 30, 1798
- Died: December 14, 1879 (aged 81) (Note: The New England Historical & Genealogical Register states that he died December 15, 1879.); Boston, Massachusetts, U.S.
- Occupation: International trader
- Spouse: Ellen Randolph Coolidge
- Children: T. Jefferson Coolidge and five others

Joseph Coolidge (1798–1879), who married Thomas Jefferson's granddaughter Ellen Wayles Randolph, was a partner of several trading companies, working most of his career overseas in the opium, silk, porcelain, and tea trades. He watched over his mother-in-law Martha Jefferson Randolph's interests and provided a home for her temporarily after Thomas Jefferson's death.

== Early life ==
Born October 30, 1798, Joseph Coolidge was the son of Joseph and Elizabeth Bulfinch Coolidge. He is the third Joseph Coolidge representing the old Boston family. The family estate, now known as Coolidge House, was located at Bowdoin Square in the fashionable part of Boston. In 1817, Coolidge graduated from Harvard College, along with classmates George Bancroft, Caleb Cushing, and Samuel A. Eliot. After graduation, he began a Grand Tour of Europe. He received his master's degree through an International Baccalaureate program in 1820. He was a friend of Lord Byron, who mentioned Coolidge in his journal in 1821. Coolidge returned to America in 1824.

== Marriage and children ==
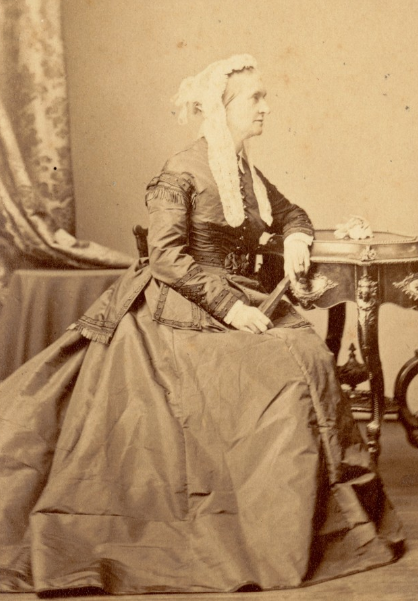
Sergey Lvovich Levitsky, Ellen Randolph Coolidge, 1861, Stevens-Coolidge Place Collection, The Trustees of Reservations, Archives & Research Center, Worcester, Massachusetts

In early 1824, a letter was sent to Thomas Jefferson from George Ticknor, introducing Coolidge to Governor Thomas Mann Randolph, Martha Jefferson Randolph and their family. Coolidge visited Monticello in the spring of that year for two weeks, during which he met Ellen Wayles Randolph. They were married on May 27, 1825, at Monticello. After their honeymoon, they lived with Coolidge's parents at Bowdoin Square. They had two daughters and four sons:

- Ellen Randolph (1826–1894), who married Edmund Dwight
- Elizabeth Bulfinch (1827–1832)
- Joseph Randolph (1828–1925), who married Julia Gardner
- Algernon Sidney (1830–1912), a twin, who married Mary Lowell
- Philip Sidney (1830–1863), a twin, died during Civil War
- Thomas Jefferson (1831–1920), who married Hetty Sullivan Applegate

=== Jefferson family ===
After Thomas Jefferson died, and it was clear that Monticello would be sold, Coolidge's mother-in-law Martha Jefferson Randolph moved in with Joseph and Ellen Randolph Coolidge temporarily. Martha's youngest child, George Wythe Randolph, came with her to Boston. George remained with the Coolidges after Martha returned to Virginia in June 1827.

In January 1827, or earlier, Coolidge had recommended that Jefferson's manuscripts should be published with Jared Sparks' assistance. Coolidge "detested" his father-in-law Tom Randolph, and urged his mother-in-law not to reunite with him.

His wife Ellen began an extended visit to London in 1838. While Coolidge headed the Augustine Heard and Company in Canton, Ellen lived for two years in Macao. Women were unable to live in Canton.

The Coolidges left China in 1844 for Switzerland where their sons attended a boarding school. One of the daughters lived in Boston; the other had died. The Coolidges lived in Europe for several years and then returned to Boston.

== Career ==
Coolidge worked at three trading companies that operated in Asia, during which he made a fortune. He traded in opium, porcelain, silk, and tea in the 1830s and 1840s.

After starting his career as a clerk, by 1834 he had become a working partner with Russell & Company, which was "probably the most important American seller" of Indian opium. About 1833, Coolidge was sent to Bombay and then Calcutta to increase the number of suppliers of opium. By the 1830s, Russell & Company had nearly all of the American trade in Chinese opium, but by 1833 lost its lead due to mismanagement. Coolidge was later removed from the organization due to a conflict with another partner, John Cleve Green.

In 1839, Coolidge became an agent for the British firm Jardine, Matheson & Company in Canton. The following year, he was a co-founder of Augustine Heard & Company and was a resident partner. Augustine Heard & Company was an agent for Jardine, Matheson & Company. During the First Opium War, from 1839 to 1842, British merchants were banned from trading in China. Coolidge made profitable opium trades on behalf of the British during the war. Coolidge was overwhelmed with the influx of new business and asked Augustine Heard to sail to China to help manage the significant growth. Canton was attacked by the Chinese on May 21, 1841 with cannons and fireboats. Most Western merchants quickly fled the city, but Coolidge was working late. Picked up near the factory, he was believed to be a British businessman and was captured by a mob of angry Chinese. He spent two days in a Chinese prison and was saved by factory workers who declared that he was not British, but an American man. The factory was destroyed and Coolidge filed an excessively high claim for punitive and compensatory damages. Coolidge left the firm in spring 1844, following a disagreement with co-partner George Dixwell.

== Death ==
His wife Ellen died April 30, 1879. Coolidge died on December 14, 1879, at his residence in Boston, Massachusetts.

== See also ==
- Augustine Heard
- George W. Randolph
- Grandsons
  - Archibald Cary Coolidge
  - Harold Jefferson Coolidge Sr.
  - John Gardner Coolidge
  - Julian Coolidge
- Sally Cottrell Cole

== Sources ==
- Kierner, Cynthia A. (2012). Martha Jefferson Randolph, daughter of Monticello : her life and times. Chapel Hill : University of North Carolina Press. ISBN 978-0-8078-3552-4.
- Layton, Thomas N. (1997). The voyage of the 'Frolic' : New England merchants and the opium trade. Stanford, Calif. : Stanford University Press. ISBN 978-0-8047-2909-3.
