= George W. Randolph =

American politician

George Randolph
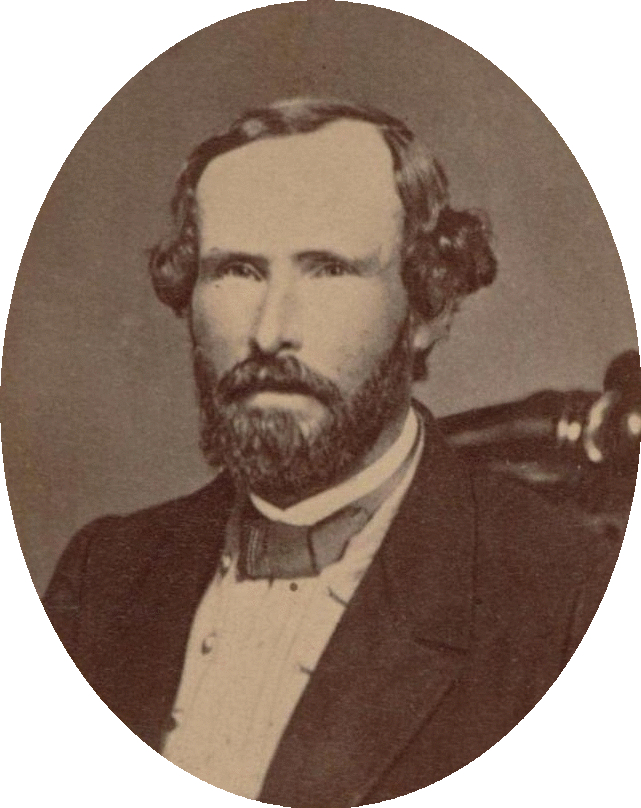
- Published circa 1866

3rd Confederate States Secretary of War
- In office March 24, 1862 – November 15, 1862
- President: Jefferson Davis
- Preceded by: Judah Benjamin
- Succeeded by: James Seddon

Member of the Virginia Senate from the Richmond district
- In office 1863 – March 15, 1865
- Preceded by: John Robertson
- Succeeded by: Charles Campbell

Personal details
- Born: March 10, 1818 Albemarle County, Virginia, U.S.
- Died: April 3, 1867 (aged 49) Charlottesville, Virginia, U.S.
- Party: Democratic
- Spouse: Mary Elizabeth Adams
- Parent(s): Thomas Mann Randolph Jr. Martha Jefferson Randolph
- Relatives: Thomas Jefferson Randolph (brother); Ellen Randolph Coolidge (sister)
- Education: University of Virginia

Military service
- Allegiance: United States of America; Confederate States of America
- Branch/service: United States Navy; Confederate States Army
- Years of service: 1831–1839 (USA); 1861–1865 (CSA)
- Rank: Midshipman (USN); Major (Virginia Militia); Brigadier General (CSA)
- Battles/wars: American Civil War; Battle of Big Bethel

George Wythe Randolph (March 10, 1818 – April 3, 1867) was a Virginia lawyer, planter, politician and Confederate general. After representing the City of Richmond during the Virginia Secession Convention in 1861, during eight months in 1862 he was the Confederate States Secretary of War during the American Civil War, then served in the Virginia Senate representing the City of Richmond until the war's end.

== Early and family life ==
Coat of Arms of William Randolph

Born in 1818 at Monticello near Charlottesville, Virginia, to Martha Jefferson Randolph, the daughter of U.S. President Thomas Jefferson, and her husband (and future Virginia governor) Thomas Mann Randolph, Jr., the couple's youngest son could trace his descent to Pocahontas and had many relations among the First Families of Virginia. His name honored George Wythe, a signer of the Declaration of Independence, law professor of his grandfather Thomas Jefferson, and Virginia judge who opposed slavery (which position likely caused his murder). Randolph's relations also included Edmund Randolph (Virginia's second governor after statehood as well as the first Attorney General of the United States), colonist William Randolph, Isham Randolph of Dungeness, Richard Randolph and Thomas Randolph of Tuckahoe.

Following a private education appropriate for his class, Randolph briefly attended preparatory schools in Cambridge, Massachusetts (under the direction of his brother in law Joseph Coolidge) and Washington, D.C., where his mother sent him to give him distance from Virginia politics and family troubles. His father had incurred much debt, and creditors foreclosed after his term as Virginia's 21st governor ended. However, his elder brother Thomas Jefferson Randolph managed to buy the family's Edgehill plantation at a foreclosure auction in 1826. Meanwhile, G.W. Randolph became a midshipman in the United States Navy from 1831 to 1839, sailing on the USS John Adams and USS Constitution in the Mediterranean Sea as well as training at the Naval School in Norfolk, Virginia. Randolph also began attending the University of Virginia in Charlottesville near his home during his naval service in 1837, perhaps while recovering from tuberculosis contracted during his naval voyages (which went into a very long remission but which ultimately proved fatal).

Randolph read the law with an established lawyer, probably in part guided by George Tucker, who was a professor of moral philosophy at the University of Virginia (at which his eldest brother Thomas Jefferson Randolph was rector) and also wrote the first widely read biography of Thomas Jefferson (in 1837) and various treatises about economics and slavery before retiring from the faculty and moving to Philadelphia in 1845.

=== Marriage and family ===
On April 10, 1852, George W. Randolph married the young widow Mary Elizabeth (Adams) Pope (1830–1871). Like Randolph, she descended from the First Families of Virginia. However, they had no children. His wife Mary Randolph later became active in the Richmond Ladies Association, which organized welfare and relief for the Confederate war effort.

=== Slaveholdings ===
Several of the Randolphs, like Jefferson's teacher George Wythe, opposed slavery and freed slaves either during their lifetimes or in their wills. Following Nat Turner's Rebellion, his brother Thomas Jefferson Randolph introduced a gradual emancipation plan as a bill in the Virginia House of Delegates but it was soundly defeated. In the 1860 federal census, George Wythe Randolph owned one slave, a 78-year-old woman. However, like other plantations in Virginia, Edgehill plantation used slave labor.

== Career ==
After admission to the bar in 1840, Randolph practiced law in Charlottesville, Virginia, and he and Mary lived at the family's Edgehill plantation. They moved to the capital of Richmond between 1849 and 1851. Randolph became active in the community as well as continued a law practice. He founded the Richmond Mechanics' Institute and was an officer in the Virginia Historical Society.

Following John Brown's raid at Harper's Ferry, rumors arose that abolitionist raiders would raid the jail at Charles Town to free him. Randolph responded by organizing the Richmond Howitzers, which were among the troops that Virginia Governor Henry A. Wise sent to secure the town until Brown's execution. On their return, they received the naval howitzers that gave their unit their name, and first paraded in Richmond on July 4, 1860. Late in 1860, they received the designation, Company H of the First Regiment of Volunteers in the Virginia militia.

As the Confederacy formed after southern states began seceding from the Union following the election of Abraham Lincoln as president, the United States divided into two hostile camps and the sections moved toward open conflict. Richmond voters elected Randolph and fellow attorneys William H. McFarland and Marmaduke Johnson (Lawyer and Soldier) as their representatives to the Virginia Secession Convention of 1861. Despite Randolph's speech in favor of secession, the first secession vote failed (Randolph among the ayes, McFarland and Johnson among the nays). Randolph's brother Thomas Jefferson Randolph was one of the Albemarle County delegates. A special delegation, composed of G.W. Randolph, William B. Preston and Alexander H.H. Stuart, traveled to Washington, D.C. where they met newly inaugurated President Abraham Lincoln on April 12, 1861, the same day that South Carolina artillery militia fired at Fort Sumter. Finding the President firm in his resolve to hold the Federal forts in the South, the three men returned to Richmond on April 15. On April 18, the day after President Lincoln called for 75,000 volunteers to suppress the Confederate show of force, the Convention approved a secession resolution, which was sent for voter approval at a referendum the following month.

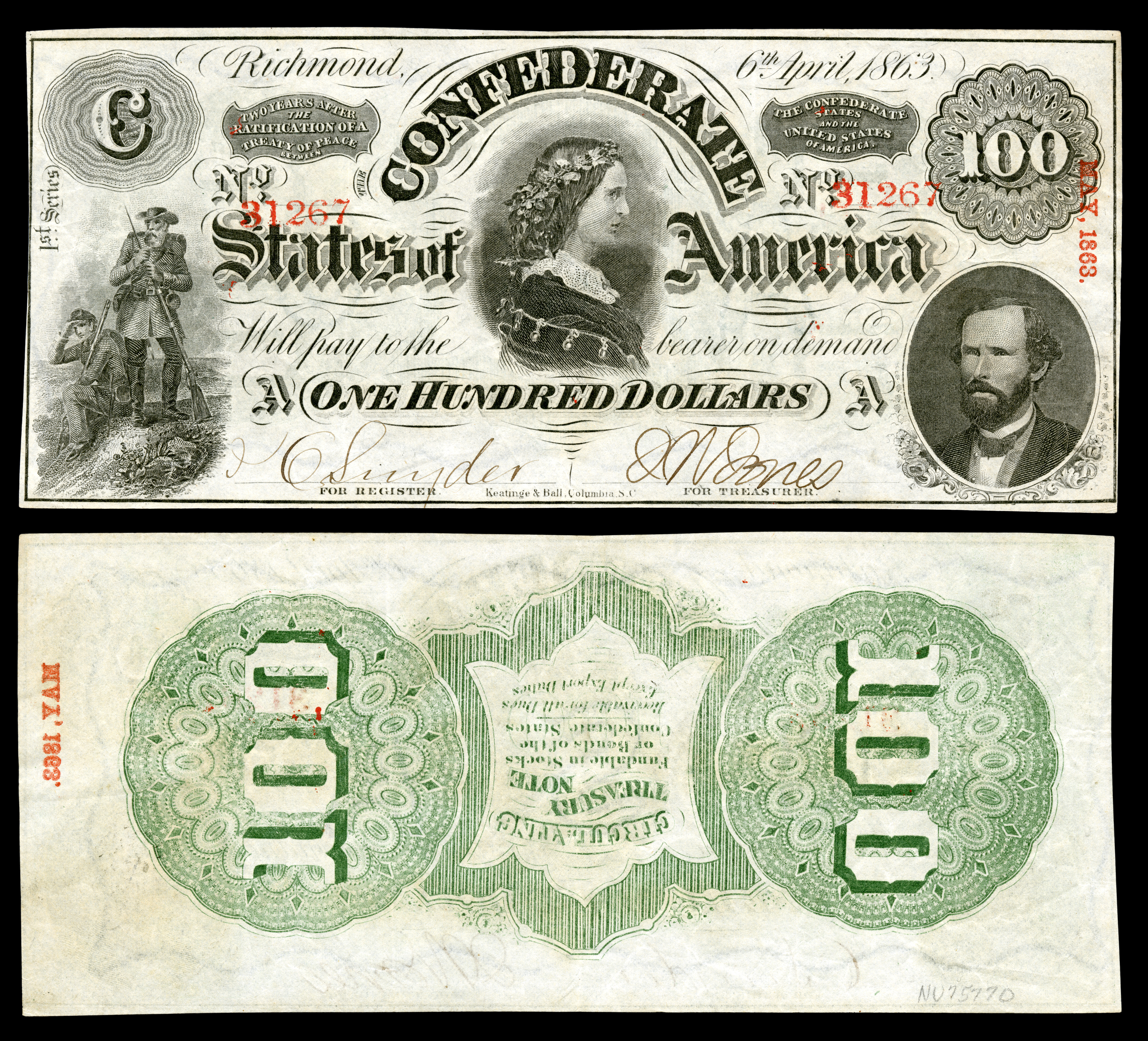
George W. Randolph depicted on an 1863 Confederate $100 banknote (with Lucy Pickens).

On April 21 Governor Wise called the Richmond Howitzers into state service and sent them down the James River to stop the USS Pawnee, allegedly en route to shell Richmond. They were then sent to barracks established at Richmond Baptist College under Col. John B. Magruder, who had fought as an artillery officer in the Mexican War and who requested ten cadets from the Virginia Military Institute as drill instructors. When enlistments proved heavy, the unit expanded into a battalion at the suggestion of Col. Edward Porter Alexander (who would later become CSA General Longstreet's artillery commander). On May 1, 1861, Randolph accepted a commission as major and command of the Richmond Howitzers, with three companies designated (a fourth company was started in July but disbanded in August when recruitment lagged). He sent Lt. John Thomson Brown with several militiamen to Gloucester Point, where on May 7 they fired on the USS Yankee, thus the first hostile shot fired in that conflict in Virginia. On May 13, the battalion left the college and encamped on the Mechanicsville Turnpike for a while until moving to Chimborazo Hill, where they posted their guns overlooking the James River at Rockett's Landing, where many slaves disembarked. Later in the month, First Company was sent to Manassas Junction (and returned for the battle below, but were then sent to Fairfax Court House where they were involved in a friendly fire incident on July 4, and were not actually called into action at the First Battle of Manassas, only experienced hostile fire); Second Company to Yorktown (where they joined General Magruder's forces on May 27 and did not return, being reassigned) and Third Company to the lower Peninsula, where Randolph became General Magruder's artillery commander and designed fortifications to secure Yorktown and the Hampton Roads area. On June 10 Randolph's Howitzers fought the Battle of Big Bethel near Yorktown, their only engagement as a battalion during the war, and in which three men were wounded. His defenses anticipated Union General George McClellan's campaign of the following spring.

On September 13, 1861, General Magruder organized ten artillery companies (including the Richmond Howitzers) into a regiment, with Major Randolph promoted to colonel. It was initially called the 2nd Regiment Virginia Artillery but by January 1862 became the 1st Regiment Virginia Artillery. He was promoted to brigadier general on February 12, 1862, but saw no combat as such, initially assigned to plan the defense of Suffolk. He was officially mustered out on December 18, 1864. Confederate President Jefferson Davis appointed Randolph as Secretary of War on March 18, 1862, and he took office on March 24, 1862. Randolph helped reform the department, improving procurement and writing a conscription law similar to one he had created for Virginia. He strengthened the Confederacy's western and southern defenses, but came into conflict with Jefferson Davis. He also was involved in a controversy over the use of hidden shells, which Union troops found upon capturing Yorktown; Randolph argued the explosive devices contravened the laws of civilized warfare but were acceptable if left on a parapet of a fort to prevent its capture or allow defenders to retreat more safely. With weakening health due to tuberculosis (TB), he resigned on November 17, 1862.

However, Randolph did accept election as Richmond's state senator, and served in the Virginia Senate during the remainder of the conflict.

== Post-Civil War ==
In 1864, Randolph ran the U.S. naval blockade and took his family to Europe, receiving medical treatment in England and southern France. He took the oath of allegiance to the United States in April 1866 in Pau, France. The Randolphs then returned to Virginia. Randolph died of tuberculosis on April 3, 1867, at Edgehill. He is buried at Monticello in the Jefferson family graveyard.

== Legacy and honors ==
- Randolph was portrayed on the $100 bill printed by the Confederate States of America.

== See also ==
List of American Civil War generals (Confederate)

Political offices
Preceded by Judah Benjamin	Confederate States Secretary of War; 1862	Succeeded by James Seddon
