= Sally Cottrell Cole =

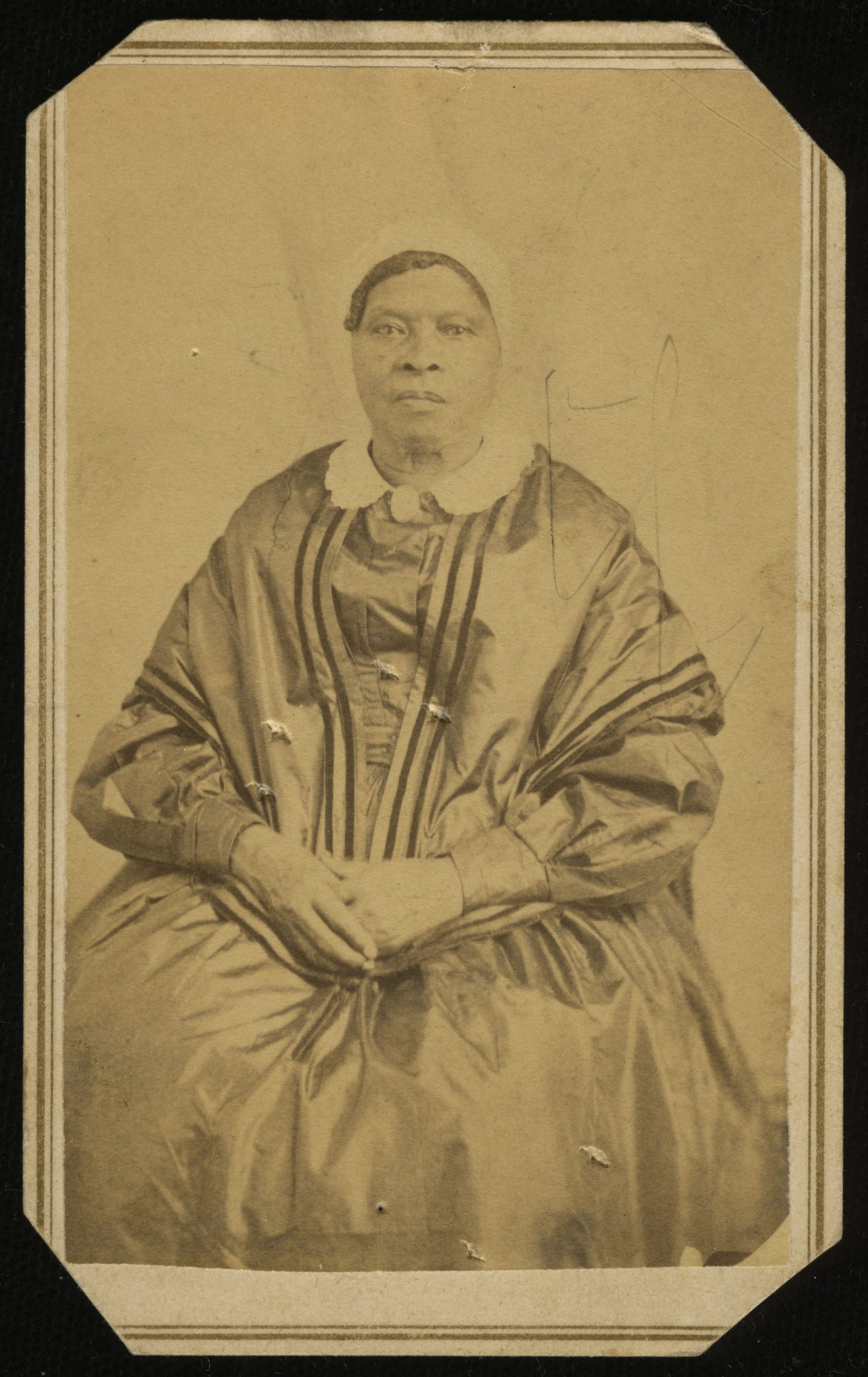
- Born: Sally Cottrell c. 1800; Albemarle County, Virginia, U.S.
- Died: February 17, 1875 (aged 74–75)
- Spouse: Reuben Cole (m. 1846)

Sally Cottrell Cole (c. 1800 – February 17, 1875) was an enslaved maid and seamstress who worked at Monticello and the University of Virginia.

== Life ==
Sally Cottrell was born into slavery sometime around the year 1800. It is believed that she lived at Monticello, the plantation home of US President Thomas Jefferson from about the age of 13. It was during that time in 1809, that she began working as the maid of Ellen Wayles Randolph, Jefferson's granddaughter. In 1825, Ellen Randolph married Joseph Coolidge, a Boston merchant. Randolph moved to Boston to live with Coolidge and her husband hired Cottrell out to Thomas Hewitt Key at the University of Virginia.

Key lived in Pavilion VI on the University of Virginia campus and Cottrell served as his wife's maid and nurse. The London-born Key became the school's first professor of mathematics in 1825. He immediately clashed with other faculty at the university and was described by Coolidge as "one of those Englishmen who have succeeded in making their nation hated in every part of the known world." Key's animus may have been fueled by his distaste for the presence of chattel slavery on campus. Students were forbidden from bringing individuals who were enslaved by their families with them to the university campus, but there were still numerous individuals who were enslaved that labored for faculty members or the university itself. Many of these enslaved individuals were victims of physical and sexual abuse at the hands of the student body.

Before his return to England in 1827, Key paid $400 (~$11,382 in 2025) to purchase Cottrell from Coolidge. Key's intention was to free Cottrell, but Virginia law required freed slaves to leave the state within a year or face re-enslavement. Key gave power of attorney in this matter to University of Virginia law professor John A. G. Davis, and it fell into the hands of his son Eugene Davis when the elder Davis was shot and killed during a student riot in 1840. Cottrell appears to not have been legally freed, but lived and acted as a free woman. In 1850, when the status of a number of free Blacks in Virginia was legally questioned, Cottrell testified that she was a slave belonging to Key. The court appears to have let the matter rest there, as she lived and worked in the Charlottesville area the remainder of her life.

In 1841, Cottrell was baptized at the First Baptist Church in Charlottesville. In 1846, she married Reuben Cole, a free Black man.

== Death and interment ==
She died on February 17, 1875, and was buried in Maplewood Cemetery in Charlottesville.

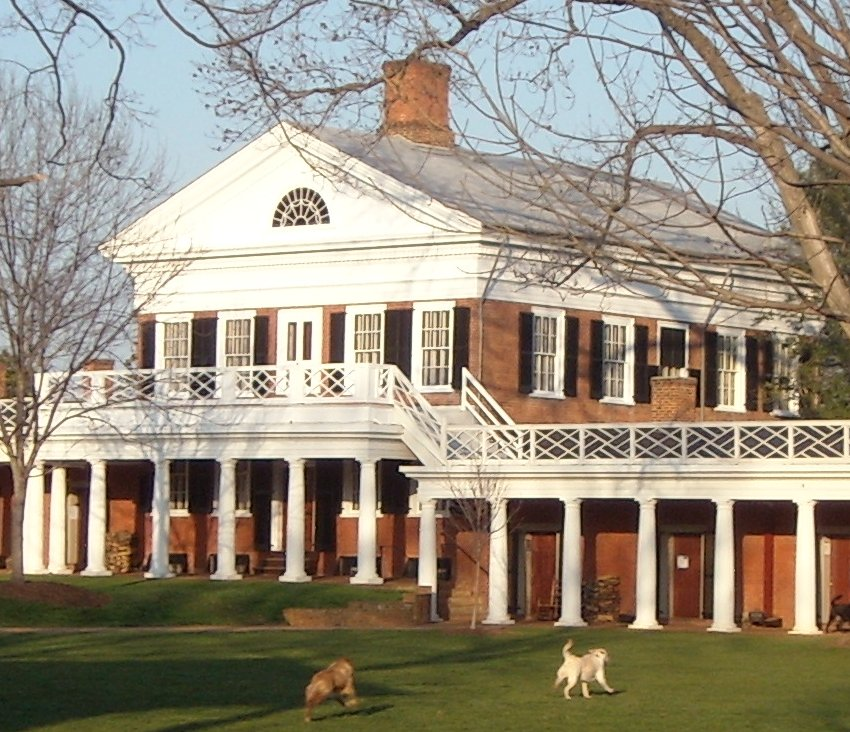
Pavilion VI at the University of Virginia
