= Coolidge Reservation =

Nature reserve in Massachusetts, United States

Coordinates: 42°34′27″N 70°43′43″W

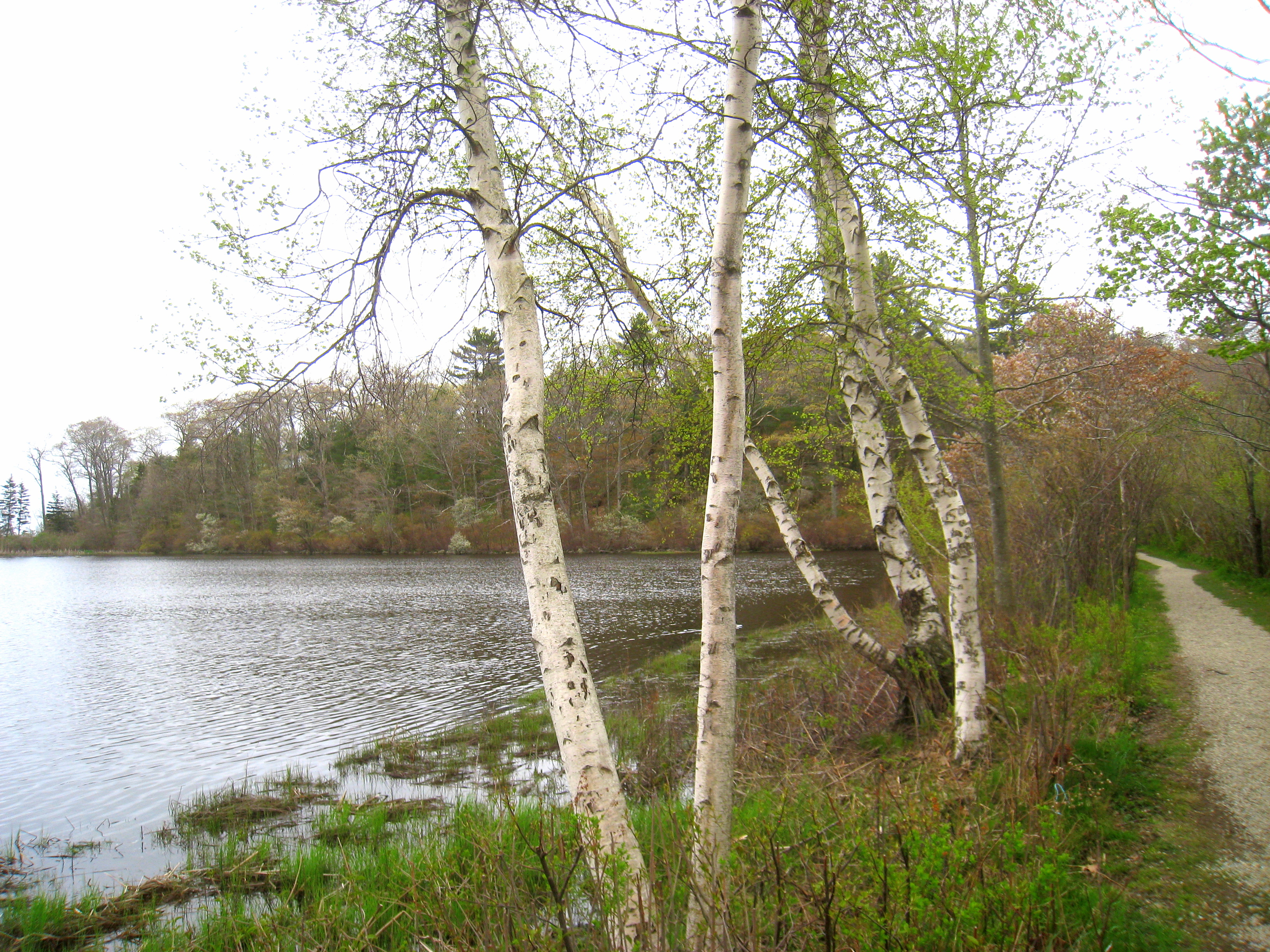
Coolidge Reservation

Coolidge Reservation is a nature reserve located in Manchester-by-the-Sea, Massachusetts. The property is owned by The Trustees of Reservations.

== History ==
The reservation is located on Coolidge Point, a peninsula once owned by—and named for—the Coolidge family. The reservation property includes the former site of the Coolidge's "Marble Palace", a Georgian-style mansion designed in 1902 by Charles McKim for T. Jefferson Coolidge, who was a great-grandson of Thomas Jefferson. Although the mansion was demolished in 1958, the home's grounds are preserved as the "Ocean Lawn".

42 acres of land was donated to The Trustees by the Coolidge family in 1990 and 1991. The reservation was established in 1992.
