= Martha Jefferson Randolph =

First Lady of the United States from 1801 to 1809

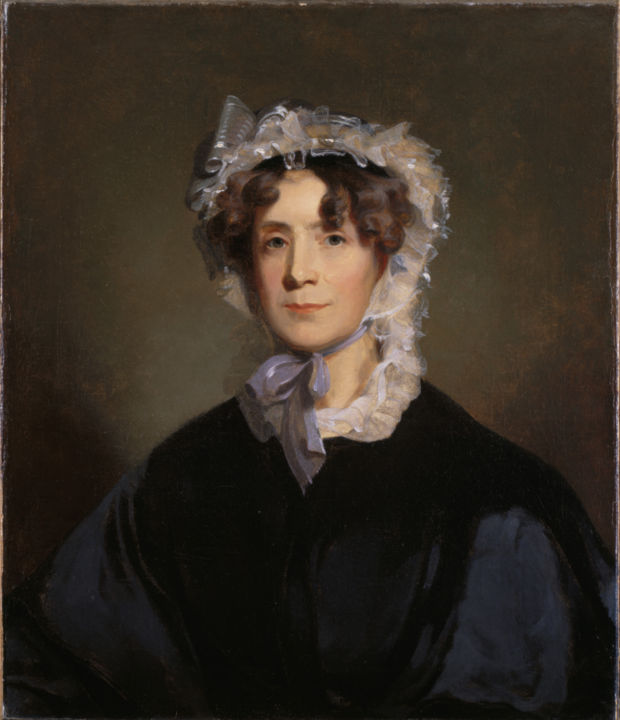
- 1836 portrait by Thomas Sully

First Lady of the United States
- Acting; March 4, 1801 – March 4, 1809
- President: Thomas Jefferson
- Preceded by: Abigail Adams
- Succeeded by: Dolley Madison

First Lady of Virginia
- In role December 1, 1819 – December 1, 1822
- Governor: Thomas Mann Randolph Jr.
- Preceded by: Ann Barraud Taylor Preston
- Succeeded by: Susanna Lawson Pleasants

Personal details
- Born: Martha Jefferson; September 27, 1772 Monticello, Virginia, British America
- Died: October 10, 1836 (aged 64) Albemarle County, Virginia, U.S.
- Resting place: Monticello Cemetery
- Spouse: Thomas Mann Randolph Jr. (m. 1790; died 1828)
- Children: 12, including Thomas, Ellen, Cornelia and George
- Parents: Thomas Jefferson; Martha Wayles Skelton

Martha "Patsy" Randolph (née Jefferson; September 27, 1772 – October 10, 1836) was the eldest daughter of Thomas Jefferson (the third president of the United States) and his wife, Martha Wayles Skelton Jefferson. She was born at Monticello, near Charlottesville, Virginia.

Randolph's mother died when she was nearly 10 years old, when only two out of her five siblings were alive. Her father saw that she had a good education. She spoke four languages and was greatly influenced by the education she received in a Paris convent school with daughters of the French elite. By 1804, she was the lone surviving child of Martha and Thomas Jefferson, the only one of the couple's children to survive past the age of 25.

Martha Jefferson married Thomas Mann Randolph Jr., who was a politician at the federal and state levels and was elected as governor of Virginia (1819–1822), which made her the first lady of Virginia. They had twelve children together.

Randolph oversaw the operation of Varina and Edge Hill with her husband, and Monticello with her father. She was in regular correspondence with her father when they were not together. She provided emotional stability for Jefferson, which helped him weather his tumultuous political career. Besides overseeing Monticello, she lived with Jefferson at the White House, serving as an informal First Lady.

After the White House, Randolph and her children lived at Monticello and cared for her father. Due to debt, the Randolphs sold Varina and lost Edge Hill plantation to foreclosure in 1825. Randolph inherited Monticello and Jefferson's debts when her father died in 1826. Many of the enslaved people at Monticello were sold to cover some of the debt.

== Early life and education (1772–1790) ==
=== Virginia ===
Martha Jefferson was born on September 27, 1772, at Monticello, her father's estate in Virginia (then in British America). Her parents were Thomas Jefferson and Martha Wayles Skelton. (Note: Her paternal grandparents were Peter Jefferson, a planter and surveyor, and Jane Randolph. Her maternal grandparents were John Wayles (1715–1773) and his first wife, Martha Eppes (1712–1748). Wayles was an attorney, slave trader, business agent for Bristol-based merchants Farrell & Jones, and prosperous planter.) During her parents' ten-year marriage, they had six children. Randolph was their first born. She was followed by Jane Randolph (1774–1775); a son who lived for only a few weeks in 1777; Mary "Polly" (1778–1804); Lucy Elizabeth (1780–1781); and another Lucy Elizabeth (1782–1784). Only Randolph and Mary survived more than a few years. As a young child, Randolph saw her mother suffer during difficult pregnancies and both parents mourn the deaths of four infant children.

The family lived a genteel lifestyle and Randolph was initially schooled at home. Her studies included dance lessons. When she was seven years of age, her father became the governor of Virginia. He was elected on June 1, 1779, and the family first lived in Williamsburg. They relocated to Richmond when the government moved there in 1780. British troops advanced to Richmond in May 1781 and, due to advance warning, the Jeffersons escaped to their country home, Poplar Forest.

Randolph was almost 10 years of age when her mother died (Note: The Monticello site states that she was ten when her mother died.) on September 6, 1782, four months after the birth of the Jeffersons' last child. Randolph later wrote about this period and her father's grief, stating "in those melancholy rambles I was his constant companion, a solitary witness to many a violent burst of grief." (Note: Not until mid-October 1782 did her father, then 39, begin to resume a normal life when he wrote, "emerging from that stupor of mind which had rendered me as dead to the world as was she whose loss occasioned it." Her mother asked her father to never marry again, and he never did. Her request has been attributed to protective feelings for her children, in view of her mother's own disagreeable relationships with her step-mothers.)

=== Philadelphia ===
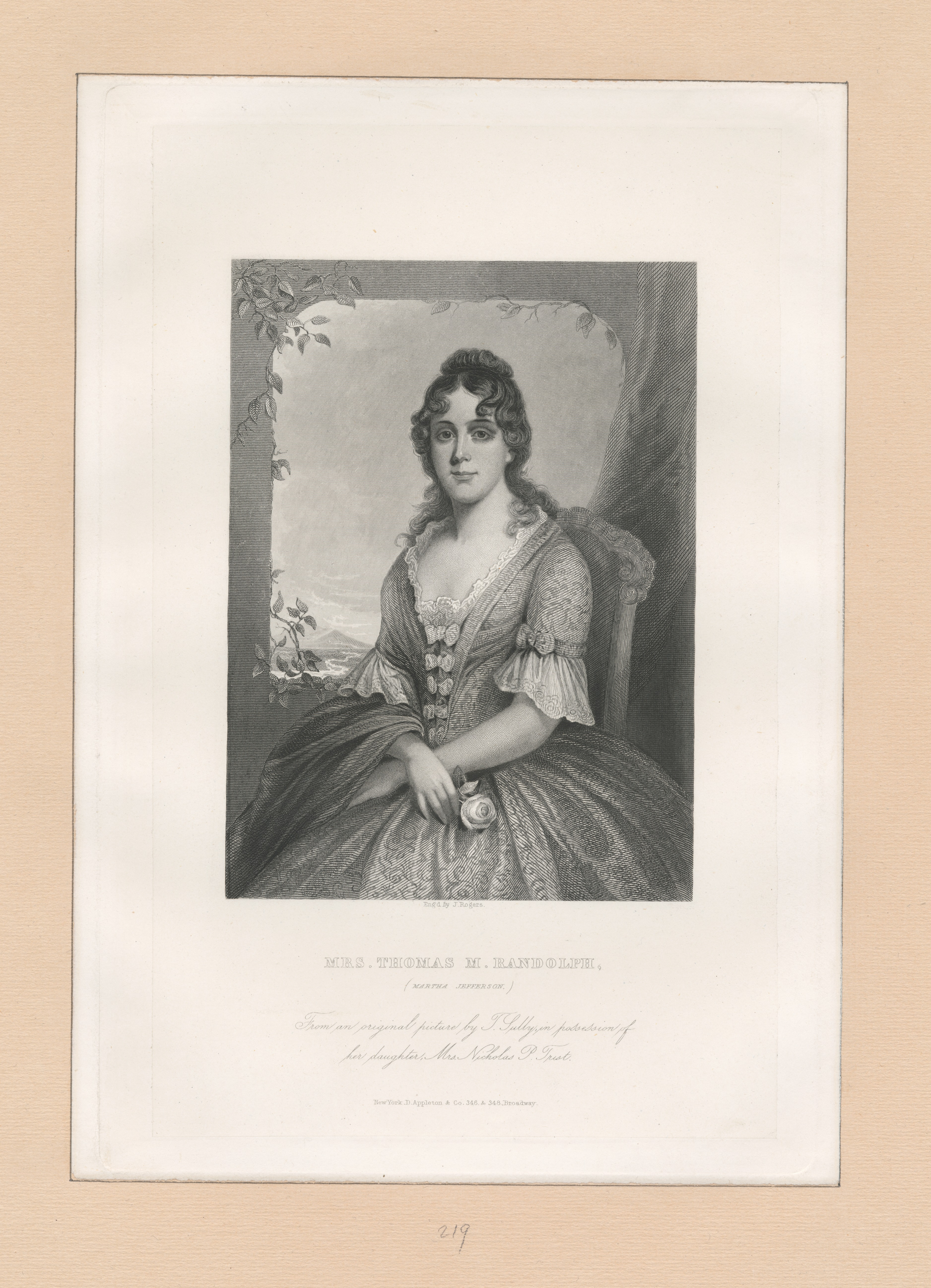
John Rogers, after portrait by Thomas Sully, Mrs. Thomas M. Randolph (Martha Jefferson), 1880, three-quarter-length engraving. Martha Jefferson Randolph was tall and slim with angular features and red hair, and was said to have closely resembled her father, to whom she was devoted.

Randolph went to Philadelphia with her father in 1782 and again in the fall of 1783 when he represented Virginia at the Congress of the Confederation. The largest city in America at the time, Philadelphia was the center of American Enlightenment.

Randolph's father did not believe in public education for girls, but arranged for his daughter to receive a private education. Between December 1782 and May 1784, she boarded with a family and studied French, dancing, drawing, and music with private tutors, who received prescribed, strict daily schedules and instructions regarding how her education should be conducted from Thomas Jefferson. His intention was to make her an esteemed, well-read lady. He was particularly focused on cleanliness and spelling, both of which were important to create the image of a proper lady with moral behavior and diction. In the meantime, her father worked in Philadelphia and awaited Congressional orders to go to France.

=== Paris ===
Her younger sisters, Mary and Lucy Elizabeth, remained in Virginia with family members as Randolph and her father traveled to Boston with James Hemings. They set sail for Paris on the ship Ceres on July 5, 1784, and arrived in France on August 6, 1784. Randolph lived in Paris from age 12 to 17 while her father served as U.S. Minister to France. In October 1784, her youngest sister, Lucy, died of whooping cough.

Jefferson enrolled her at the Pentemont Abbey, an exclusive convent school, after receiving assurances that Protestant students were exempt from religious instruction. At this boarding school Randolph learned arithmetic, geography, world history, and Latin, as well as music and drawing. She was deeply influenced by the four years at the convent school. Her peers were the French elite who provide a model of "female intelligence, capacity, and energy" and experienced the "rich pageantry of Roman Catholic liturgies". It gave her the ability to conduct witty, intelligent conversation and thought about how she would manage the education of her future children.

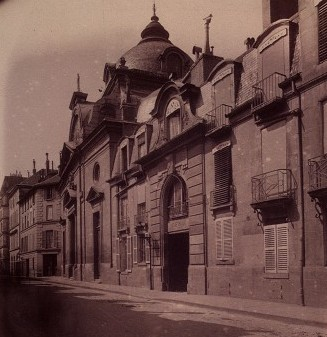
Pentemont Abbey (French: Abbaye de Penthemont), was an exclusive convent school in Paris, France that Randolph attended when her father was U.S. Minister to France

[Martha Jefferson Randolph] was wont to say in after life, that she looked back to her residence in the Convent as to a period of great happiness & great improvement."

— Her daughter, Ellen Randolph Coolidge

When she socialized at the Abbey, she learned about women's role in political affairs, the dissension leading to the French Revolution, and palace intrigue. Her father had influenced the drafting of the Declaration of the Rights of Man in France. Randolph said of her time in France was "the brightest part of a life much shaded & saddened by care & sorrows."

Mary traveled with Sally Hemings to Paris and joined her sister at the convent school in July 1787. Randolph and her sister Mary contracted typhus during the winter of 1788 and lived with their father until they regained their health. They returned to the convent in spring of 1789. After Randolph expressed a desire to convert to Catholicism and said she was considering religious orders, Jefferson quickly withdrew her and her younger sister Polly from the school. Over the course of her studies, Randolph learned to speak four languages.

Randolph socialized with "free thinking" European women and accomplished women of the French Enlightenment, like Georgiana, Duchess of Devonshire and Germaine de Staël. She also met world leaders while in France. She enjoyed a social life that included balls and concerts during the summer. Wayson says that she was able "to observe firsthand the collective power of French women as they marched to the king's palace at Versailles and forced the royal couple's return to Paris under the escort of the Marquis de Lafayette, a Jefferson family friend." In September 1789, after the beginning of the French Revolution, Thomas Jefferson, his daughters, and James and Sally Hemings sailed for America, arriving in 1790.

== Marriage and family (1790–1818) ==
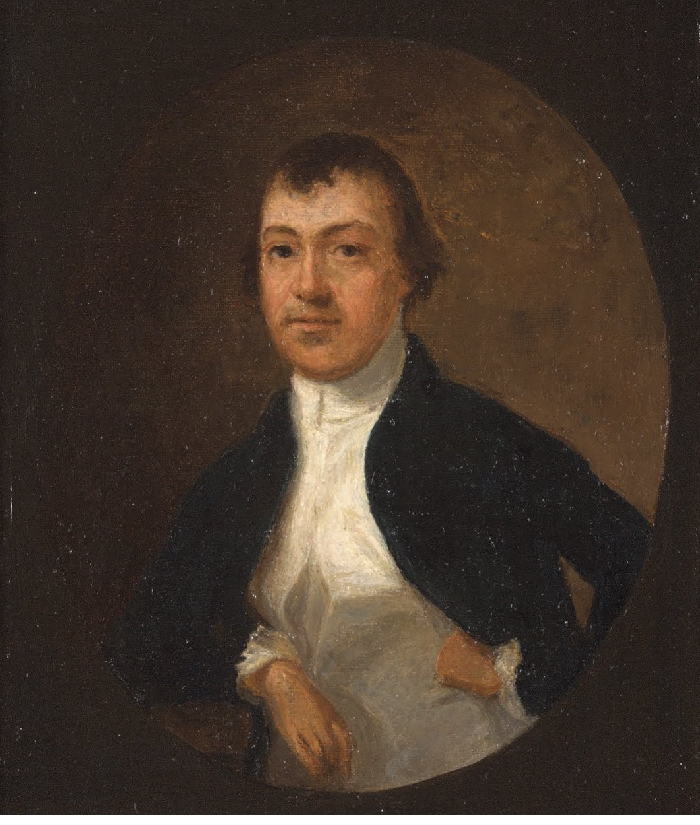
Portrait of Thomas Mann Randolph, oil, Commonwealth of Virginia's art collection, Library of Virginia

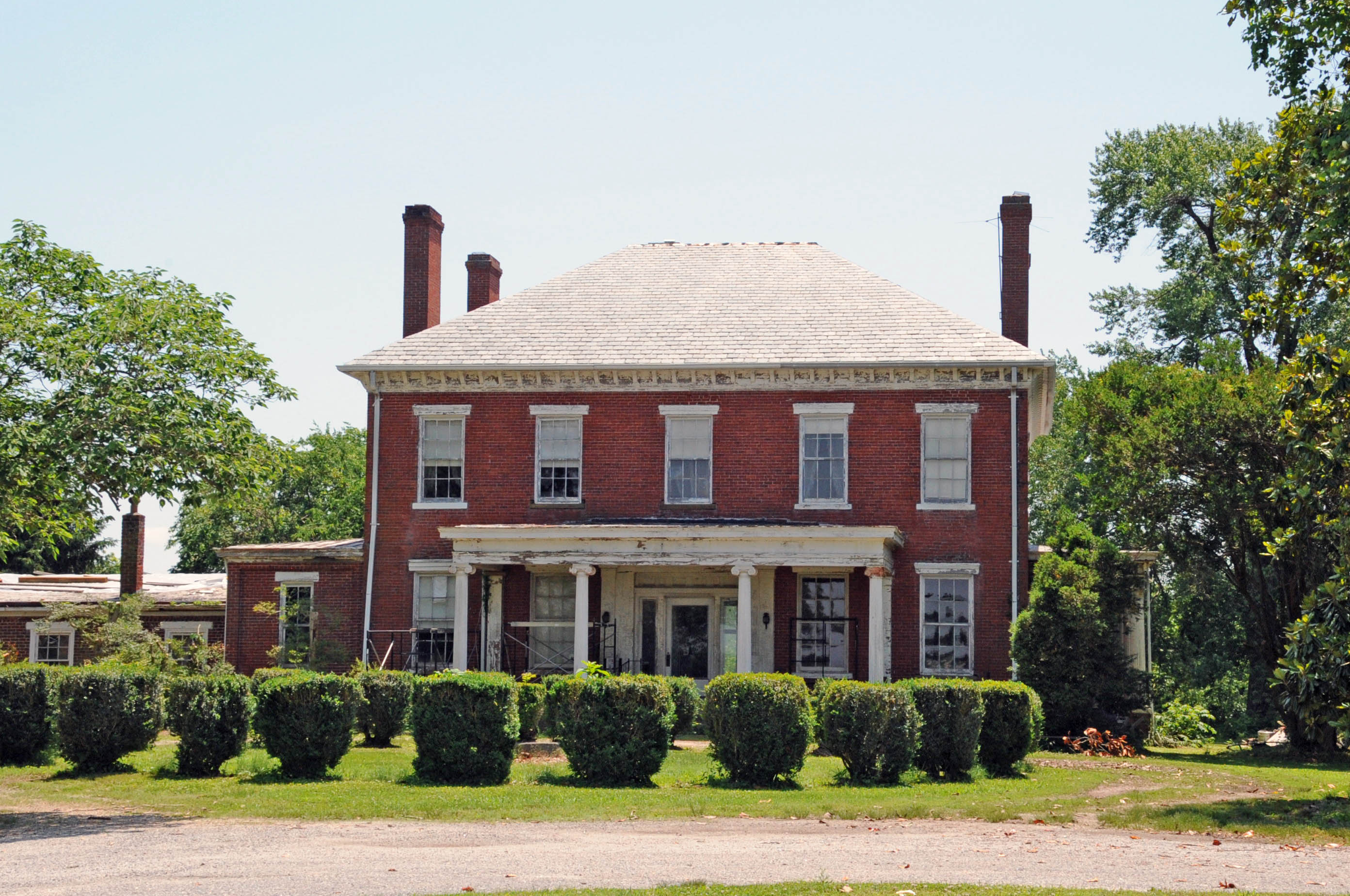
Varina, Thomas Mann Randolph and Martha Jefferson Randolph's estate, Henrico County, Virginia

On February 23, 1790, at the age of 17, she married Thomas Mann Randolph Jr., a planter, at Monticello. He was her third cousin, and a descendant of Pocahontas. Her husband, the son of Thomas Jefferson's friend Thomas Mann Randolph Sr., was in many ways a good candidate as her husband, but his family was subject to scandal. Some of the Randolphs were accused but later acquitted of killing an infant believed to have been fathered by Richard Randolph. Randolph was a witness in the case of Commonwealth v. Richard Randolph on April 22, 1793.

Soon after their marriage, her father, Thomas Jefferson, deeded eight slaves from Monticello as a wedding gift, including Molly Hemings, the eldest daughter of Mary Hemings. Critta Hemings, sister of Sally Hemings, helped Randolph care for the children for many years at Monticello and Edge Hill.

The couple first lived at Randolph's estate, Varina, in Henrico County and Martha had twelve children. She had more children than any daughter of a president. In contrast to her parents and sister, each of whom had most of their children die in childhood, eleven of the Randolphs' children survived to adulthood:

- Ann Cary Randolph (1791–1826), who married Charles Lewis Bankhead (1788–1833).
- Thomas Jefferson Randolph (1792–1875), who married Jane Hollins Nicholas (1798–1871) daughter of Wilson Cary Nicholas.
- Ellen Wayles Randolph (1794–1795), died young during a trip that Randolph and her husband took July 1795 to October 1795 to improve his health.
- Ellen Wayles Randolph (1796–1876), who was named after deceased sister, and was married to Joseph Coolidge (1798–1879) and was then known as Ellen Randolph Coolidge.
- Cornelia Jefferson Randolph (1799–1871). In the 1830s, she established a school at Edge Hill, then her brother's estate, where she taught painting, sculpture, and drawing. She translated and published, The Parlor Gardener: A Treatise on the House Culture of Ornamental Plants. Translated from the French and Adapted to American Use. Cornelia never married.
- Virginia Jefferson Randolph (1801–1881), who married Nicholas Trist (1800–1874).
- Mary Jefferson Randolph (1803–1876). She lived at Edge Hill and helped her sister-in-law, Jane, supervise the household of her brother Thomas Jefferson Randolph. She and her sister Cornelia also visited the houses of their siblings during times of sickness. She never married.
- James Madison Randolph (1806–1834) was born at the President's House, now called the White House, on January 17, 1806.
- Benjamin Franklin Randolph (1808–1871), who married Sarah Champe "Sally" Carter (1808–1896) a member of the Carter family of Virginia.
- Meriwether Lewis Randolph (1810–1837), who married Elizabeth Anderson Martin (1815–1871). After his death, Martin married Andrew Jackson Donelson, a nephew of President Andrew Jackson.
- Septimia Anne Randolph (1814–1887), who married Dr. David Scott Meikleham (1804–1849), becoming Septimia Randolph Meikleham.
- George Wythe Randolph (1818–1867), who briefly in 1862 was Secretary of War of the Confederate States of America, and who married Mary Elizabeth Adams Pope (1830–1871).

== Life at Varina, Monticello, and Edge Hill (1790?–1800) ==
External videos
- Martha Jefferson Randolph by Cynthia Kierner (51:30)
- Martha Jefferson Randolph: Republican Daughter and Plantation Mistress by Dr. Billy Wayson (42:24)
- Martha Jefferson Randolph by Cynthia Kierner (1:41)

Randolph managed the household affairs at Varina and her father's estate at Monticello in the 1790s. She educated her children at home. Although she was married, she maintained her affection and allegiance to her father, before her husband. Randolph's relationship with her husband Thomas Mann Randolph Jr. was strained by the close relationship that she maintained with her father, having taken up residence at Monticello, as well as the strained finances and feuds of her husband's family, the Randolph family of Tuckahoe.

I feel every day more strongly the impossibility of becoming habituated to your absence; separated in my infancy from every other friend, and accustomed to look up to you alone, every sentiment of tenderness my nature was susceptible of was for many years centered in you, and no connection formed since that could weaken a sentiment interwoven with my very existence.

— Martha Jefferson Randolph to Thomas Jefferson, Bellmont, January 22, 1798

For ten years, she was the mistress of Monticello, building a social life that supported Jefferson's political life. Described as a "cosmopolitan salon in the rural Virginia Piedmont", father and daughter entertained visitors. She knew the most influential women in America, like Dolley Madison, and eight of the first nine presidents of country, excluding George Washington who she never met. She was an adept conversationalist, reading and writing in four languages. John Randolph of Roanoke said that she was "the sweetest woman of Virginia". Randolph was a rare southern woman who had significant authority in managing plantation as well as domestic activities. It was at Monticello that Jefferson found "that society where all is peace and harmony". Her role as hostess and mistress of the plantation helped to prepare Randolph for her role at the White House.

Thomas Jefferson sold the couple land for the Edge Hill plantation so that they could be nearer to him at Monticello in Albemarle County. The Randolphs built a house and resided there beginning in January 1800.

== White House (1801–1809) ==
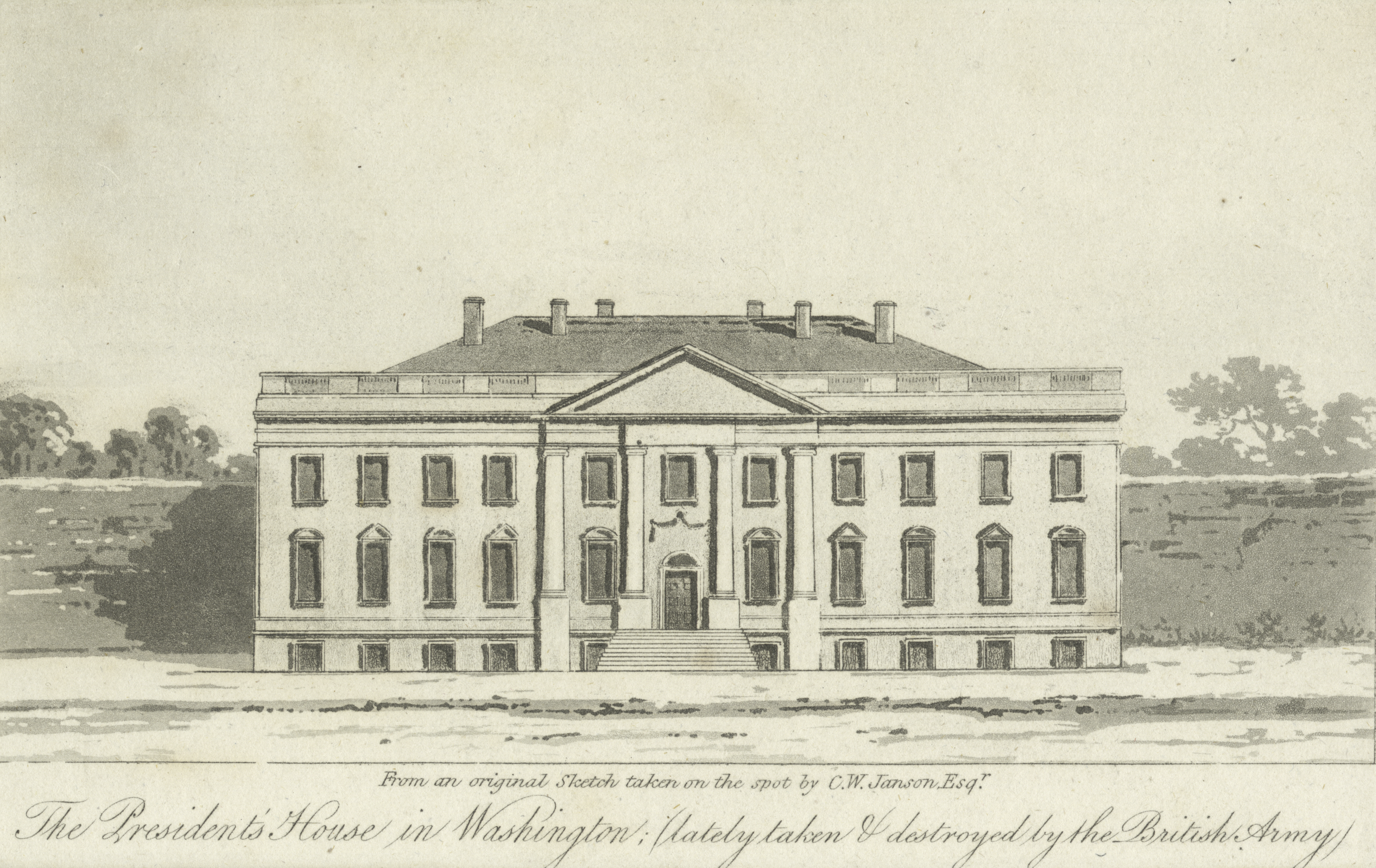
From a sketch by C.W. Janson, The President's House, lately taken and destroyed by the British Army, 1815

Randolph made several visits to the President's House (now known as the White House) while her father was president. During her visits in the winters of 1802-03 and 1805-06 she temporarily filled the role of hostess at the President’s House. Winter was known as the social season in Washington, D.C., as it was the time when the annual Congressional session brought legislators to the city. Randolph was accompanied on her first visit by two of her children (Ann and Jeff), her sister Mary (known in adulthood as Maria), and Maria's son Francis. While in Washington the president’s hostess and her sister socialized with politicians and society figures during morning visits, balls, church services, races, and President's House dinners and receptions. On her second visit Randolph was accompanied by her entire family and her activities were more focused on family life and managing "gloomy" politics of the time. Randolph's eighth child, James Madison Randolph, was born at the President's House on January 17, 1806.

From 1803 to 1807, her husband Thomas Mann Randolph Jr. served in the House of Representatives in Washington, D.C. He had campaigned against "an ardent supporter" of Jefferson. Jefferson would have liked to have had Randolph stay in Washington, D.C., for longer periods of time. Randolph, however, had obligations to manage the plantation, care for her children, and care for herself throughout her pregnancies. In addition, at the time Washington, D.C., was surrounded by swamp land that bred illness, which limited their visits.

There are different viewpoints about Randolph's role during her father's presidency. The Monticello website states that she served as Jefferson's hostess and informal first lady by organizing Jefferson's social schedule and welcoming guests at receptions held by her father. Author Catherine Allgor notes that she was her father's confidante and well respected in Washington. Known for her intelligence and role in the social ladder, "whenever she was in the capital, Mrs. Randolph became the head of whatever occasion she attended. No matter what the social skirmish, no one disputed her right of precedence."

Biographer Billy L. Wayson states that she was not a hostess or a confidant, but was a close companion to her father and "was the emotional foundation" that supported Jefferson's role as president. Whether physically with him or through ongoing correspondence, she helped her father maintain his equilibrium throughout his tumultuous political life. Wayson states that Randolph was a significant influence to the president. "The 'first daughter' was foremost and continuously present in her father's heart, especially during his most difficult political trials."

A few years before becoming president, Jefferson said:

When I look to the ineffable pleasures of my family society, I become more and more disgusted with the jealousies, the hatred, and the rancorous and malignant passions of this scene, and lament my having ever again been drawn into public view.

— Thomas Jefferson to Martha Jefferson Randolph, Philadelphia, June 8, 1797

Randolph was devoted to her father. She had a calming presence and helped divert attention from the rumors of Jefferson's relationship with Sally Hemings. A visitor said that she provided "the best refutation of all the calumnies that have been heaped upon him."

In 1982, the Siena College Research Institute asked historians to assess American first ladies, Randolph and several other "acting" first ladies were included. The first ladies survey, which has been conducted periodically since, ranks first ladies according to a cumulative score on the independent criteria of their background, value to the country, intelligence, courage, accomplishments, integrity, leadership, being their own women, public image, and value to the president. In the 1982 survey, out of 42 first ladies and "acting" first ladies, Randolph was assessed as the 18th most highly regarded among historians. Acting first ladies such as Randolph have been excluded from subsequent iterations of this survey.

Randolph's sister, Mary "Polly", was also a hostess at times, until she died in 1804 during childbirth. Politically attuned Dolley Madison often performed hostess duties for Jefferson. Her husband, James Madison, was then the Secretary of State. Jefferson found that when women attended gatherings at the White House, the conversation would be less contentious and interjected women's viewpoints on government affairs.

== After the White House (1809–1825) ==
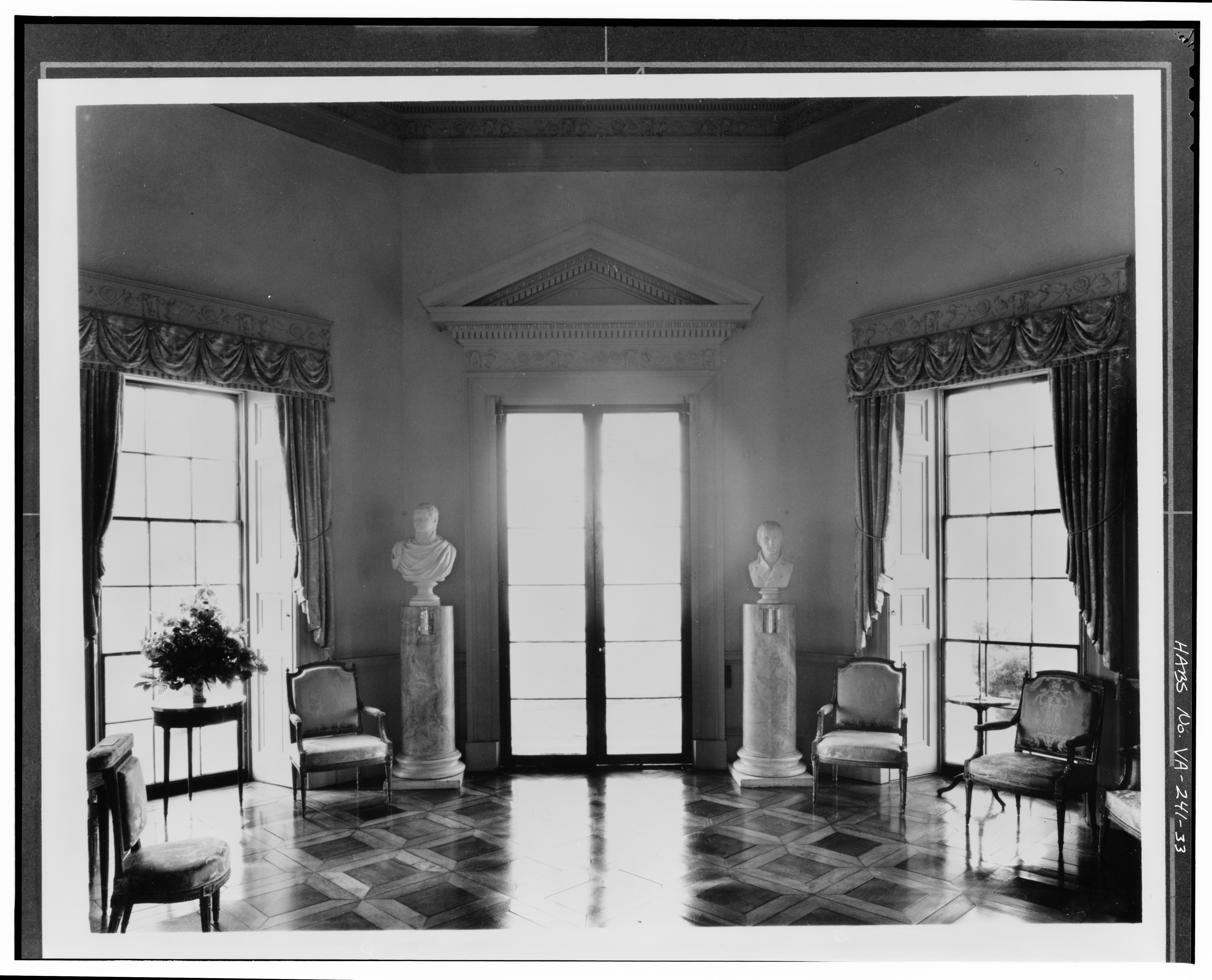
Interior Drawing Room, Monticello

Randolph and her children lived primarily at Monticello after Thomas Jefferson's retirement in 1809. While her husband was the governor of Virginia from 1819 to 1822, she continued to live at Monticello. This was done partly to save money. She managed the household activities at the plantation. She had her own room at Monticello where she was generally on her own. Her husband, increasingly estranged from his family, visited Monticello occasionally. Concerned about the family's finances and loss of income if her husband served in the military during the War of 1812, Randolph convinced President James Monroe to give him a more lucrative, temporary tax collectorship post.

With three of her children—Mary, Cornelia, and Thomas—she edited the first collection of Jefferson's writings for publication. She worked at spreading untrue claims that denied his paternity of the Hemings children and that would put her father in the best light.

Randolph devoted much of her life to her father's declining years. She had separated from her husband, who was said to suffer from alcoholism and mental instability. By the summer of 1825, Tom Randolph lived in a small house he owned in North Milton.

== Debt (1825–1826) ==
Randolph dealt with the strain of financial concerns over the debts of her husband, her father-in-law Thomas Mann Randolph Sr., and her father upon their deaths. They became indebted due to declining land values, risky investments, failed crops and needy relatives. As a result, Randolph's daughters were threatened to live a life of spinsterhood.

Thomas Mann Randolph sold the Varina plantation in 1825 to Pleasant Akin or Aiken of Petersburg. Edge Hill plantation, along with its crops, buildings, animals, and slaves, was foreclosed in 1825 and the sale proceeds failed to pay back all the family's creditors. The purchaser at the foreclosure auction, who took possession in January 1826, was Randolph's eldest son, Thomas Jefferson Randolph.

== Later years and death (1826–1836) ==
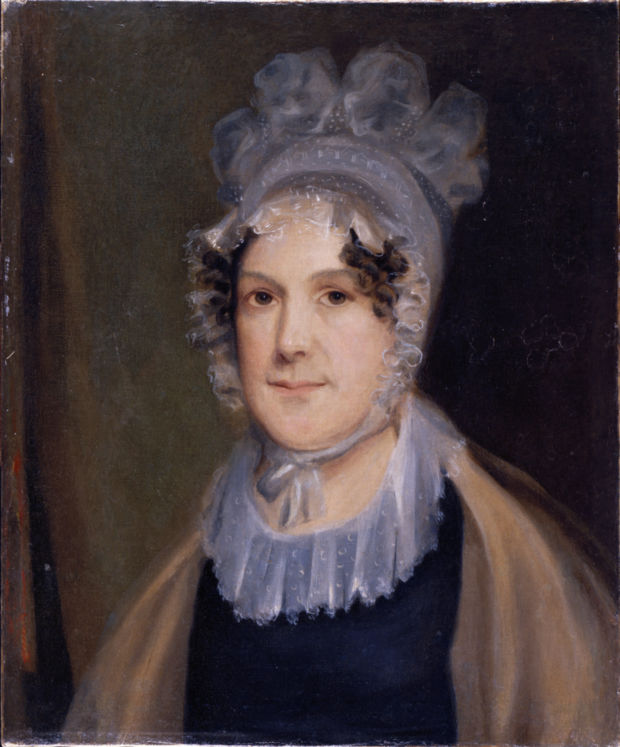
James Westhall Ford, Martha Jefferson Randolph, 1823, Monticello, Thomas Jefferson Foundation. At the time of the portrait, Randolph was 51 years of age and was the mother of eleven children.

Jefferson describes Randolph as the "cherished companion of his youth and the nurse of his old age". Shortly before his death, he said that the "last pang of life was parting with her." Thomas Jefferson died of uremia on July 4, 1826. He was 83 years old. After his death, she inherited Monticello from her father in 1826, as well as his many debts. Her eldest son Thomas Randolph acted as executor of the estate. Except for five slaves freed in her father's will, and "giving her time" (informal emancipation) to Sally Hemings, they sold the remainder of the 130 slaves at Monticello to try to settle the debts.

Randolph put Monticello on the market two weeks following her father's death in July 1826. She attempted to sell it through a lottery, but was unable to sell it until 1831 to a James S. or James T. Barclay in 1831. After having been on the market for five years, the plantation sold for $7,000, one-tenth of its $71,000 value. (Note: Barclay sold it in 1834 to his uncle Commodore Uriah P. Levy, a United States naval officer. He bought the Monticello mansion and 218 acres (88 hectares) for $2,800. Randolph's friends had a plan to gather the funds to buy Monticello, in accordance with Jefferson's wish that Randolph lived at Monticello throughout the remainder of her life, and that it stayed in the family. Levy purchased it, though, before they could make the necessary arrangements.)

She had a little income from her father's estate and lived "on the edge of poverty". Wanting to ensure successful careers for her family, which included her sons-in-law, she looked to Margaret Bayard Smith, who helped family members procure positions that led to successful careers in Washington. For instance, Nicholas Trist, her son-in-law, was secured the position with Henry Clay, the Secretary of State under President John Quincy Adams.

After Jefferson's death, Randolph lived with Thomas, her eldest son, at Tufton. She stayed at the home of her daughter Ellen and son-in-law Joseph Coolidge in Boston from October 1826 to May 1828. She had her two youngest children with her. She then went to her husband in June 1828 and reconciled with him. She was at his bedside when he died on the 20th of that month.

After her husband's death, she lived with her son at Edgehill estate until November 29 and then in Washington, D.C., and Boston with other married children. To generate income, she hired out her remaining slaves. She also had an income from bank stock donated in tribute of Jefferson by the states of Louisiana and South Carolina. The state legislatures each donated $10,000 to her for her support, totalling $20,000 (equivalent to $586,364 in 2025).

A school was established at Edge Hill by her unmarried daughters, Mary and Cornelia, and Patsy, who taught music there at times. Randolph also traveled to the homes of her married children in her later years.

While in Boston, Randolph wrote her final will on January 24, 1836, and returned to the Edge Hill estate in July 1836. She died there on October 10, 1836, at the age of 64 and was buried at the Monticello family graveyard.

== Slavery ==
Randolph's maternal grandfather John Wayles had two families, one with his wife Martha Epps and another with an enslaved woman Betty Hemings, whose children were owned by and served the Wayles family. In 1773, when Randolph had been married one year, her grandfather died and she inherited 135 slaves, which included her half-aunts and uncles of the Hemings family, and 11,000 acres (4,500 hectares). Another of Randolph's half-aunts, Sally Hemings (a daughter of John Wayles and Betty Hemings) who may have had children with Thomas Jefferson, lived at Monticello.

When Randolph lived in Paris, she learned that there were countries where slavery was not legal and said to her father, "I wish with all my soul that the poor Negroes were all freed". She also said, in keeping with the sentiments of her father, that she "detested" the unjust treatment of blacks, and the way that it fostered cruelty in whites. She attempted to keep slaves with their families when she could and did free some slaves, but she kept many that she later was forced to sell by creditors to settle outstanding debts. For instance, in 1827, after her father's death, she sold 130 slaves, resulting in the separation of families. The remaining slaves were her most valuable assets, and she hired them out when she could for income. She sold two more slaves in 1833. She also punished enslaved people who did not do what she wanted, sometimes physically. In 1833 Randolph's daughter Cornelia described an instance where she held a woman down while her mother whipped her, inflicting the flagellation "pretty severely."

In 1831, her son Thomas unsuccessfully lobbied for a plan for Virginia to abolish slavery gradually and colonize slaves in Africa, a proposal that Randolph supported. She also considered moving to a free state. Although she freed several slaves in her wills, she relied on their efforts throughout her life.

== In popular culture ==
Martha Jefferson Randolph is the subject of the historical novel America's First Daughter by Stephanie Dray and Laura Kamoie, published in March 2016. The novel draws heavily upon Thomas Jefferson's letters.

In the 1995 film Jefferson in Paris, Martha Jefferson was portrayed by actress Gwyneth Paltrow.

In the 2000 four-hour CBS miniseries Sally Hemings An American Scandal written by Tina Andrews, Martha Jefferson was portrayed by actress Mare Winningham.

== See also ==
- Bibliography of United States presidential spouses and first ladies

Honorary titles
Preceded by Abigail Adams	First Lady of the United States; Acting; 1801–1809	Succeeded by Dolley Madison
