= William Heard =

William Heard may refer to:

- William Wright Heard (1853–1926), Governor of Louisiana, 1900–1904
- William Heard (cardinal) (1884–1973), Scottish cardinal of the Roman Catholic Church
- William H. Heard (biologist), American malacologist
- William Henry Heard (1850–1937), American clergyman and diplomat
