= Thomas Mann Randolph Jr. =

American politician (1768–1828)

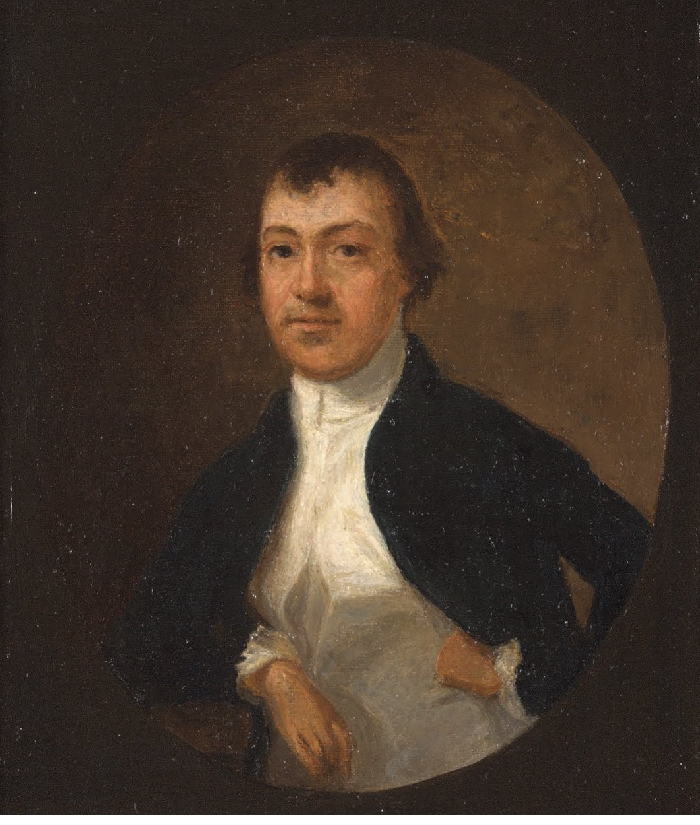
- Randolph, c. 1790

21st Governor of Virginia
- In office December 1, 1819 – December 1, 1822
- Preceded by: James Patton Preston
- Succeeded by: James Pleasants

Member of the U.S. House of Representatives from Virginia's 21st district
- In office March 4, 1803 – March 3, 1807
- Preceded by: District created
- Succeeded by: Wilson Cary Nicholas

Member of Virginia House of Delegates
- In office 1819–1820; 1823–1825

Member of the Virginia Senate
- In office 1793–1794

Personal details
- Born: October 1, 1768 Tuckahoe Plantation, Colony of Virginia, British America
- Died: June 20, 1828 (aged 59) Monticello, Virginia, U.S.
- Party: Democratic-Republican
- Spouse: Martha Jefferson (m. 1790)
- Children: 12, including Thomas, Ellen, Cornelia and George
- Parent(s): Thomas Mann Randolph Sr. Anne Cary
- Education: College of William & Mary; University of Edinburgh
- Profession: Planter, soldier, and politician

Thomas Mann Randolph Jr. (October 1, 1768 – June 20, 1828) was an American planter, soldier, and politician from Virginia. He served as a member of both houses of the Virginia General Assembly, a representative in the United States Congress, and as the 21st governor of Virginia, from 1819 to 1822. He married Martha Jefferson, the oldest daughter of Thomas Jefferson, the third President of the United States. They had eleven children who survived childhood. As an adult, Randolph developed alcoholism, and he and his wife separated for some time before his death.

== Personal life ==
=== Early life and education ===
Coat of Arms of William Randolph

Thomas Mann Randolph Jr. was born on October 1, 1768, at Tuckahoe in the Colony of Virginia. Thomas was the first son of Thomas Mann Randolph Sr. and Anne Cary Randolph, daughter of Archibald Cary. His siblings included older sisters: Mary Randolph, author of The Virginia House-Wife; Anne Cary ("Nancy") Randolph, wife of Gouverneur Morris, and younger sister, Virginia Randolph Cary, author of Letters on Female Character.

Randolph's patrilineal great-great-grandfather was immigrant William Randolph of Turkey Island. His great-grandfathers were Richard Randolph (grandfather of Ann Cary), and Thomas Randolph of Tuckahoe. The Randolphs were among the First Families of Virginia. Randolph was a lineal descendant of Pocahontas through his mother.

Randolph received his early education from his mother and private tutors, as was customary in many planter families. He attended the College of William & Mary, in Williamsburg, Virginia, and the University of Edinburgh, Scotland from 1785 to 1788. Though he did not graduate, he continued studying independently and became a respected botanist. In 1794, Randolph was elected a member to the American Philosophical Society. Thomas Mann Randolph Sr. bought land at Varina for Randolph, who made it into a profitable plantation.

=== Marriage and children ===
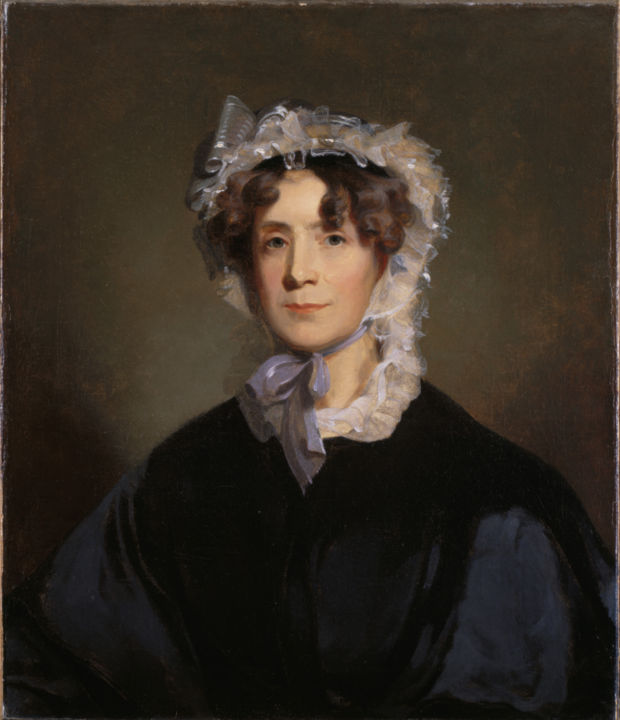
Thomas Sully, Portrait of Martha Jefferson Randolph

On February 23, 1790, Randolph married Martha Jefferson, daughter of Thomas Jefferson and his wife Martha Wayles Skelton Jefferson. The Jefferson and Randolph families had shared progenitors; They were third cousins. Thomas Jefferson was a second cousin to Randolph. Randolph's father spent part of his childhood with Jefferson at Tuckahoe. They had lands next to one another in Albemarle County. Thomas and Martha Randolph often stayed at Monticello, where Randolph oversaw business when Thomas Jefferson was away. At his father-in-law's suggestion, Randolph was a captain of the Virginia militia and a local justice of peace. The men had shared interests and viewpoints.

The Randolphs were parents to twelve children:

- Ann Cary Randolph (1791–1826), who married Charles Lewis Bankhead (1788-1833).
- Thomas Jefferson Randolph (1792–1875), who married Jane Hollins Nicholas (1798-1871), daughter of Wilson Cary Nicholas.
- Ellen Wayles Randolph (1794–1795) died young during a trip that Patsy and her husband took from July 1795 to October 1795 to improve his health.
- Ellen Wayles Randolph (1796–1876), who was named after a deceased sister, and was married to Joseph Coolidge (1798-1879)
- Cornelia Jefferson Randolph (1799–1871). In the 1830s, she established a school at Edge Hill, then her brother's estate, where she taught painting, sculpture, and drawing. She translated and published, The Parlor Gardener: A Treatise on the House Culture of Ornamental Plants. Translated from the French and Adapted to American Use. Cornelia never married.
- Virginia Jefferson Randolph (1801–1881), who married Nicholas Trist (1800–1874).
- Mary Jefferson Randolph (1803–1876). She lived at Edge Hill and helped her sister-in-law, Jane, supervise the household of her brother Thomas Jefferson Randolph. She and her sister Cornelia also visited the houses of their siblings during times of sickness. She never married.
- James Madison Randolph (1806–1834) was born at the President's House, now called the White House, on January 17, 1806.
- Benjamin Franklin Randolph (1808–1871), who married Sarah Champe "Sally" Carter (1808-1896).
- Meriwether Lewis Randolph (1810–1837), who married Elizabeth Anderson Martin (1815-1871). After his death, Martin married Andrew Jackson Donelson, a nephew of President Andrew Jackson.
- Septimia Anne Randolph (1814–1887), who married Dr. David Scott Meikleham (1804-1849).
- George Wythe Randolph (1818–1867), who briefly in 1862 was Secretary of War of the Confederate States of America, and who married Mary Elizabeth Adams Pope (1830-1871).

Martha and Thomas Randolph lived at Belmont from November 1797 until the summer of 1799. Belmont was owned by John Harvie Sr., who was a friend of the Jeffersons and father-in-law of Thomas Mann Randolph Sr. who took Gabriella Harvie as his second wife. They had decided to settle primarily in Albemarle County while maintaining the Varina estate. In January 1800, the Randolphs moved into Edge Hill (near Shadwell). After her father retired, Martha and their children lived at Monticello beginning in 1808 and including the period when Randolph was governor.

=== Family discord and loss of Varina and Edge Hill ===
His mother, Anne Cary Randolph, died in 1789. At the end of 1790, Thomas Randolph Sr., at the age of 50, married Gabriella Harvie, who was seventeen and the daughter of John Harvie. They had two children, a daughter who died in infancy and a son they named Thomas Mann Randolph (1792–1848), as if "erasing his first son from his prior marriage." Randolph's father died in 1793, and his half-brother inherited Tuckahoe. Randolph was made executor of the will, but to his dismay, he was not assigned guardian of the minor children.

After the War of 1812, Randolph experienced financial and personal problems. He inherited debt. In addition, he was not making much money due to bad crops and lower tobacco prices. Jefferson no longer sought his counsel and became more reliant on Randolph's son Thomas. His sons Thomas and George were especially close to their Grandfather Jefferson, which may have played a part in the discord between their father and grandfather. Randolph could not rise to his full potential due to his lack of common sense, inability to manage his temper, and alcoholism. His relationship with Martha and their children suffered due to his financial struggles and abusive behavior.

Randolph sold the Varina plantation in 1825 to Pleasant Akin or Aiken of Petersburg. Edge Hill plantation, along with its crops, buildings, animals, and enslaved people, was foreclosed in 1825 and the sale proceeds failed to pay back all the family's creditors. The purchaser at the foreclosure auction, who took possession in January 1826, was Randolph's eldest son, Thomas Jefferson Randolph. Randolph was no longer a landowner, which affected his ability to vote and hold office. This made him even angrier and resentful that his family had focused their energy on holding on to Monticello, which was also in financial peril, over Edge Hill. The angrier he got, the more that his family distanced themselves from him. Randolph lived apart from his family for several years, while Martha and the younger children lived at Monticello. After Jefferson's death, Martha Randolph moved with her two youngest children to Boston to gain distance from her husband, and to spend time with her older daughter.

Randolph and his wife were reconciled shortly before his death. He was cared for at Monticello, (Note: The Monticello site states that: "After her father's death in 1826, the family was forced to sell Monticello and Martha moved to Tufton to live with her eldest son, Thomas Jefferson Randolph." The biography for Randolph says that he died in 1828 at Monticello, and Monticello was not sold until 1829.) where he died on June 20, 1828. He is buried at the Monticello cemetery. After Randolph's death, Martha lived with her son at Edge Hill and other children in Boston and Washington, D.C. She was buried in the Monticello cemetery.

== Political and military career ==
=== Elected office ===
Randolph served in the Virginia State Senate in 1793 and 1794; and was elected as a Republican to the Eighth and Ninth United States Congresses, serving from March 4, 1803, to March 3, 1807. While debating in Congress about a duty on salt, John Randolph of Roanoke, Randolph's cousin and the chair of the Ways and Means Committee, made insulting remarks that could have been directed at Randolph or his father-in-law. Their argument almost led to a duel. Public opinion, set against Randolph, kept the issue alive. Jefferson sent him a note, asking him as a father not to enter a duel.

During the War of 1812, he was a colonel of the Twentieth Infantry. He served under General James Wilkinson at Sackets Harbor, New York in 1813. In Virginia, he was a lieutenant colonel for the state militia to prevent British forces from entering Richmond in 1814.

He was elected a member of the Virginia House of Delegates in 1819, 1820, and 1823 to 1825. He was elected and served as Governor of Virginia from 1819 to 1822. He was the first son-in-law of a Virginia Governor to be elected governor in his own right. As governor, he was fairly progressive, supporting canals, education, and more political representation for the ordinary people of the state; he also proposed a gradual emancipation proposal that would have freed Virginia's slaves, but this was defeated. His political career in Virginia ended in 1825, when, running for reelection to the House of Delegates from Albemarle County, Randolph finished third among as many candidates, with only the top two candidates earning election. Randolph's colleague in the previous session, William F. Gordon, received the most votes, while Charlottesville attorney Rice W. Woods finished second, garnering 215 votes to Randolph's 79.

=== After office ===
Desperate for work in late 1826, Randolph applied to and obtained employment from Secretary of War James Barbour, a former governor of Virginia, as a federal commission member to settle a boundary dispute between Georgia and the territory of Florida. The Georgia government suddenly terminated the survey on April 18, 1827, and though Barbour and President John Quincy Adams considered appointing Randolph as a federal agent to deal with the Creeks, such talk, and Randolph's political career, ended when Randolph virulently criticized the indifferent handling of the boundary expedition by Barbour and Secretary of State Henry Clay in Virginia newspapers.

== Slavery ==
Their enslaved workers followed them as they moved within the state from Varina to Belmont, and then to Edge Hill. The Manns moved to Monticello after Jefferson's presidential terms. They brought enslaved people with them, including Priscilla Hemings. She was the wife of John Hemings. Opposed to slavery on principle, the Randolphs attempted to keep their slaves' families together but faced the prospect of having to disperse the community that lived on their land, Martha wrote that "The discomfort of slavery I have borne all my life, but it's sorrows in all their bitterness I had never before conceived." When Edge Hill was foreclosed, the plantation's bondspeople were sold.

Randolph supervised stewards and overseers and the work on Mulberry Row when Jefferson was away from Monticello (such as when he was vice-president and president). They corresponded about plantation business, such as when Jefferson asked Randolph to "speak to Lilly [an overseer] as to the treatment of the nailers." Since 1794, Jefferson operated a nailery at Monticello, where boys worked. It was hard work that required "long hours in the hot, smoky workshop", but it was a very profitable enterprise. Isaac Jefferson, who had worked in the nailery, stated that making nails meant the boys would receive extra food and clothing. George Granger was a black foreman for the boys who decided in 1798 that he would no longer whip the young men. Randolph wrote to Jefferson that Granger could no longer control the boys, and the production of the nailery suffered as a result. The boys had difficulty getting up pre-dawn to work long, tedious days making nails. Randolph stated that the only solution was the whip. Jefferson disliked violence and confrontation and preferred for there to be no corporal punishment, but he relied on men who "impose[d] a vigor of discipline." Randolph later reported that the nailery was productive again because "the small ones" were being whipped. Randolph stopped managing affairs at Monticello after he became estranged from his family after around 1812.

== Notes ==
U.S. House of Representatives
Preceded by District created March 4, 1803	Member of the U.S. House of Representatives from Virginia's 21st congressional district March 4, 1803 – March 3, 1807	Succeeded by David S. Garland
Political offices
Preceded by James Patton Preston	Governor of Virginia; 1819–1822	Succeeded by James Pleasants
