= Edmund Dwight House =

Historic house in Massachusetts, United States

- U.S. National Register of Historic Places
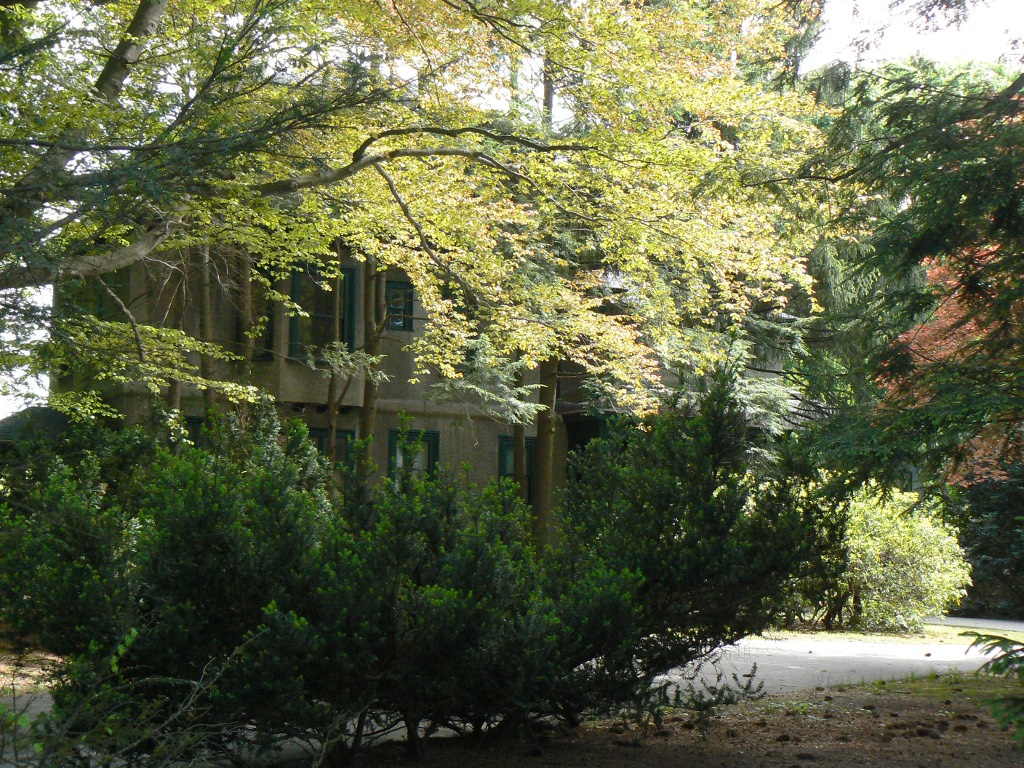

- Location within Massachusetts Location within the United States
- Location: Winchester, Massachusetts
- Coordinates: 42°26′10″N 71°9′15″W
- Built: 1858
- Architect: Robert Coit (alterations)
- Architectural style: Italianate
- MPS: Winchester MRA
- NRHP reference No.: 89000633
- Added to NRHP: July 5, 1989

The Edmund Dwight House is a historic house at 5 Cambridge Street in Winchester, Massachusetts, straddling the town line with Arlington. It was built in 1858 in an Italianate style. It was one of the first and grandest country houses built in Winchester at a time when Boston businessmen were seeking to build such houses. The house's design is believed to be based loosely on that of Jefferson's Monticello. The house is sited for an expansive view of the Upper Mystic Lake. This residence was also home to Claude Shannon, the father of Information theory, and his wife Betty Shannon. While living there, they installed a chair lift that took the rider from the home down to the lake.

The house is a 2 1/2-story wood-frame structure, originally finished in clapboard siding. It is basically rectangular, with a rounded central bay on the eastern facade, facing the lake. A single-story porch wraps around three sides of the building. Significant alterations were made to the house in the 1890s, including the stuccoing of the exterior, and the addition of a two-story ell to the northeast corner. These changes were made under the auspices of local architect Robert Coit. A second, single-story, addition was made to the northwest corner in 1985. The original 12-acre (4.9 ha) property purchased by the Dwights was subdivided c. 1940, leaving the house on just 2 acres (0.81 ha). The house's stable was then converted to a residence, and stands on an adjacent lot in Arlington.

The house was added to the National Register of Historic Places in 1989.

== See also ==
- National Register of Historic Places listings in Winchester, Massachusetts
- National Register of Historic Places listings in Arlington, Massachusetts
