= Albert Heard =

American banker and diplomat

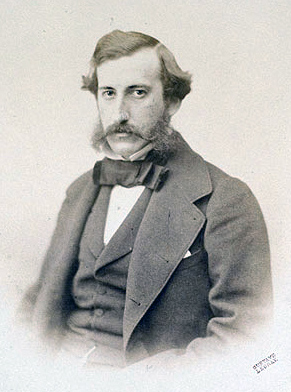
Albert Farley Heard, photo by Gustave Le Gray.

Albert Farley Heard (October 4, 1833 – March 26, 1890) was an American banker and diplomat who was the second-ranked member on the founding committee of The Hongkong and Shanghai Banking Corporation (HSBC). He was the son of Elizabeth Ann Farley and George Washington Heard, brother of Augustine Heard. After graduating from Yale University, he went to China to assist his uncle in business and ultimately succeed him in heading the management of his trading firm, Augustine Heard & Co.

== Career in China ==
Heard was born on October 4, 1833 in Ipswich, Massachusetts and graduated from Yale University in 1853, having submitted his thesis on the late medieval philosopher and reformer John Huss. Thereafter he travelled to Canton (now known as Guangzhou), China to join the family firm of Augustine Heard & Co. becoming a partner in 1856 and later managing partner. During his tenure as head of the firm, Heard fought off serious competition in the Yangtze River steamer trade from rival American firm Russell & Company.

Along with the three other Shanghai businessmen, R.C. Antrobus, James Whittal and Henry Dent, in 1860 Heard purchased 40 mu (about 24,000 square metres (260,000 sq ft)) of land within the Shanghai Race Club for cricket and other sports. He also later served as the Russian consul general in the city, and as the representative of the Chinese government in Russia. In 1887, he published The Russian church and Russian dissent, comprising orthodoxy, dissent, and erratic sects, covering multiple aspects of Russian orthodoxy. In 1857, during the Second Opium War, Heard traveled from Shanghai to Hong Kong aboard the steamer Antelope. Outside of business, Heard is known to have owned a collection of pictures by the early photographer Felice Beato.

== Return to the US ==
Heard left China in May 1873, having first conveyed a parcel of land at the corner of Aberdeen and Staunton Streets in Hong Kong and property in Macau to his brother John Heard's "protected" Chinese woman, Lam Kew-fong. Back in America, Albert Heard married Mary Allen Livingstone. He died on March 26 1890 in Washington, D.C.

== Notes ==
1. Defined as "a woman acquired by and living with a foreigner"
