= Augustine Heard =

American entrepreneur, businessman and trader

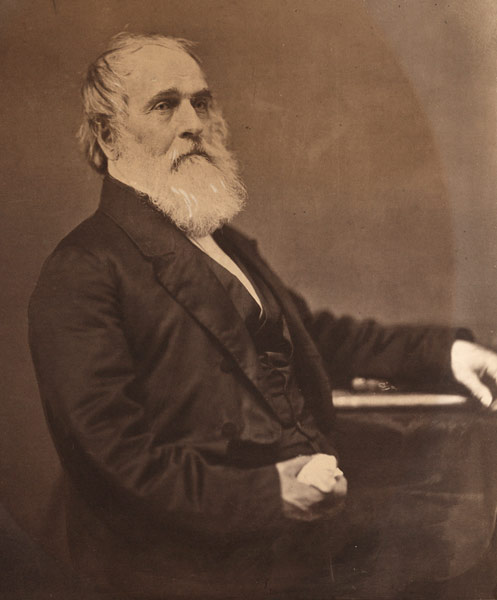
- Born: March 30, 1785
- Died: September 14, 1868 (aged 83)
- Citizenship: United States
- Education: Phillips Exeter Academy
- Occupations: Entrepreneur, businessman and trader; sea captain
- Employer: Founder of the Augustine Heard & Co. firm in China. Partner in Samuel Russell & Co.
- Known for: China trade and naval career; founded the Ipswich Public Library
- Parent(s): Father, John Heard (1744-1834)
- Relatives: Half-brother Daniel (1778-1801), nephews Albert Farley, George Farley, and Augustine Heard

Augustine Heard (March 30, 1785 – September 14, 1868) was an American entrepreneur, businessman and trader, and founder of the Augustine Heard & Co. firm in China.

== Early career ==
Augustine Heard was born into a wealthy merchant family of Ipswich, Massachusetts. His father, John Heard (1744-1834), had made his fortune by trading with the West Indies, and his half-brother Daniel (1778-1801) also worked in foreign trade with the West Indies and China. Educated at Phillips Exeter Academy in New Hampshire, Augustine did not graduate and instead, in 1803, began working for a prominent Boston, Massachusetts merchant, Ebenezer Francis. Two years later, Heard embarked as supercargo to Calcutta on one of Francis' ships. Climbing the ranks of trading companies, Heard was, by 1812, captain of his first ship, the brig Caravan. He pursued his naval career for 18 years, becoming a renowned navigator and his feats became the subject of poems and stories. In 1818, Heard purchased 50 shares of the Suffolk Bank, a clearinghouse bank on State Street in Boston.

== China ==
In 1830, at the age of 45, Heard settled in Canton, China, where he became partner in the trading firm of Samuel Russell & Co., by then the leading American opium dealer in China. In 1834, he returned to Boston for health reasons, and managed his business from there. He also developed close ties with his nephews, the sons of his brother George Washington Heard, and developed a business relationship with them. Heard set up his own company, Augustine Heard & Co., in 1840 with Joseph Coolidge and John Murray Forbes, friends and partners who had remained in Canton. The firm became successful, and grew rapidly to become the third largest American firm in China by trading in tea and opium. Heard returned to China the following year and actively directed his firm until 1844 when he gradually started scaling down his involvement, travelling extensively to Europe and America, leaving the firm's operations in the hands of his partners and family members. By 1850, as well as the head office in Canton, the firm had branches in Hong Kong, Shanghai and Fuchow with agencies in Amoy and Ningpo.

As with many other American firms involved in trade with China at the time, Augustine Heard & Co. encountered financial difficulties in the 1870s and finally went bankrupt in 1875. A sister company bearing the same name established in the United States for the purpose of running operations from the U.S. side, had been created on April 13, 1861 and was dissolved on May 31, 1865.

== Retirement ==
In the late 1840s, Heard started developing his business in Ipswich, Massachusetts, and co-founded with his brother and brother-in-law the Ipswich Manufacturing Company in 1848, of which he became sole proprietor in 1852. Heard remained in Ipswich, where he founded the Ipswich Public Library, until his death following a short illness in 1868.

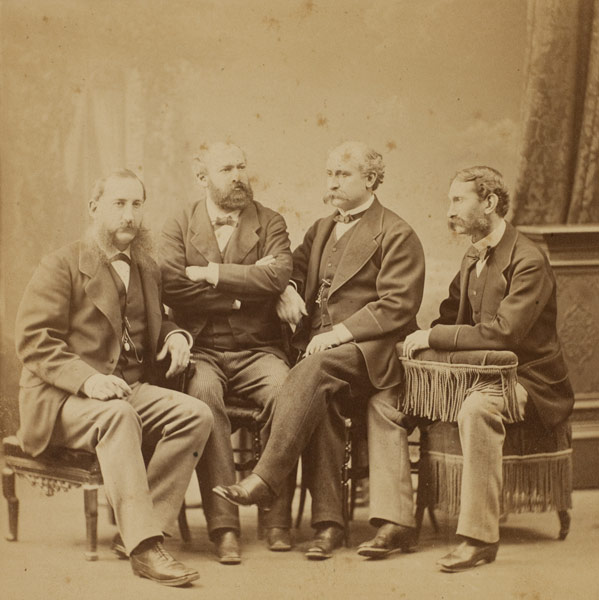
Heard's four nephews. From left to right: Albert, George, John II, and Augustine II.

== Family ==
Augustine Heard largely entrusted control over Augustine Heard & Co. to members of his family. Among his family members who were involved in running the firm were his nephews Albert Heard, George Farley Heard, namesake Augustine Heard and John Heard, with whom he had returned to China in 1844. Nephew Augustine later became U.S. Minister to Korea.
