= John Heard =

John Heard may refer to:

- John Heard (actor) (1946–2017), American actor
- John Heard (basketball) (born 1939), Australian Olympic basketball player
- John Heard (musician) (1938–2021), jazz bassist
- John T. Heard (1840–1927), American politician
- John W. Heard (1860–1922), American army general
- John Isaac Heard (1787–1862), Irish Member of the UK Parliament for Kinsale

== See also ==
- Johnny Herd (born 1989), English footballer
- John Hurd (1914–2001), fencer
- John Hurt (1940–2017), English actor
