= Harry Heard =

Australian rules footballer

Personal information
- Full name: Harry Gordon Heard
- Born: 3 December 1920; Ararat, Victoria
- Died: 19 October 1978 (aged 57); Belmont, Victoria
- Original team: Geelong High School Old Boys
- Height: 180 cm (5 ft 11 in)
- Weight: 74 kg (163 lb)

Playing career^{1}
Years	Club	Games (Goals)
1941	Geelong	5 (2)
- ^{1} Playing statistics correct to the end of 1941.

Harry Gordon Heard (3 December 1920 – 19 October 1978) was an Australian rules footballer who played with Geelong in the Victorian Football League (VFL).
