= Augustine Heard II =

American Minister Resident and Consul General to Korea

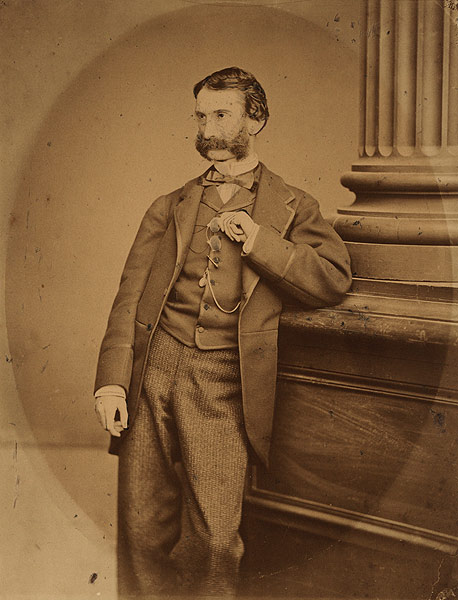

United States Consul General to Korea
- In office May 26, 1890 – June 27, 1893
- President: Benjamin Harrison
- Preceded by: Hugh A. Dinsmore
- Succeeded by: John M. B. Sill

Personal details
- Born: 1827 Ipswich, Massachusetts, U.S.
- Died: 1905 (aged 78)
- Relations: George Washington Heard (father); Elizabeth Ann (Farley) Heard (mother)
- Education: Harvard University
- Profession: entrepreneur, businessman and trader, U.S. Ambassador

Augustine F. Heard II, also known as Augustine F. Heard Jr., (1827–1905) was an American Minister Resident and Consul General to Korea. He served from January 30, 1890, until June 27, 1893. He was born in Ipswich, Massachusetts. He was the nephew of Augustine Heard. He graduated from Harvard College in 1847. Upon the outbreak of the Sino-Japanese war in 1894, he supported a policy of international guarantee by the powers to keep Korea free from Japanese control.

== See also ==
- Ambassadors of the United States
- Foreign relations of North Korea
- Foreign relations of South Korea
- North Korea–United States relations
- South Korea–United States relations
