= Ellen Randolph Coolidge =

Granddaughter of Thomas Jefferson (1796–1876)

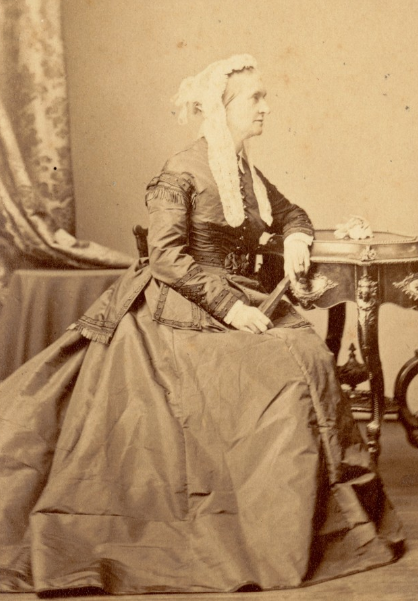
- Sergey Lvovich Levitsky, Ellen Randolph Coolidge, 1861, Stevens-Coolidge Place Collection, The Trustees of Reservations, Archives & Research Center, Worcester, Massachusetts
- Born: Eleonora Wayles Randolph; October 1796 (Note: There are geneaological records, which are not reliable sources, that state that Ellen was born October 13, 1796. The Monticello site states that she was born in October 1796. Not to be confused with a child of the same name born in 1794 and died in 1795.); Monticello, Albemarle County, Virginia
- Died: April 21, 1876 (aged 79)
- Resting place: Mount Auburn Cemetery, Cambridge, Massachusetts
- Spouse: Joseph Coolidge (m. 1825)
- Children: T. Jefferson Coolidge and five other children
- Parent(s): Martha Jefferson Randolph and Thomas Mann Randolph
- Relatives: Thomas Jefferson (grandfather)

Eleonora Wayles "Ellen" Randolph Coolidge (October 1796 – April 21, 1876) was the granddaughter of Thomas Jefferson and daughter of Martha Jefferson Randolph and Thomas Mann Randolph. Coolidge had a close relationship with Jefferson, serving as an assistant until her marriage.

== Early years ==
Coat of Arms of William Randolph

Born in October 1796, Ellen (Eleonora) Wayles Randolph was the daughter of Thomas Mann Randolph and Martha Jefferson Randolph. Coolidge was a well-educated woman, proficient in languages. She learned Latin, French, and other modern languages. Martha, a very well-educated woman for the time, taught her children. While some of the children struggled with their studies, by four years of age, Coolidge was deemed "wonderfully apt" by her mother. In November 1802, during Jefferson's first term as president, she traveled with her brother Jeff and her mother to Washington, D.C. for a six-week visit at the President's House (now called the White House). Martha left her older and younger children at Monticello. Coolidge frequently wrote to the president about her studies, what books she had been reading, and her poultry and gardening.

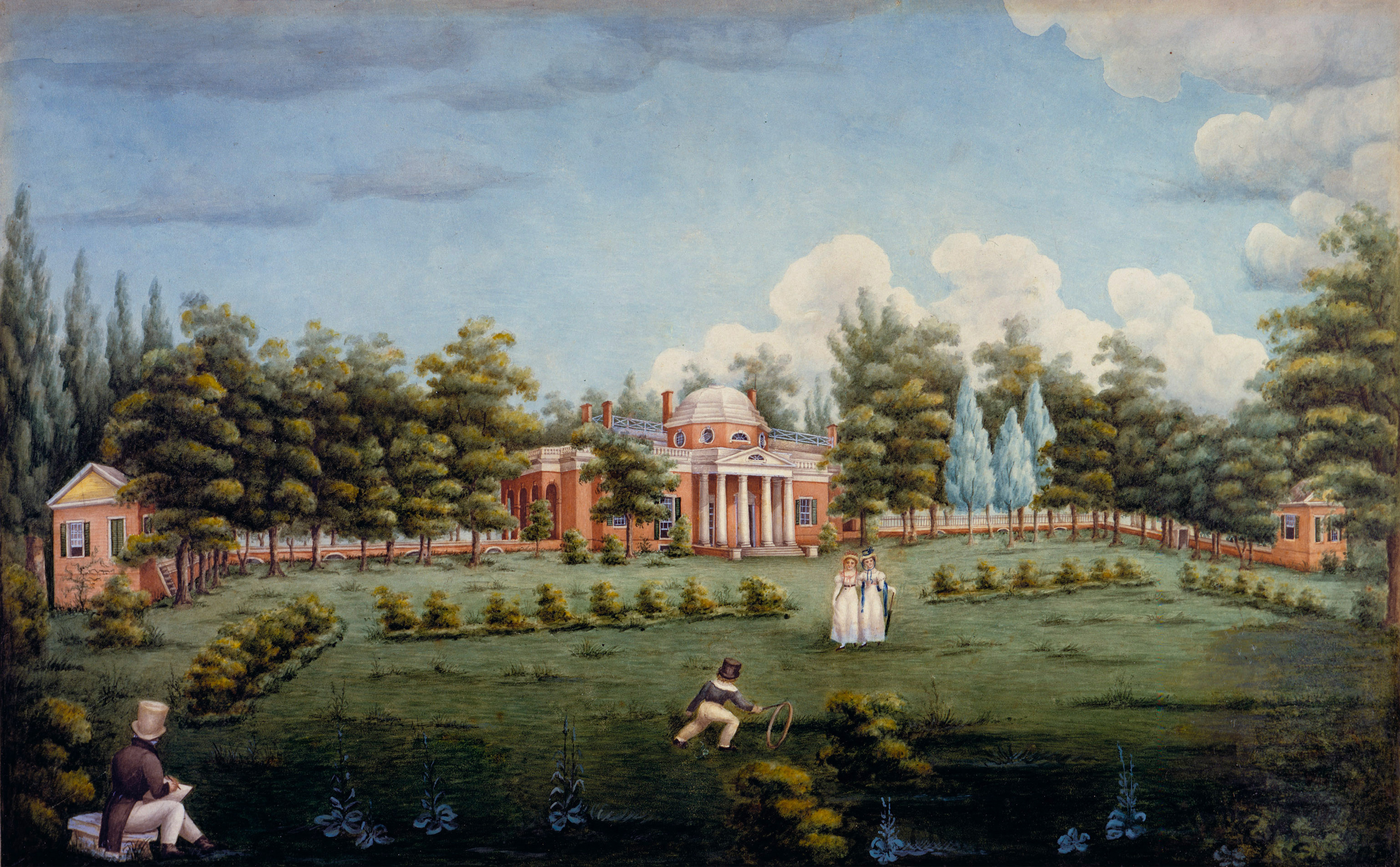
Jane Braddick Peticolas, View of the West Front of Monticello and Garden, watercolor, 1825

Coolidge and her siblings had an "idyllic rural life", playing outdoors on the plantation's vast lawn, acquiring a good education, and enjoying civility at Monticello. In 1825, Coolidge commissioned her friend Jane Braddick Peticolas to capture a scene of her brother playing on the lawn as he is watched by two sisters.

== Relationship with her grandfather ==
Thomas Jefferson, Coolidge's grandfather, returned to Monticello after he completed his terms as president. Martha Jefferson Randolph and her children also lived at Monticello at that time. She was close to her maternal grandfather who took her on trips to Poplar Forest. He also paid for her travel to Philadelphia, Baltimore, Washington, D.C., and Richmond. She was so close to Jefferson, acting as his assistant and as his agent when traveling, that it was thought she might not marry.

While at Monticello, Coolidge had an enslaved girl, Sally Cottrell as a maid in 1809, when the girl was age 13.

== Marriage ==
In 1824, Ellen Wayles Randolph met Joseph Coolidge when he visited Virginia. They were married on May 27, 1825, at Monticello, during which she became Ellen Randolph Coolidge. The couple moved to Boston and Joseph hired Cottrell out to Thomas Hewitt Key at the University of Virginia. Coolidge's personal belongings were shipped to Boston, but were lost at sea. Jefferson replaced her desk with the one he used to write the Declaration of Independence upon. It is now in the collection of the Museum of American History of the Smithsonian Institution.

Coolidge had five pregnancies in six years, including a set of twin boys. She primarily raised her six children as a single parent because Joseph Coolidge was overseas in China and Europe for extended periods of time.

Coolidge went overseas in 1838 and 1844. She recorded her visit to London in 1838 in a journal. The Coolidges lived in Switzerland and in Europe for several years, beginning in 1844. Ellen Coolidge died on April 21, 1876. She was buried in Cambridge, Massachusetts at the Mount Auburn Cemetery.

== Jefferson's papers ==
Thomas Jefferson's personal papers, passed down to the Coolidge family, were donated to the Massachusetts Historical Society. Among the collection of 9,000 manuscripts given to the society was a "much edited" draft of a letter from Jefferson to Coolidge on August 27, 1825. He expressed how much she was missed and how her new home state would be more "congenial to your mind" since slavery ended in Massachusetts in the 1780s. The collection of manuscripts included architectural drawings, farm books, and the draft for Notes on the State of Virginia.

== Sources ==
- Kierner, Cynthia A. (2012). Martha Jefferson Randolph, daughter of Monticello : her life and times. Chapel Hill : University of North Carolina Press. ISBN 978-0-8078-3552-4.
