= Edge Hill (Shadwell, Virginia) =

Historic house in Virginia, United States

- U.S. National Register of Historic Places
- Virginia Landmarks Register
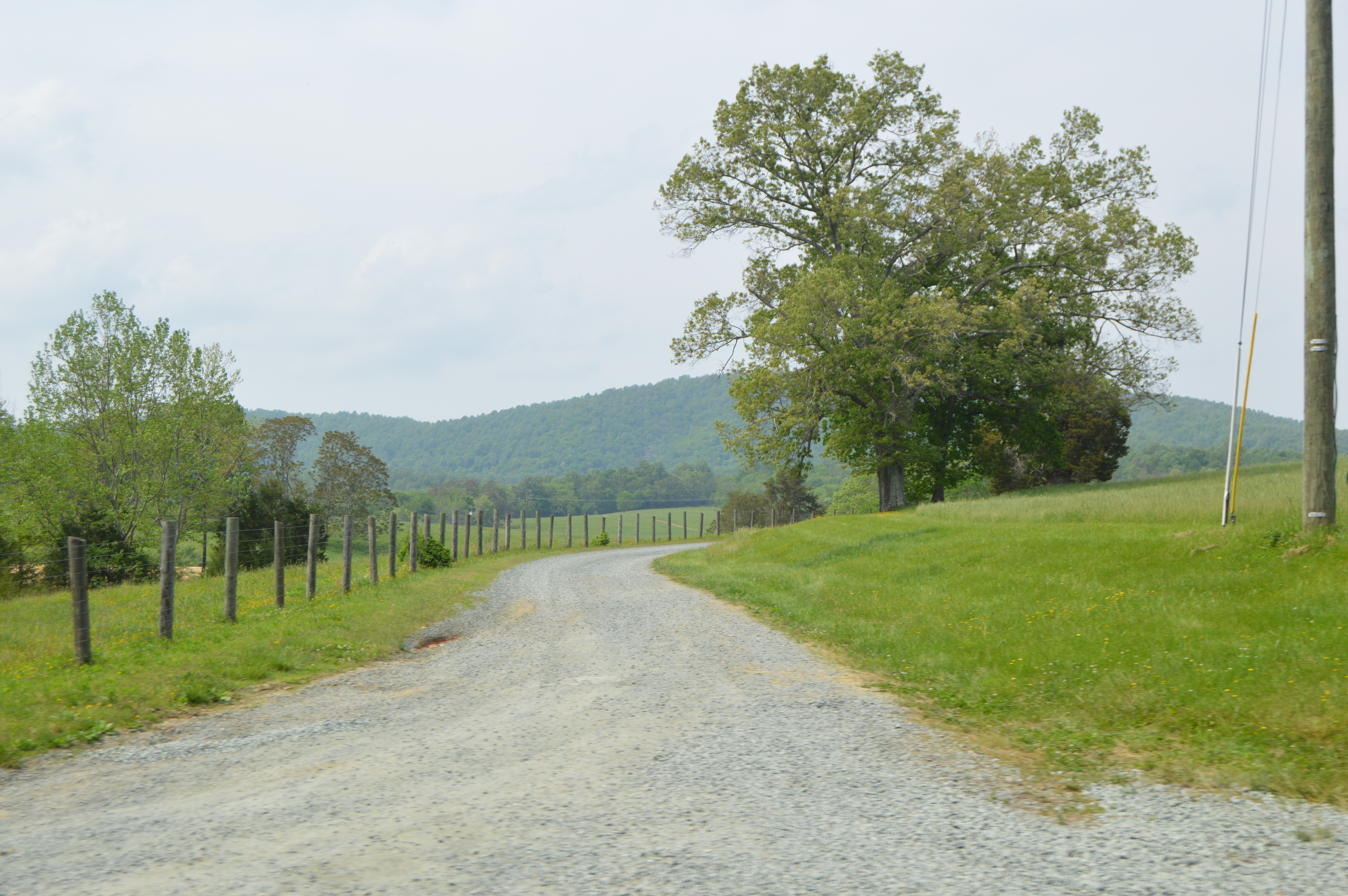
- Entrance to the estate

- Location within Virginia Location within the United States
- Location: North of Shadwell on State Route 22, near Shadwell, Virginia
- Coordinates: 38°1′2″N 78°23′42″W
- Area: 96 acres (39 ha)
- Built: c. 1799, 1828, 1916
- Architectural style: Greek Revival, Federal
- NRHP reference No.: 82004537
- VLR No.: 002-0026

Significant dates
- Added to NRHP: February 10, 1983
- Designated VLR: June 15, 1982

Edge Hill, also known as Edgehill and Edgehill Farm, is a historic house located near Shadwell in Albemarle County, Virginia, United States.

== Early history ==
William Randolph of Tuckahoe acquired 2400 acres as a land grant from King George II in 1735, and it was inherited by his son Thomas Mann Randolph, Sr. of Tuckahoe. In 1790, he gave it and his Varina plantation near Richmond to his son Thomas Mann Randolph, Jr. as a wedding gift when the younger Randolph married Martha Jefferson, daughter of Virginia governor and U.S. President Thomas Jefferson.

The younger Randolphs came to prefer the cooler mountain air of Albemarle County, so they built a one-story, wood-frame structure on the property about 1799, but they preferred living at Monticello. Randolph Jr. acted as an overseer at Jefferson's plantation as well as ran this one, but also ran up and inherited great debt. The current two-story, brick main house dates from 1828, and was rebuilt in 1916, after a fire gutted the interior. Thomas Jefferson Randolph, one of Randolph Jr.'s sons who became Thomas Jefferson's favorite grandson and beneficiary of his papers as well as executor of his estate, acquired his debt-ridden father's estate (house, land and slaves) at an auction on January 2, 1826. About two years later, he hired William B. Phillips and Malcolm F. Crawford (local master mason and master carpenter, respectively) to build this house in the style of Monticello (which often can be viewed from it), the University of Virginia and other historic Charlottesville properties.

== Edge Hill School for Girls ==
That original Edgehill structure remains on the property, having been rolled to the hilltop and used as a private academy run by Jane Hollins Nicholas Randolph beginning in 1829 until about 1850 and as an academy for young ladies from 1867 until 1900, as well as used an office.

== Later years ==
The property passed out of the Randolph family in 1902, following the death of Carolina Ramsay Randolph. It was added to the National Register of Historic Places in 1982.

Edward Dickinson Tayloe, grandson of Benjamin Ogle Tayloe, was conveyed a 173.8-acre parcel of the plantation on February 5, 1937.
