= Gardens of Monticello =

Historic garden in Virginia, US

Coordinates: 38°0′33″N 78°27′8″W

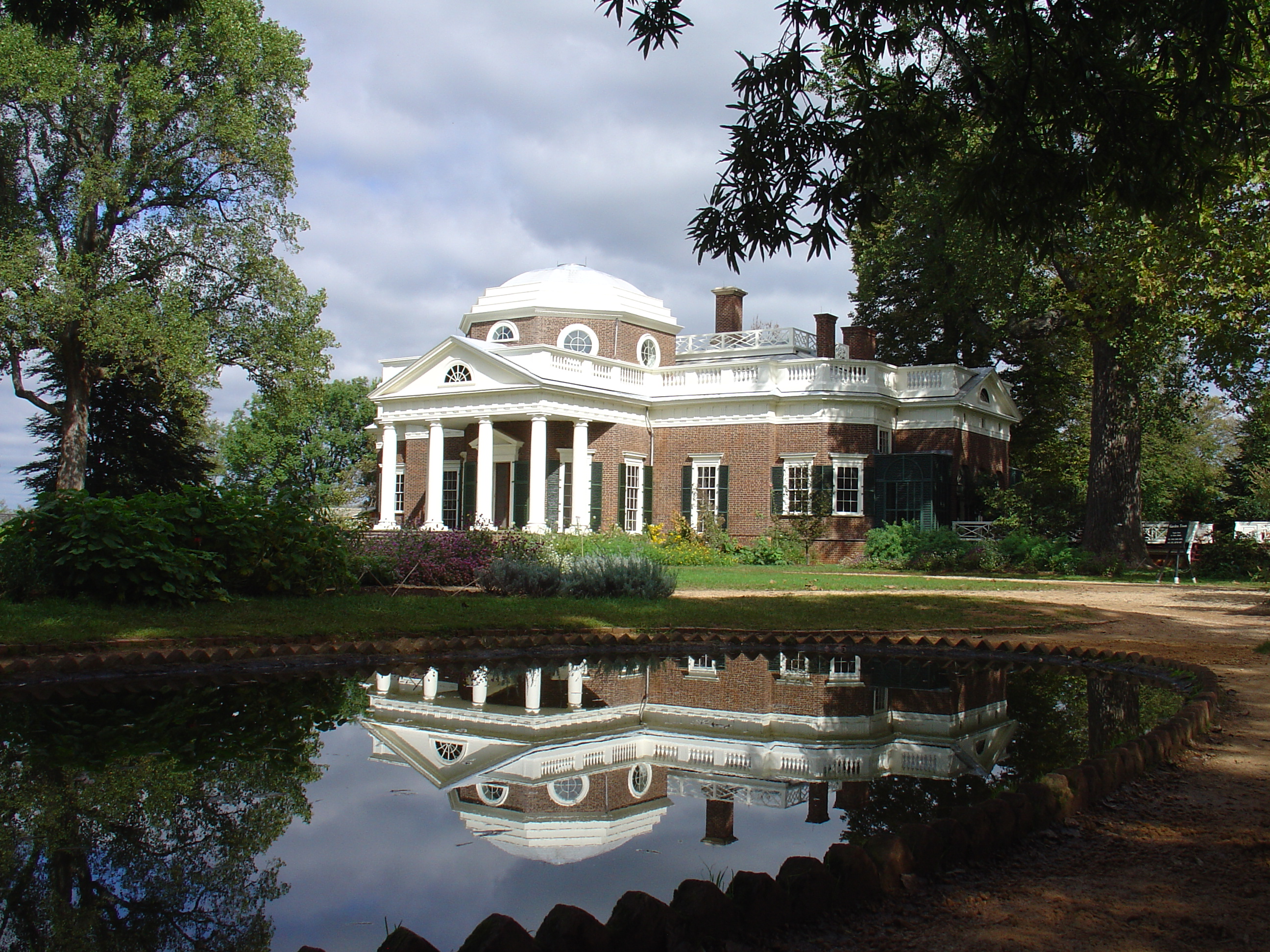
Monticello

The Gardens of Monticello were gardens first designed by Thomas Jefferson for his plantation Monticello near Charlottesville, Virginia. Jefferson's detailed historical accounts of his 5,000 acres provide much information about the ever-changing contents of the gardens. The areas included a flower garden, a fruit orchard, and a vegetable garden. Jefferson, a connoisseur of trees, flowers, and gardening techniques, was highly interested in experimental planting and directed the design of the gardens, which contained many exotic seeds and plants from his travels abroad.

The gardens declined after Jefferson's death in 1826, when his estate was encumbered with debt. Since 1938, when the Thomas Jefferson Foundation invited its participation, the Garden Club of Virginia has worked to restore and maintain the gardens with historical accuracy.

== History ==
Thomas Jefferson's interest in flowers and planting can be dated to 1766, when he began documenting his naturalistic observations in his Garden Book. Jefferson wrote detailed descriptions of the blooming patterns of various species of flowers in his family garden at his house in Shadwell, Virginia. Jefferson's interest was also sparked by the extensive literature on the subject of gardening including Philip Miller's The Gardener's Dictionary, Bernard McMahon's The American Gardener's Calendar and Thomas Whately's Observations on Modern Gardening. His approach to gardening was heavily influenced by Thomas Whaley's work and his description of the technique of naturalistic gardening.

Naturalistic design features curvilinear paths, the informal planting of flowers, unregimented, borders, wild flowers, and asymmetrical forms. Jefferson first toured English gardens in 1786 and grew especially fond of the naturalistic gardens he observed, compared to the more formal Parisian gardens. These English gardens influenced Jefferson's design of his own garden.

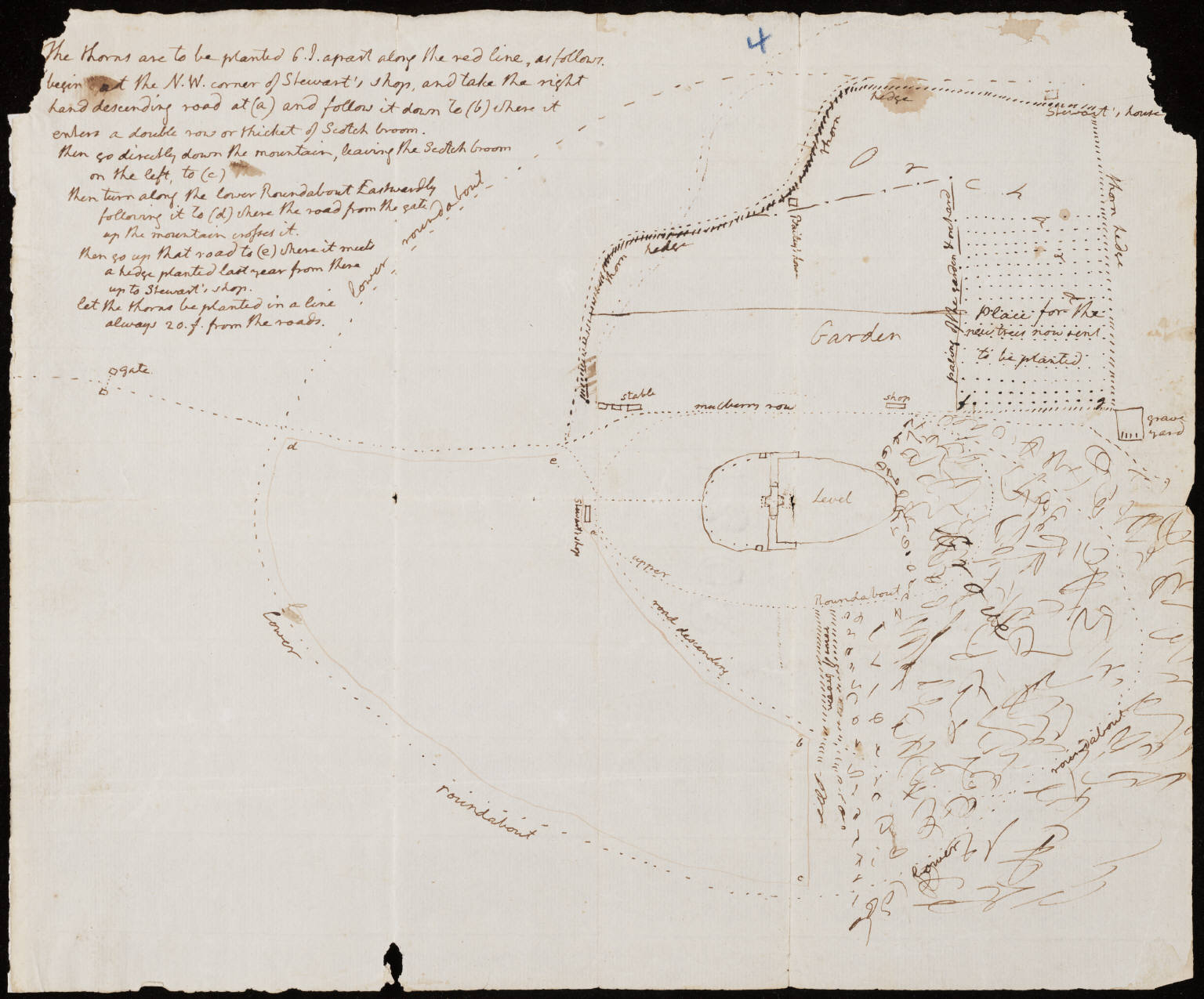
Jefferson's written plans for the gardens at Monticello

Jefferson inherited Monticello in 1757 and moved there in 1770. There is little documentation of any planting until 1807, most likely due to Jefferson's travels to France in 1784 and the preliminary landscaping that had to be completed. After the land was cleared, roads were built, and trees and shrubs were planted, Jefferson began planning the layout of his gardens. He collected many plants from the surrounding countryside, but also from abroad. André Thouin, Jefferson's friend and the Superintendent of the Jardin des Plantes at Paris, sent Jefferson seeds from Europe. The gardens contained many exotic species, including the empress tree from China and Japan Jefferson also had flowers from nurseries sent to him up the James and Rivanna rivers to a town near Monticello. Supplying water to the many plants at Monticello was a continuous problem for Jefferson. In 1808 Jefferson began the construction of four cisterns to collect water channeled from the roofs of buildings into gutters.

During his presidency, Jefferson made frequent visits to Monticello, often bringing with him new plants and flowers to be planted. While away, Jefferson wrote instructions to Edmund Bacon, his overseer. Most of the planting was done from 1808 to 1812. After Jefferson's death in 1826, the conditions of the gardens declined rapidly. Parts of the property were sold to pay off the large debts of his estate. New owners plowed land and planted paper mulberries and silkworm, which had the potential to generate large profits at the time.

In 1923 the Thomas Jefferson Memorial Fund (now Thomas Jefferson Foundation) was established and purchased large portions of the Monticello property. The Garden Club of Virginia was later enlisted to restore the gardens. They found that Jefferson had left extensive notes on his original planting, as well as instructions. The original plan for the gardens written by Jefferson in 1807 was found and used as the basis for the restoration project. The original beauty of the Monticello Gardens has been restored with great accuracy. Visitors can see the oval and circular flower beds around the house which Jefferson had designed and enjoyed nearly 200 years before.

== Horticulture and design ==
=== Flowers ===
A winding walk is bordered by flower beds, and twenty oval beds are planted at the corners of the house. The twenty oval beds were each planted with a different flower species with bulbs and seeds provided mainly by Bernard McMahon, a Philadelphia nurseryman. The plans for the winding flower border were laid out in 1808 and the garden was planted and tended to by Jefferson's daughters as well as elderly slaves. The winding path, modeled after English gardens which Jefferson had admired in 1786, was located behind the house. Instead of rigid, straight lines, the garden took a more natural, curved path. To keep the garden organized, Jefferson divided the border into 10-foot sections and had each section planted with a different species of flower.

=== Vegetable ===
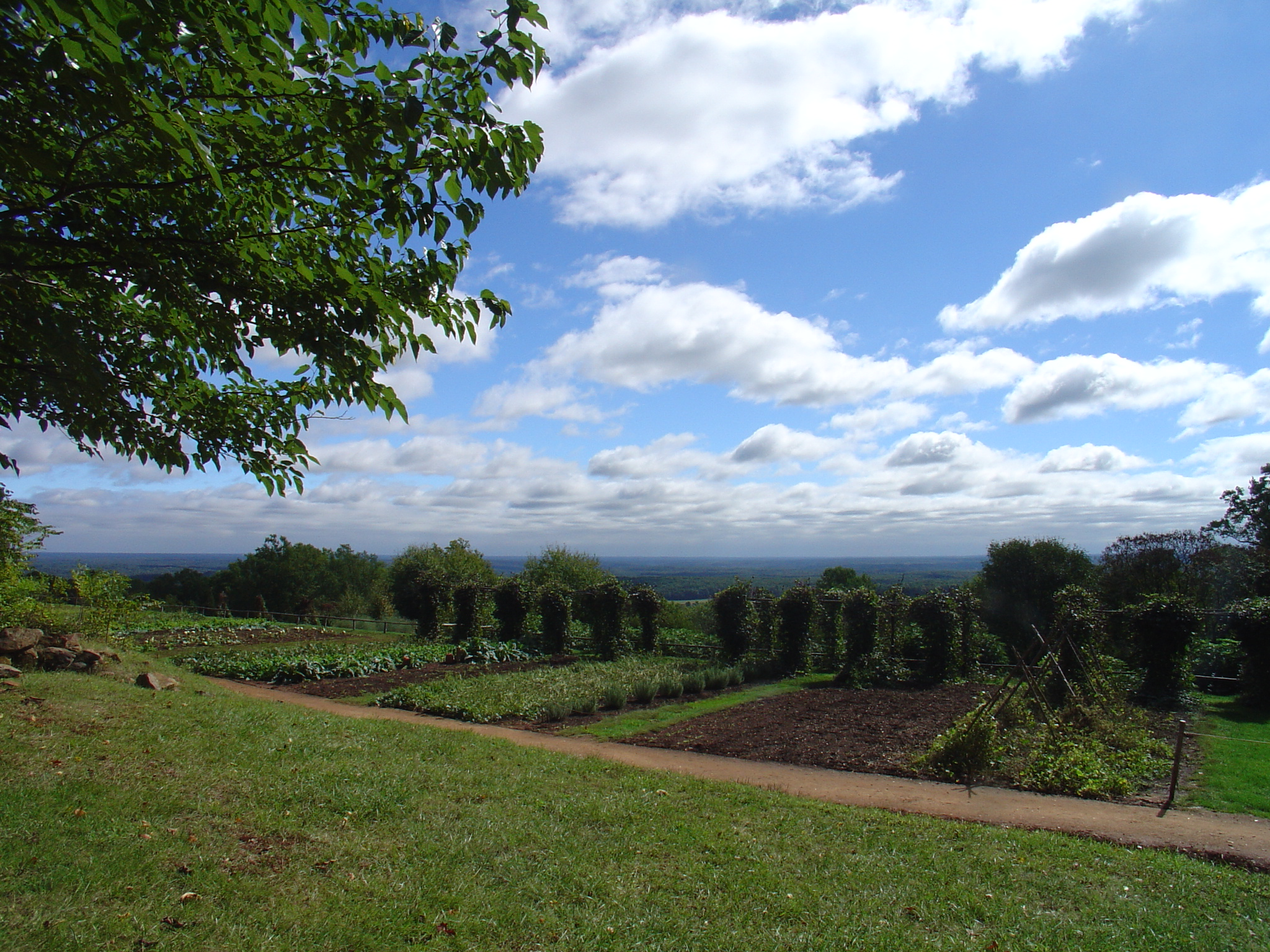
Monticello Vegetable Garden

The vegetable garden at Monticello was started in 1770. In 1806 a terrace system was introduced, to create a flat plateau that was hewed from the side of the hill and supported by a giant stone wall. Because of the location in the side of the hill, the climate was slightly warmer, allowing for a longer, warmer growing season. The 1,000-foot garden was divided into 24 different sections, and the vegetables were grouped by which part of the plant would be harvested. The vegetable garden was built and maintained through slave labor.

=== Orchards ===
Monticello had two orchards, vineyards, berry patches, and a nursery, all known by Jefferson as his "fruitery." The North orchard included only apple and pear trees that were used by Jefferson to produce ciders. The South orchards were planted around the vineyards and berry patches and included fruits such as apple, peach, cherry, pear, plum, nectarine, almond, apricot, and quince. Underneath the vegetable terrace was a large vineyard with both native and foreign species of vines. Jefferson was also famous for his berry squares. These patches of berries were used both for fruit and Jefferson's experiments at growing tropical fruit in the Virginia climate.

== Purposes ==
Thomas Jefferson's gardens had many different uses. They were used mainly to produce food and drink for the family, guests and slaves. The fruit was picked for fruit to eat, and processed for apple cider, brandy, and livestock feed. Jefferson incorporated many European trees into his fruit garden, while also maintaining a New World, Virginian feel. The vegetable gardens were used to grow tomatoes, beans, carrots, and cabbage. They were cultivated for products which Jefferson entered into food contests. The vegetable gardens were also where Jefferson did much of his experimenting. He imported many exotic vegetables, and planted seeds from other American regions, which were brought back to Virginia by Lewis and Clark. He hoped to find the best type of each vegetable by planting a variety of each. Jefferson's gardens were a major source of beauty and entertainment at Monticello. He led his guests on numerous tours, especially to visit his "pet trees", and enjoy the shade they provided.

== Slave gardens and root cellars ==
=== Purpose ===
Slave gardens were an integral part of plantation life. The gardens were made near slave quarters and fenced in with saplings, branches, and vines, and root cellars were located underneath the slave homes. Based on the observations of travelers, the gardens were small in comparison to the other gardens on the plantation. Slaves grew their own fruit and vegetables to supplement their rations. Vegetables included lima beans, pole beans, cabbages, collards, corn, cymlings (pattypan squash), onions, peanuts, black-eyed or other field peas, potatoes (red or sweet), and potato pumpkins. Fruits included apples, cherries, peaches, watermelons, and muskmelons. Chickens and eggs were also produced. At some plantations, some slaves were healthier than the white family living in the great house because they ate more fresh produce. The slaves benefited in other ways from the food they produced. They grew some crops out of season, and could sell them to the master and his family. They sold their produce and poultry to other plantations or in local markets if they could get to a town. The plantation mistress bought produce from the slaves. Records kept by Martha Jefferson's granddaughter, Anne Carey Randolph, show that she purchased goods from over forty slaves. Jefferson's slaves benefited from the slave-master bargaining over produce. Though Monticello had a garden, it was not always a reliable food source because Jefferson liked to use his garden to experiment with different plants. The produce cultivated by the slaves was needed for meals in the house as well.

The slaves received money and business experience as a result of their gardening and poultry production. They used the money or credit to buy goods such as toys, ribbons, and kitchen utensils. Slaves developed bargaining skills by bartering with the mistress of the house or Jefferson's overseer when selling their crops.

=== Labor ===
Slaves worked in their own gardens at night or on Sundays. Although the strength of adult males was needed for groundbreaking and heavy work, most of the gardening was done by older slaves. Older slaves were assigned less plantation work, and they needed the produce from the gardens because their rations were only half that of regular adults. Though slaves shared some of the food they grew with each other, unhealthy slaves and children, who needed the nutrition most, were too weak or tired to work the garden enough to produce enough food to eat or sell.

=== Plantation owners' viewpoints ===
Planters and overseers each felt differently about slave gardens. Supporters believed that the gardens tied the slaves to the land, whereas others thought that the gardens gave the slaves too much independence and made them more likely to run away. Selling their own produce gave slaves a feeling of economic freedom, against many slave masters' wishes. Jefferson's records show that though his slaves' gardens were an important part of Monticello, at times he faced problems with slaves stealing and running away, which caused him to view the gardens more negatively.

== Jefferson's influence ==
Thomas Jefferson loved to garden. He fell in love with designing gardens immediately after his inheritance of Monticello in 1757. Jefferson wanted to construct the gardens of Monticello from his own naturalistic point of view, and thus gathered materials from travelers all over the United States and other countries as well. Many of his acquaintances knew of his passion for gardening and often sent him various seeds and plants. With this assortment of seeds, Jefferson cultivated and designed his Monticello gardens according to his vision. First, Jefferson proposed a 1000-foot vegetable garden which he called the "hanging garden." Once sown, the "hanging garden" was divided into twenty-four different growing parcels according to what was being harvested. For example, one section contained fruits, while others contained roots and leaves. Jefferson also ordered the creation of a "ferme ornee" or ornamental farm. Here, he chose to plant a large tree of varying shades of scarlet, set up rows of purple, white, and green broccoli surrounding the tree, and planted smaller cherry trees along a picturesque walkway. To complete his masterwork, Jefferson designed a pavilion to overlook his gardens and built four roads providing access to them. While Jefferson's gardens did provide his family with food, their primary purpose was to serve as his laboratory where he experimented with hundreds of different types of vegetables from all over the world. He was as meticulous in his experimentation as he had been with his design. He kept a garden book, titled the Garden Kalender, in which he documented every success and failure. He logged the exact dates his seeds were initially planted. He also noted when leaves appeared and when the flowers blossomed. Thomas Jefferson enjoyed experimenting with his gardens and working to produce fruits that were difficult to grow, such as pears, plums, and apricots, even though he rarely succeeded. In his garden book, Jefferson stated that his favorite fruit was the Carnation cherry. He believed it was "superior to all the others." Jefferson also took great interest in the production of grape vines. He aspired to make Monticello-grown wine, but he often failed at his attempts to cultivate grapes. Not willing to give up, Jefferson imported several different vines from America and Europe but never achieved his goal. Still, Jefferson's hard work did not go unnoticed. Near the end of his life, he received an award from the French Society of Agriculture for his unique invention of a plow moldboard, which assisted the cutting blade and was advancement in plow creation. He loved presenting his work to guests of Monticello and was proud that his gardens were constantly evolving throughout his life.

== Modern ==
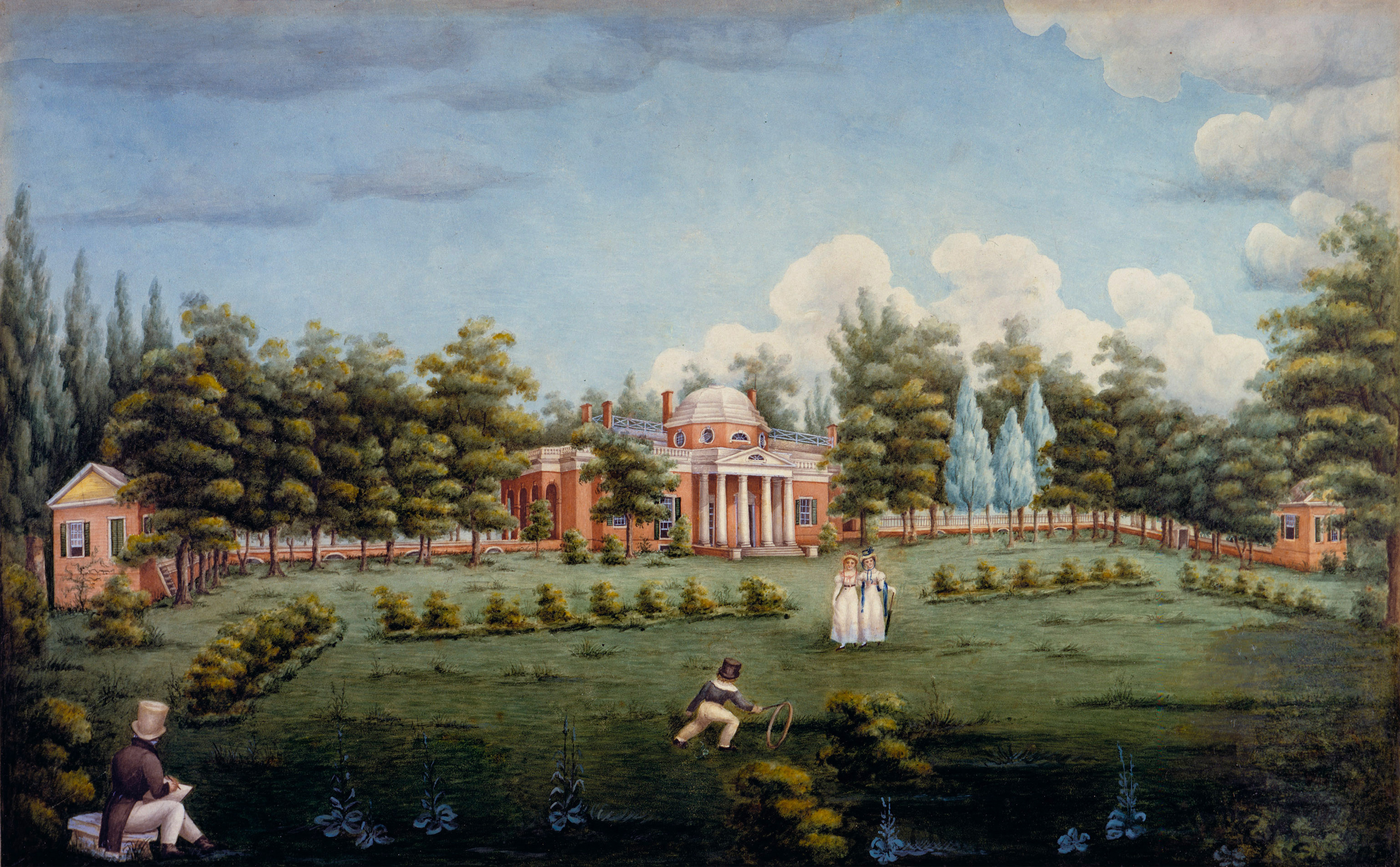
Painting of Monticello from the West Front

After the death of Thomas Jefferson, Monticello was sold to other owners. Uriah P. Levy, a 5th-generation American whose ancestors were early settlers in Charleston, purchased it in 1834 and restored it, investing in repairs which Jefferson and his family had been unable to make because of their debts. After his death, lawsuits among heirs meant the property deteriorated; finally Levi's nephew, Jefferson Monroe Levy, bought out the other heirs in 1879. Like his uncle, he invested much money in restoring the house and grounds.

In 1923, the Thomas Jefferson Memorial Foundation (now the Thomas Jefferson Foundation) was founded to preserve Monticello, as it was a larger task than one person could afford. Soon after acquiring it, the Restoration Committee hired architects to restore the house and grounds. They left Monticello and Jefferson's gardens without completing the task, especially because of the expenses during the Great Depression.

In 1938, president of the Thomas Jefferson Memorial Foundation, Stuart Gibboney, contacted The Garden Club of Virginia about Monticello. He asked the club to help restore the gardens and its members agreed. When preparing to repair the gardens, members of the Garden Club of Virginia discovered that Jefferson's garden book had been left behind. Upon reading it, they found Jefferson had included his desired plans for restoration in it. The Garden Club worked to follow Jefferson's wishes, renovating the home and gardens according to his design. The renovations brought the life and beauty of the past back to the gardens.

In addition, the Garden Club restored the cemetery of Jefferson's family, which is now owned and operated by the Monticello Association, a private lineage society of his descendants. The Club continues to maintain the grounds. Today, tourists flock to visit Monticello and its well-kept gardens.

== See also ==
- Thomas Jefferson Center for Historic Plants
- Taliaferro
