= Dan Flavin =

American minimalist artist (1933–1996)

- Born: Daniel Nicholas Flavin Jr. April 1, 1933; Jamaica, New York, US
- Died: November 29, 1996 (aged 63); Riverhead, New York, US
- Education: Columbia University
- Style: Installation art Sculpture; Site-specific installation art
- Spouses: Sonja Severdija, Tracy Harris
- Children: Stephen Flavin

Site-specific installation by Dan Flavin, 1996, Menil Collection

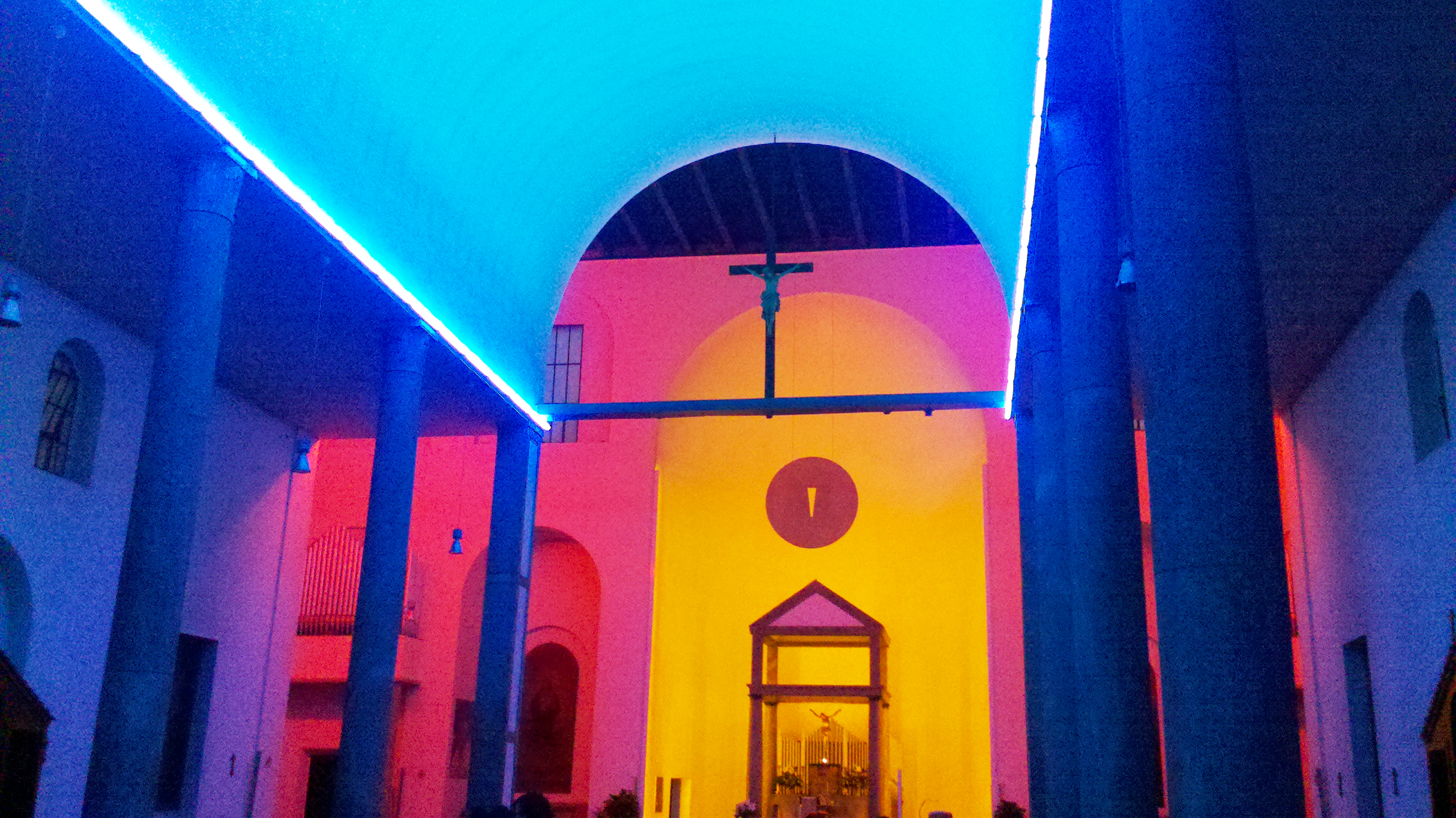
Interior of Santa Maria Annunciata in Chiesa Rossa. Milan, Italy.

Daniel Nicholas Flavin Jr. (April 1, 1933 – November 29, 1996) was an American minimalist artist famous for creating sculptural objects and installations from commercially available fluorescent light fixtures.

== Early life and career ==
Dan Flavin was born in Jamaica, New York, of Irish Catholic descent, and was sent to Catholic schools. He was named after his father, D. Nicholas Flavin. Dan Flavin studied for the priesthood at the Immaculate Conception Preparatory Seminary in Brooklyn between 1947 and 1952 before leaving to join his twin brother, David John Flavin, and enlist in the United States Air Force.

During military service in 1954–55, Flavin was trained as an air weather meteorological technician and studied art through the adult extension program of the University of Maryland in Korea. Upon his return to New York in 1956, Flavin briefly attended the Hans Hofmann School of Fine Arts and studied art under Albert Urban. He later studied art history for a short time at the New School for Social Research, then moved on to Columbia University, where he studied painting and drawing.

From 1959, Flavin was briefly employed as a mail room clerk at the Guggenheim Museum and later as guard and elevator operator at the Museum of Modern Art, where he met Sol LeWitt, Lucy Lippard, and Robert Ryman.

== Personal life ==
In 1961, he married his first wife Sonja Severdija, an art history student at New York University and assistant office manager at the Museum of Modern Art. The couple had one son, Stephen Flavin. The first marriage ended in divorce by 1979.

Flavin's twin brother, David, died in 1962.

Flavin married his second wife, the artist Tracy Harris, in a ceremony at the Guggenheim Museum, in 1992.

Flavin died in Riverhead, New York, of complications from diabetes. A memorial for him was held at Dia Art Foundation on January 23, 1997. Speakers included Brydon Smith, curator of 20th-century art at the National Gallery of Canada, Ottawa; Fariha Friedrich, a Dia Art Foundation trustee; and Michael Venezia, an artist.

== Work ==
=== Early work ===
Flavin's first works were drawings and paintings that reflected the influence of Abstract Expressionism. In 1959, he began to make assemblages and mixed media collages that included found objects from the streets, especially crushed cans.

In the summer of 1961, while working as a guard at the American Museum of Natural History in New York, Flavin started to make sketches for sculptures that incorporated electric lights. The first works to incorporate electric light were his "Icons" series: eight colored shallow, boxlike square constructions made from various materials such as wood, Formica, or Masonite. Constructed by the artist and his then-wife Sonja, the Icons had fluorescent tubes with incandescent and fluorescent bulbs attached to their sides, and sometimes beveled edges. One of these icons was dedicated to Flavin's twin brother David, who died of polio in 1962.

=== Mature work ===
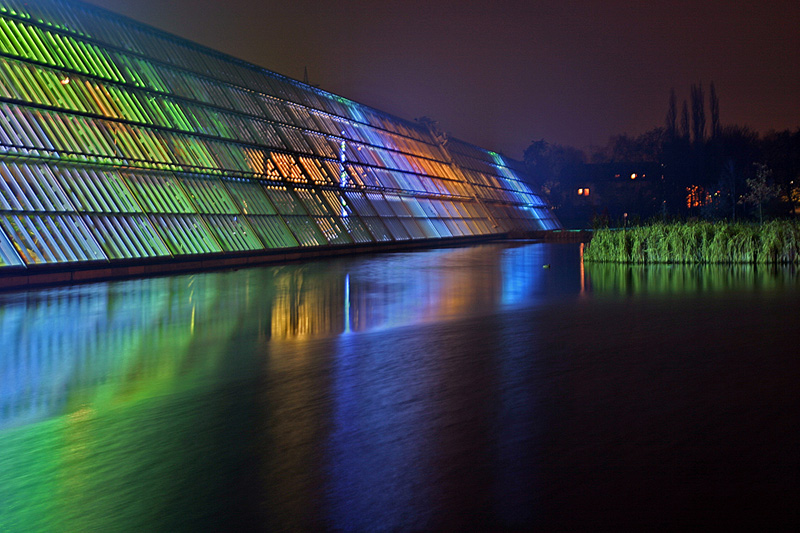
One of Flavin's last works was the lighting for a glass-enclosed arcade (1996) at the Wissenschaftspark Rheinelbe (Rhine-Elbe Science Park) in Gelsenkirchen, Germany. The arcade was designed by Uwe Kiessler; it stretches 300 metres (980 ft), and connects nine buildings.

The Diagonal of Personal Ecstasy (the Diagonal of May 25, 1963), a yellow fluorescent placed on a wall at a 45-degree angle from the floor and completed in 1963, was Flavin's first mature work; it is dedicated to Constantin Brâncuși and marks the beginning of Flavin's exclusive use of commercially available fluorescent light as a medium. A little later, The Nominal Three (to William of Ockham) (1963) consists of six vertical fluorescent tubes on a wall, one to the left, two in the center, three on the right, all emitting white light. He confined himself to a limited palette (red, blue, green, pink, yellow, ultraviolet, and four different whites) and form (straight two-, four-, six-, and eight-foot tubes, and, beginning in 1972, circles). In the decades that followed, he continued to use fluorescent structures to explore color, light and sculptural space, in works that filled gallery interiors. He started to reject studio production in favor of site-specific "situations" or "proposals" (as the artist preferred to classify his work). These structures cast both light and an eerily colored shade, while taking a variety of forms, including "corner pieces", "barriers," and "corridors". Most of Flavin's works were untitled, followed by a dedication in parentheses to friends, artists, critics and others: the most famous of these include his Monuments to V. Tatlin, a homage to the Russian constructivist sculptor Vladimir Tatlin, a series of a total of fifty pyramidal wall pieces which he continued to work on between 1964 and 1990.

Flavin realized his first full installation piece, greens crossing greens (to Piet Mondrian who lacked green), for an exhibition at the Van Abbemuseum, Eindhoven, Netherlands, in 1966. In 1968 the Heiner Friedrich Gallery in Munich exhibited the light installation "Two primary series and one secondary", presented in three exhibition rooms, which Flavin developed especially for the gallery. The collector Karl Ströher purchased the installation in the same year. Peter Iden, founding director of the Museum für Moderne Kunst Frankfurt acquired the installation together with 86 other works from the former Ströher Collection for the Frankfurt Museum. After a first presentation in 1989, it was shown in various exhibitions at the museum between 1999 and 2002. Flavin himself examined the installation in Frankfurt in February 1993 and then adapted his installation concept for the museum.

Flavin's "corridors", for example, control and impede the movement of the viewer through gallery space. They take various forms: some are bisected by two back-to-back rows of abutted fixtures, a divider that may be approached from either side but not penetrated (the color of the lamps differs from one side to the other). The first such corridor, untitled (to Jan and Ron Greenberg), was constructed for a 1973 solo exhibition at the St. Louis Art Museum, and is dedicated to a local gallerist and his wife. It is green and yellow; a gap (the width of a single "missing" fixture) reveals the cast glow of the color from beyond the divide. In subsequent barred corridors, Flavin would introduce regular spacing between the individual fixtures, thereby increasing the visibility of the light and allowing the colors to mix.

By 1968, Flavin had developed his sculptures into room-size environments of light. That year, he outlined an entire gallery in ultraviolet light at Documenta 4 in Kassel, Germany. In 1992, Flavin's original conception for a 1971 piece was fully realized in a site-specific installation that filled the Solomon R. Guggenheim Museum's entire rotunda on the occasion of the museum's reopening.

Flavin generally conceived his sculptures in editions of three or five, but would wait to create individual works until they had been sold to avoid unnecessary production and storage costs. Until the point of sale, his sculptures existed as drawings or exhibition copies. As a result, the artist left behind more than 1,000 unrealized sculptures when he died in 1996.

=== Permanent installations ===
untitled (to Tom) (1980) at the James M. Fitzgerald US Courthouse and Federal Building in Anchorage

From 1975, Flavin installed permanent works in Europe and the United States, including "Untitled. In memory of Urs Graf" at the Kunstmuseum Basel (conceived 1972, realized 1975); the Kröller-Müller Museum, Otterlo, Netherlands (1977); Hudson River Museum, Yonkers, New York (1979); United States Courthouse, Anchorage, Alaska (1979–89); the Staatliche Kunsthalle Baden-Baden, Germany (1989); the lobby of the MetroTech Center (with Skidmore, Owings & Merrill), Brooklyn, New York (1992); seven lampposts outside the Städtische Galerie im Lenbachhaus, Munich (1994); Hypovereinsbank, Munich (1995); Institut Arbeit und Technik/Wissenschaftspark, Gelsenkirchen, Germany (1996); and the Union Bank of Switzerland, Bern (1996). Additional sites for Flavin's architectural "interventions" were the Grand Central Station in New York (1976), Hamburger Bahnhof in Berlin (1996), and the Chinati Foundation in Marfa, Texas (2000). His large-scale work in colored fluorescent light for six buildings at the Chinati Foundation was initiated in the early 1980s, although the final plans were not completed until 1996. His last artwork was a site-specific work at Santa Maria Annunciata in Chiesa Rossa, Milan. The 1930s church was designed by Giovanni Muzio. The design for the piece was completed two days before Flavin's death on November 29, 1996. Its installation was completed one year later with the assistance of the Dia Center for the Arts and Fondazione Prada.

The Menil Collection in Houston, Texas states that in 1990 Dominique de Menil approached Flavin to create a permanent, site-specific installation at Richmond Hall. Two days before his death in November 1996 Flavin completed the design for the space. The artist's studio completed the work.

Dia Bridgehampton, a museum in Bridgehampton, New York opened in 1983 as the Dan Flavin Art Institute. It is run by the Dia Art Foundation and houses nine fluorescent light works by Flavin on permanent display in a gallery designed for them. In 1975 Dia installed Untitled (In memory of Urs Graf) at Kunstmuseum Basel as its first permanent installation.

=== Drawing ===
Living in Wainscott and Garrison, Flavin often drew the surrounding landscape, whether it was the Hudson Valley or the waters off Long Island. He also created small portraits and kept about 20 volumes of journals. Flavin collected drawings too, including works by Hudson River School artists like John Frederick Kensett, Jasper Francis Cropsey, and Sanford Robinson Gifford, along with examples of works on paper by early-19th-century Japanese artists like Hokusai and 20th-century European masters like Piet Mondrian and George Grosz. Flavin also exchanged works with Minimalist colleagues like Donald Judd and Sol LeWitt.

== Exhibitions ==
Flavin's first one-person exhibition using only fluorescent light opened at the Green Gallery in 1964. Two years later, his first European show opened at Rudolf Zwirner's gallery in Cologne, Germany. Flavin's first major museum exhibition was held in 1967 at the Museum Of Contemporary Art, Chicago, where Jan van der Marck served as director. The first major retrospective of Flavin's work was organized by Brydon Smith at the National Gallery of Canada, Ottawa in 1969. In 1973, the Saint Louis Art Museum presented concurrent exhibitions of his works on paper and fluorescent sculptures. Among Flavin's many significant one-person exhibitions in Europe were shows at the Kunstmuseum Basel and Kunsthalle Basel (1975), the Staatliche Kunsthalle, Baden-Baden (1989), and the Städel, Frankfurt (1993).

His first solo exhibition in Latin America was held at Fundación Proa, Buenos Aires, in 1998, organized with the Dia Art Foundation (Dan Flavin. 1933-96).

In 2004, Dia Art Foundation, along with the National Gallery of Art, organised a comprehensive exhibition named Dan Flavin: A Retrospective at Dia Beacon (exhibited October 3, 2004 – August 12, 2007). It brought together more than 50 of Flavin's artworks. A catalog Dan Flavin: A Retrospective, by Michael Govan and Tiffany Bell, et al. was published by Yale University Press ISBN 978-0-300-10632-9.

=== Dan Flavin: A Retrospective (2004 – 2007) ===
In the late 1970s, he began a partnership with the Dia Art Foundation that resulted in the making of several permanent site-specific installations and led most recently to the organization of the traveling exhibition, Dan Flavin: A Retrospective (2004–2007). Flavin's retrospective exhibition traveled to the Museum of Contemporary Art, Chicago; the National Gallery of Art, Washington, D.C.; the Museum of Modern Art, Fort Worth, Texas; Hayward Gallery, London; Musée d'Art Moderne de la Ville de Paris, Paris; Bayerische Staatsgemäldesammlungen, Pinakothek der Moderne, Munich; and the Los Angeles County Museum of Art, Los Angeles. This exhibition was the first comprehensive retrospective devoted to his minimalist work. The exhibition included nearly 45 light works, including his "icons" series. The MCA's presentation included the re-creation of the alternating pink and "gold" room from the original MCA exhibition in 1967, Flavin's first solo museum exhibition.

== Recognition ==
In 1964, Flavin received an award from the William and Norma Copley Foundation, Chicago, with a recommendation from Marcel Duchamp. In 1973, he was named Albert Dorne Visiting Professor at the University of Bridgeport, Connecticut, and in 1976, he was given the Skowhegan Medal of Sculpture from Skowhegan School of Painting and Sculpture, Maine.

In 1983, the Dia Center for the Arts opened the Dan Flavin Art Institute in Bridgehampton, New York, a permanent exhibition of his works, designed by the artist in a converted firehouse which had served as an African-American church from 1924 through the mid-’70s. Flavin worked closely with architect Richard Gluckman and Jim Schaeufele, Dia's director of operations, on the renovation and design. Here, Flavin's works are exhibited in "rooms without windows or bearing an indirect relationship to its outside surroundings". The permanent display consists of nine all-fluorescent pieces, six in color and three dedicated to Schaeufele in three shades of white, as well as a drawing for an icon, not in the temporary exhibition, dedicated to his late twin brother, David John.

In the 2011 film Tower Heist, Flavin's estate sent an expert to oversee the construction of a Flavin light installation that was recreated on the set.

In 2017, gallerist Vito Schnabel announced a collaboration with Flavin's estate. Schnabel joined the artist's son, Stephen Flavin, to present Flavin's light sculptures alongside works by European ceramicists admired and collected by Flavin.

== Books about Flavin ==
In 2004, Ridinghouse and Thames & Hudson published It Is What It Is: Dan Flavin Since 1964, which contains key essays on Flavin and reviews of his exhibitions. It contains the writing of critics and historians such as Donald Judd, Dore Ashton, Rosalind Krauss, Lawrence Alloway, Germano Celant, Holland Cotter.

In 2010, artists Cindy Hinant and Nicolas Guagnini created the book FLAV, with primary archival texts and correspondence by and about Dan Flavin.

== Art market ==
Each of the more than 750 light sculptures that Dan Flavin designed - usually in editions of three or five - were listed on index cards and filed away. When one sold, the buyer received a certificate containing a diagram of the work, its title and the artist's signature and stamp. If someone showed up with a certificate and a damaged fixture, Flavin would replace it.

The highest price for one of his works in the art market was reached when Alternate Diagonals of March 2, 1964 (to Don Judd) (1964) sold at Sotheby's New York, on 14 May 2014, for $3,077,000.

== See also ==
- Santa Maria Annunciata in Chiesa Rossa in Milan, Italy, Flavin's final work.

== Bibliography ==
- It Is What It Is: Dan Flavin Since 1964, edited by Karsten Schubert and Paula Feldman. Ridinghouse in association with Thames & Hudson. 2004.
- Dan Flavin: The Complete Lights, 1961-1996 by Michael Govan and Tiffany Bell. Yale University Press, New Haven, CT. 2004.
- Dan Flavin: Lights, edited by Rainer Fuchs. Hatje Cantz Verlag, Ostfildern 2012. English ISBN 978-3-7757-3523-0.
