= Magazzini Bonomi =

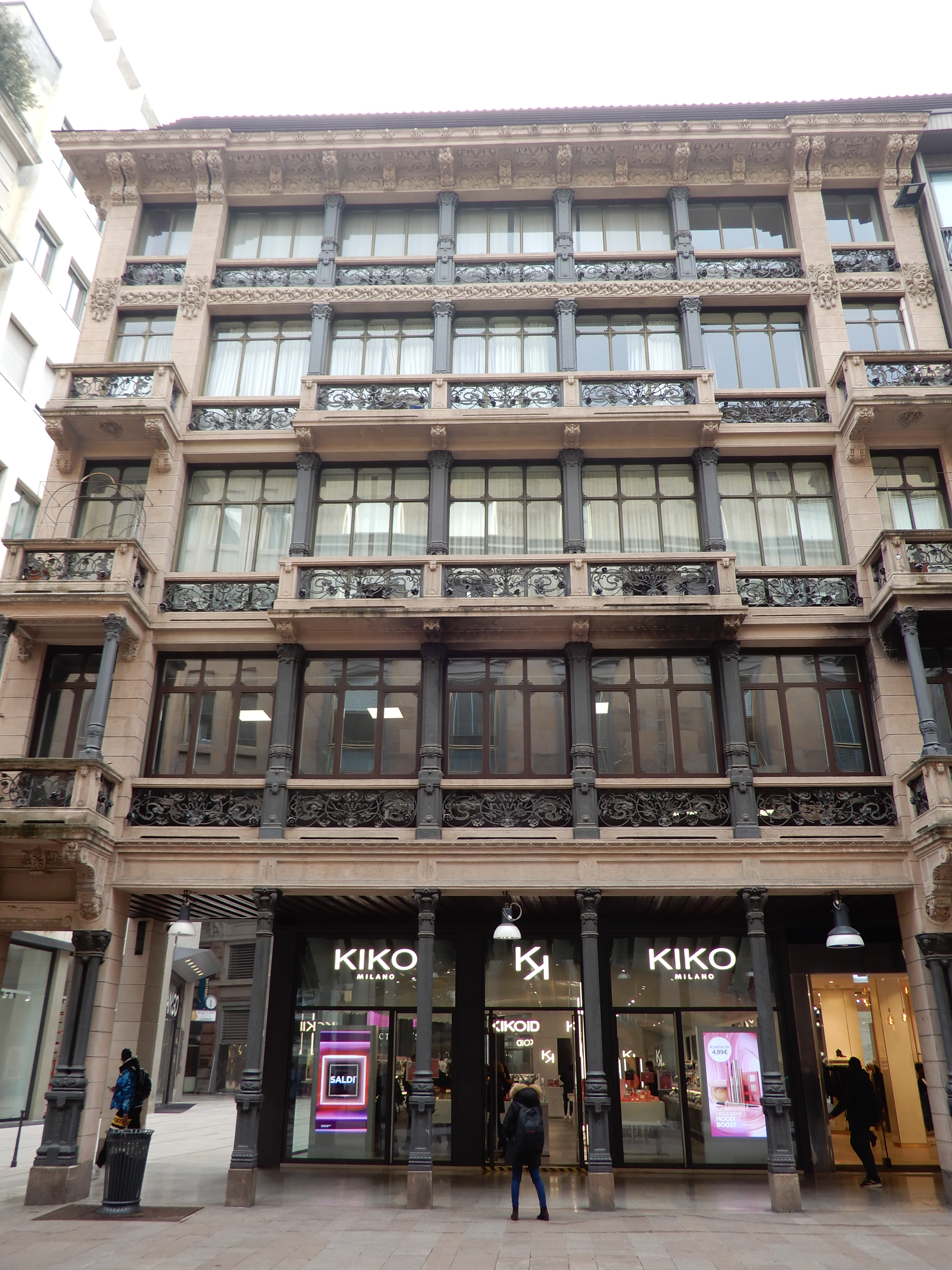
- Magazzini Bonomi in Milan
- Click on the map for a fullscreen view

General information
- Architectural style: Art Nouveau
- Location: Milan, Italy
- Coordinates: 45°27′54.05″N 9°11′37.89″E

The Magazzini Bonomi is a historic commercial building in Milan, Italy.

== History ==
The building was erected by Angelo Bonomi in 1906. It was later remodeled and incorporated into a larger structure by architect Giovanni Muzio between 1952 and 1965.

== Description ==
The building is located on Corso Vittorio Emanuele II in the centre of Milan. The Liberty style facade was from the building designed by Bonomi, which was heavily damaged during Allied bombardments in World War II. The main feature of the building is represented by its large windows, made possible through the use of modern techniques and materials. The load-bearing structure is made of cast iron, as can be seen in the pillars visible on the facade. Ornated railings and cornices, balconies and canopies make up the decorative ensemble.
