= Tempio della Vittoria, Milan =

Coordinates: 45°27′48″N 9°10′32″E

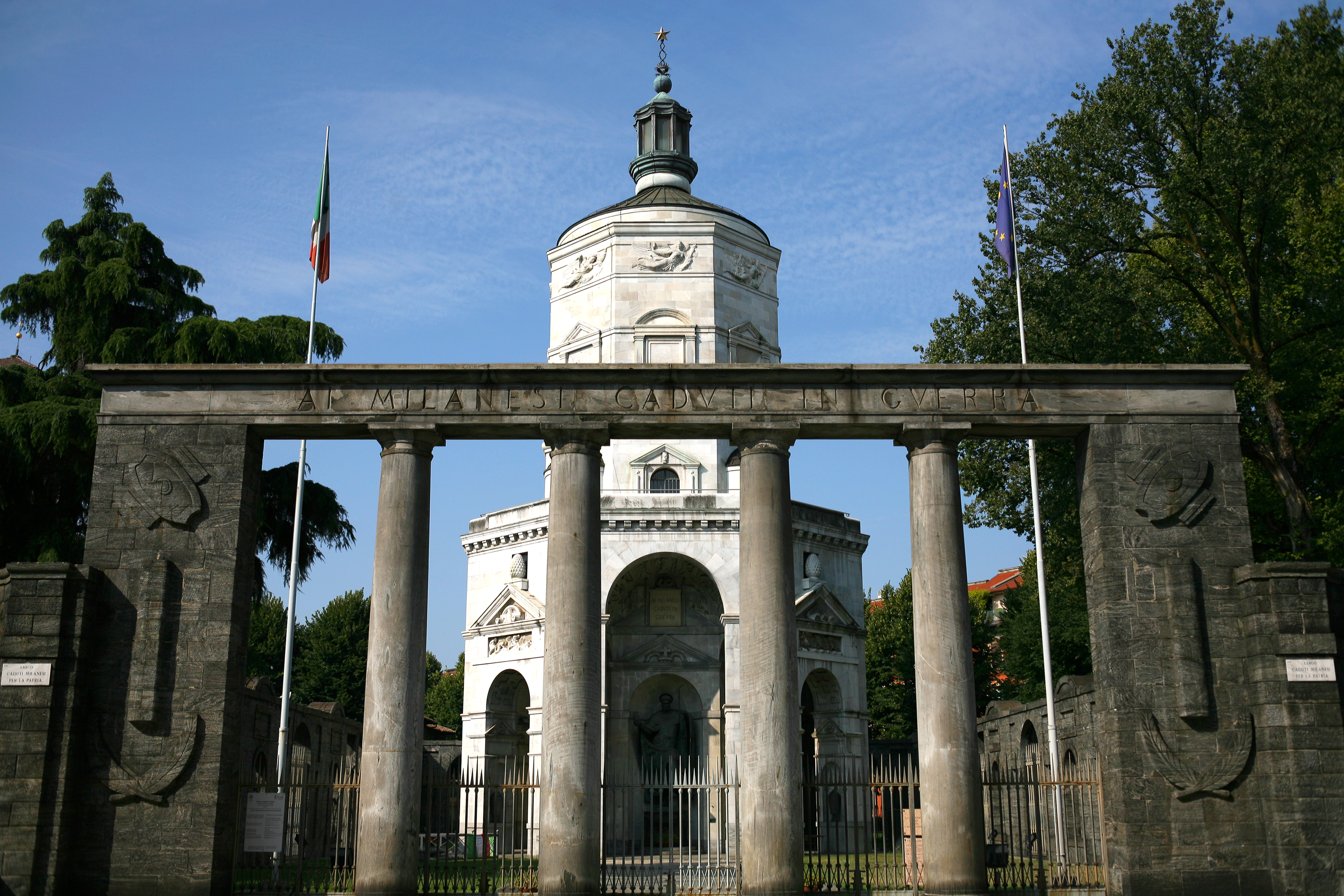
View of the shrine from the exterior with fasces in portal

The Tempio della Vittoria or Temple of the Victory, also called the Shrine of the Fallen (Soldiers) of Milan is a monumental war memorial chapel in Milan, Italy.

It is adjacent to the Basilica of Sant'Ambrogio and southwest of the Università Cattolica del Sacro Cuore.

== History and description ==
The monument was commissioned after World War I by the Associazioni Combattentistiche (veterans' associations) to honor the soldiers from Milan who had died in the war. The original proposals were for a monument without a shrine or cemetery in front of the train station. But a second plan was selected, for the site near Sant'Ambrogio which had been a previously associated with a cemetery of early Christian martyrs.

The project was mainly designed by the architect Giovanni Muzio working with Alberto Alpago-Novello, Tomaso Buzzi, Ottavio Cabiati, and Gio Ponti. The work began in 1927, and the shrine was inaugurated on 4 November 1928, on the tenth anniversary of the victory in World War I. The ceremony was led by Prince Emanuele Filiberto, Duke of Aosta, commander of the 3rd Army, who had been made Marshal of Italy in 1926.

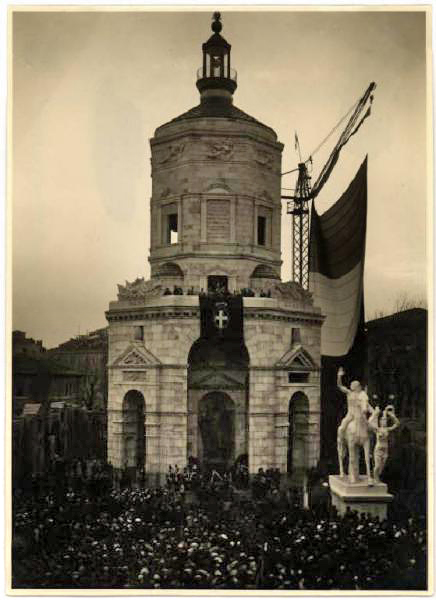
Inauguration of the shrine in 1928. Statues by Libero Andreotti on the right.

The white marble shrine is an octagon, sometimes described as a tower ringed with eight triumphal arches. The octagon was often used in Italy for shrines and baptistries, as opposed to the basilica layout for sacramental churches.

The arches represent the eight former gates of Milan through which soldiers left the city. The four main sides have reliefs depicting battles, each with a stone urn holding earth from the battlefield. The stone entrance wall is flanked by two fasces.

Inside the shrine, it was planned to place a secular bronze sculptural group of a horseman led by an allegorical Victory, both naked, by Libero Andreotti entitled the Return after the Victory; the stucco model of the statue was once outside the temple, but the bronze was never completed. While the sober architectural modelling of the shrine was praised, this sculptural group met much criticism: Orsini of the Sera newspaper commented: that "the horse distances itself, to its detriment, from the well-known classical patterns. The adjacent female victory would fall, despite its wings: it doesn't grab the bridle."

Facing the entrance gates is a four meter tall bronze statue, St Ambrose tramples the seven sins (1928) by Adolfo Wildt. The seven sins are represented by mice below his left foot.

The shrine was heavily damaged by the 1943 Allied bombardment. It was restored, and in 1973, three subterranean floors, containing an ossuary, were added under the direction of Mario Baccini, with bronze plaques listing the names of ten thousand soldiers and patriots who died in the two World Wars.
