= Thomas Jefferson Foundation =

American historical foundation

The Thomas Jefferson Foundation, originally known as the Thomas Jefferson Memorial Foundation, is a private, nonprofit 501(c)(3) corporation founded in 1923 to purchase and maintain Monticello, the primary plantation of Thomas Jefferson, the third president of the United States. The Foundation's initial focus was on architectural preservation, with the goal of restoring Monticello as close to its original appearance as possible. It has since grown to include other historic and cultural pursuits and programs such as its Annual Independence Day Celebration and Naturalization Ceremony. It also publishes and provides a center for scholarship on Jefferson and his era.

== History ==
The Thomas Jefferson Foundation was launched in 1923 as the Thomas Jefferson Memorial Foundation. It named Stuart G. Gibboney as its first president on April 28, 1923, shortly after the Foundation's inauguration earlier that month in New York City. The Foundation's constitution had two primary goals:

To purchase, preserve and maintain Monticello, at Charlottesville, in the State of Virginia, as a national memorial, so that it may be forever retained as a shrine, and reverently transmitted to future generations as a monument to the genius and patriotism of Thomas Jefferson, and a constant reminder of the principles inscribed in the Declaration of Independence. To foster and preserve the ideals of American liberty and the republican form of government; and to keep alive the name and memory of Thomas Jefferson, as the apostle of human freedom.

— Thomas Jefferson Memorial Foundation, Inc.

Monticello had a contract purchase price of $500,000, the first $100,000 of which the Foundation paid by December 1923 to the property's prior owner, Jefferson Monroe Levy. This initial payment was a landmark for the Foundation, as the transaction allowed it to assume the title to Monticello. The Foundation also sought to raise $500,000 for an endowment fund, which would be used to maintain Monticello and create plans that would "foster the ideals of Jefferson". In moving beyond the planning stages and taking physical possession of Monticello, the Foundation surpassed prior attempts by similar organizations and groups in the preceding half-century that never got beyond preliminary negotiations. The Washington Post noted that the Foundation's successful payment "has set to rest any misgivings that may have existed that the foundation's plan would end without result".

In 1909, Maud Littleton, the wife of Martin W. Littleton, visited Monticello. Following her visit, Littleton launched a nationwide antisemitic campaign to have Monticello expropriated from Jefferson Levy. Littleton took her campaign to the press as well as to Congress, with two bills to expropriate Monticello from Levy failing to pass. Littleton used veiled antisemitic remarks to disparage Levy, such as calling him an "alien", "oriental", and a "rank outsider" who had allegedly altered the character of "the house that Jefferson built and made sacred." Littleton also made attempts to purchase Monticello. Angered by Littleton's antisemitism, Levy refused to sell his property. However, due to strained finances, Levy reluctantly sold Monticello to a foundation. Maud Littleton became the organization's first executive director. For the next 60 years, mention of the Levy family was erased by the foundation, despite the fact that they were responsible for saving the house and Levy's mother Rachel is buried at Monticello. Neglected for decades, Rachel's grave was refurbished in 1985, under the foundation's new executive director Daniel Jordan.

The Foundation was officially launched at the University of Virginia, which Jefferson founded. During 1924 the Foundation opened Monticello to the general public and began repair and maintenance work on the property, which had fallen into disrepair. That same year architectural historian Fiske Kimball was named as the Chairman of the Restoration Committee and would serve in a leading role in Monticello's restoration until his death. In the following year the National Education Committee was formed to "promote restoration of Monticello and to spread Jeffersonian ideals".

In the immediate years following its launch the Foundation became active in various historic pursuits and in 1929 elected Thomas Edison as the first "Nation's Guest of Honor" in recognition of his service in "science, art, education, literature, or government." A year later this recognition went to Rear Admiral Richard E. Byrd.

The Foundation paid off its first mortgage in 1928. Although it experienced financial hardship during the Great Depression, the Foundation was officially debt free by 1940. In 1960 it moved its headquarters from New York to Monticello, where it has remained. Two years later the Foundation launched its Annual Independence Day Celebration and Naturalization Ceremony, which is still held today and is considered to be the "oldest continuous naturalization ceremony held outside of a courtroom in the United States". During January 2000 the Thomas Jefferson Memorial Foundation changed its name to the Thomas Jefferson Foundation.

=== Restoration of Monticello ===
Efforts to restore Monticello began shortly after the Foundation's purchase, and in 1924 work began on the main house's supporting stone walls. The terraces and roof were also repaired and the house was repainted. The Foundation also began restoring Monticello's gardens and invited the Garden Club of America (GCA) to give advice. The GCA would later assist with funding for the restoration of the Kitchen Road, which leads from the main house to Mulberry Row.

In 1927 Monticello's Great Clock was repaired and during the following year the foundation restored the slave quarters under the south terrace. In the following years the Foundation restored more of the plantation as closely to its original state as possible. It has bought additional land that formerly belonged or pertained to Jefferson, including the Shadwell plantation where the President was born (purchased in 1963), one of his original farms, Tufton (purchased in 1968), and Montalto (acquired in 2004). The Foundation now owns roughly 2,500 acres of Jefferson's original 5,000-acre estate at Monticello, of which it has put 1,060 acres under permanent preservation easements.

In 1987 Monticello, along with the University of Virginia, were jointly inscribed on UNESCO's World Heritage List in recognition of their "outstanding universal value." This marks Monticello as the only presidential home in America on the World Heritage List.

== Awards and recognition programs ==
The Thomas Jefferson Foundation has overseen several contests and awards programs, most notably the Thomas Jefferson Foundation Medals, which are granted jointly with the University of Virginia. These medals are given out in recognition of distinguished contributions in the fields of Architecture, Law, Citizen Leadership, and Global Innovation and are the highest honor granted by the University of Virginia, which does not bestow honorary degrees.

- The Thomas Jefferson Foundation Medal in Architecture is given jointly by the Foundation and the University of Virginia School of Architecture
- Thomas Jefferson Foundation Medal in Law is given jointly by the Foundation and the University of Virginia School of Law
- Thomas Jefferson Foundation Medal in Citizen Leadership is given jointly by the Foundation and the University of Virginia
- Thomas Jefferson Foundation Medal in Global Innovation

The first Thomas Jefferson Medal was awarded for the field of architecture to Mies van der Rohe in 1966. The Foundation and the University of Virginia began awarding medals for law in 1977, followed by medals in Citizen Leadership in 2007 and Global Innovation in 2016.

Other recipients of the award include federal judge John Gleeson (Law, 2016), Jaime Lerner (Architecture, 1997), Joseph Neubauer (Citizen Leadership, 2010), and Gordon Moore (Global Innovation, 2016).

== Exhibits and other work ==
The Foundation has coordinated with several institutions for exhibits that focus on the history of Thomas Jefferson and Monticello. In 2012 the Foundation partnered with the National Museum of African American History and Culture for the exhibit "Jefferson and Slavery at Monticello: Paradox of Liberty", which was hosted at the Smithsonian's National Museum of American History. The following year the exhibit was shown in Atlanta, St. Louis, and Philadelphia under the title "Slavery at Jefferson's Monticello: How the Word Is Passed Down."

=== Slavery at Monticello: Life and Work at Mulberry Row ===
During 2012 the Foundation launched "Slavery at Monticello: Life and Work at Mulberry Row", a tour that examined the titular Mulberry Row, a plantation path that served as the "dynamic, industrial hub of Jefferson's 5,000-acre agricultural enterprise". Three years later the Foundation, along with developer Bluecadet Interactive, released an app by the same name for mobile devices. The app received a review from Common Sense Media and was an honoree at the 2016 Webby Awards in the field of Mobile Sites & Apps, Education & Reference.

In 2013 the Foundation received a $10 million (~$13.2 million in 2024) gift from David Rubenstein, part of which it used to reconstruct slave quarters on Mulberry Row. It is also working on the Getting Word oral history project, which was launched to "preserve the histories of the African American families at Thomas Jefferson's Virginia plantation" by interviewing their descendants.

=== The Papers of Thomas Jefferson ===
In 1998 the Foundation was approached by Princeton University to assist with The Papers of Thomas Jefferson, a project aimed at publishing the complete public and private papers of Thomas Jefferson. The Foundation assumed the responsibility for the Retirement Series, which covers papers composed or received by Jefferson beginning at the end of his presidency on 4 March 1809 and concluding with his death on 4 July 1826. In 2004 the Retirement Series launched a second project, Jefferson Quotes & Family Letters, a freely accessible collection of digital correspondence by, to, and between members of Jefferson's extensive family, excluding those to and from Jefferson himself, and accounts of the early years of the University of Virginia.

=== Digital Archaeological Archive of Comparative Slavery ===
In 2000 the Thomas Jefferson Foundation, specifically the department of Archaeology of Monticello, launched the Digital Archaeological Archive of Comparative Slavery (DAACS), an ongoing Internet-based research and archival initiative. The goal of DAACS is to advance the historical understanding of slavery and slave-based society in the United States and the Caribbean in the time before the American Civil War. The project's goals include cultivating collaboration between scholars of multiple disciplines and the sharing and open access of American slavery-related archaeological data.

=== Publications ===
The Foundation has published multiple works that focus on the history of Thomas Jefferson, Monticello, and slavery at the plantation. Its first publication, a series of six small books called the Monticello Papers, appeared between 1923 and 1936. Other published works include A Passion for Nature: Thomas Jefferson and Natural History, Jefferson and Science, Jefferson and Monroe: Constant Friendship and Respect, and Letters from the Head and Heart: Writings of Thomas Jefferson.

== Centers ==
=== Robert H. Smith International Center for Jefferson Studies ===
The Robert H. Smith International Center for Jefferson Studies (ICJS), the scholarly hub of the Thomas Jefferson Foundation, is intended to "foster Thomas Jefferson scholarship and disseminate findings through research and education". Founded in 1994 as the International Center for Jefferson Studies, the name was changed when Robert H. Smith endowed the Center in 2004. The ICJS hosts fellowships, international scholarly conferences, courses and seminars, and internships and also issues Jefferson-related publications.

The ICJS is made up of several departments which are individually responsible for the Jefferson Library, archaeology, research, publications, adult enrichment, and the editorial department of The Papers of Thomas Jefferson: Retirement Series.

=== Thomas Jefferson Center for Historic Plants ===
The Thomas Jefferson Center for Historic Plants was established in 1986 and is concerned with the collection, preservation, and distribution of historic plant varieties and the study of their origins and evolution. It covers not only plants that were grown at Monticello, but also plants that were cultivated elsewhere in America.

== See also ==
- Gardens of Monticello
- Monticello Association
