= Tracy Harris =

American artist

- Born: August 24, 1958; Lawton, Oklahoma
- Education: Southern Methodist University
- Spouse: Dan Flavin 1992-1996 (his death) Lucian K. Truscott IV 2021- present

Tracy Harris (born 1958) is an American artist, known for her abstract, encaustic paintings. Tracy Harris lives in Milford, Pennsylvania.

== Biography ==
Tracy Harris was born in 1958 in Lawton, Oklahoma, and she grew up in Dallas, Texas until age 10. Her parents are Janene Harris and architect, Hayes Harris. After age 10, the family moved a lot after her father took a civilian architect role with the United States Army and Air Force, they lived in Honolulu, Guam, Manila, and Thailand.

She attended Southern Methodist University, receiving a BFA degree and MFA degree in 1983. After college she worked at the Dallas Museum of Art and taught painting classes.

It was through her work at the Dallas museum she was connected by a mutual friend to minimalist artist Dan Flavin, initially as a penpal and later as long-distance dating. She married Dan Flavin in 1992 at the Solomon R. Guggenheim Museum. Harris later lived between Long Island, New York and Greenwich, Connecticut after the marriage. Four years after the marriage, Flavin died from complications from his diabetes.

Her artwork is in a number of museum collections, including Museum of Fine Arts, Houston, Telfair Museum, Savannah, the Amarillo Museum of Art, among others.
