= Santa Maria Annunciata in Chiesa Rossa =

Church building in Milan, Italy

Coordinates: 45°25′58″N 9°10′41″E

Santa Maria Annunciata in Chiesa Rossa is a church in Milan, via Neera 24.

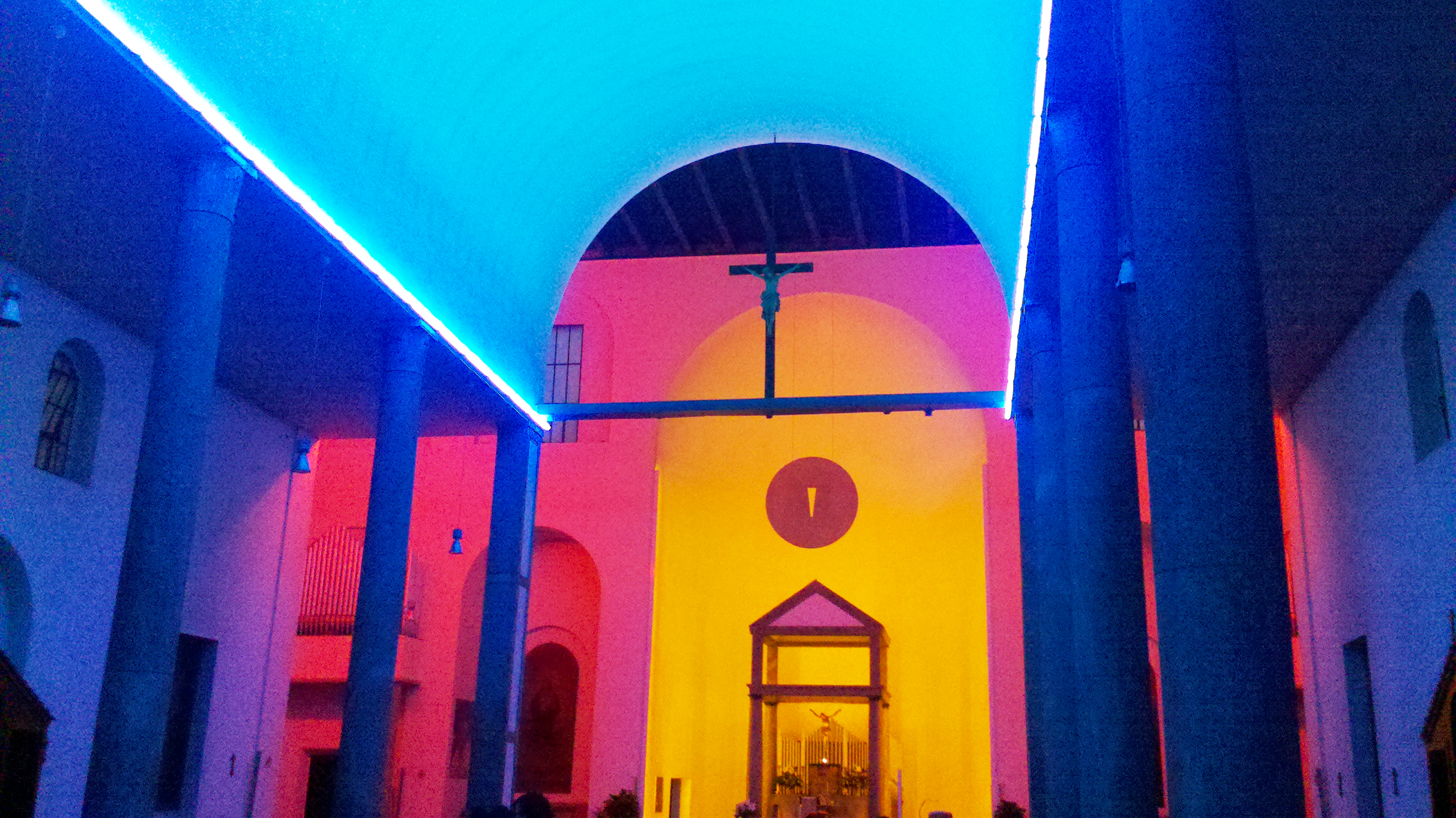
Interior with art Fluorescent tubes by Dan Flavin.

== History ==
The name "Chiesa Rossa" derived from the old church of "Santa Maria" near the "Naviglio Pavese" canal called also "Santa Maria ad Fonticulum".

The construction started by Franco Della Porta in Romanesque Revival style, and was completed in 1932 by Giovanni Muzio. The facade was built in the 1960.

A consecration plaque near main entrance remembers the church was consecrated on December 21, 1932 by Cardinal Alfredo Ildefonso Schuster, Archbishop of Milan .

== General description ==
Muzio has designed the church in plan as Latin cross, the central nave is covered by barrel vault and ends in the apse. The baptistery, in the left in a lateral chapel, has an octagonal shape and contains San Giovannino a sculpture by Giacomo Manzù.

From 1996, the church hosts Untitled, the last installation of Dan Flavin. The design was completed two days before Flavin's death on November 26, 1996 and installed a year later.

The installation is made with green and blue fluorescent lights for the main nave, red in the transept and yellow for the apse.

== Gallery ==
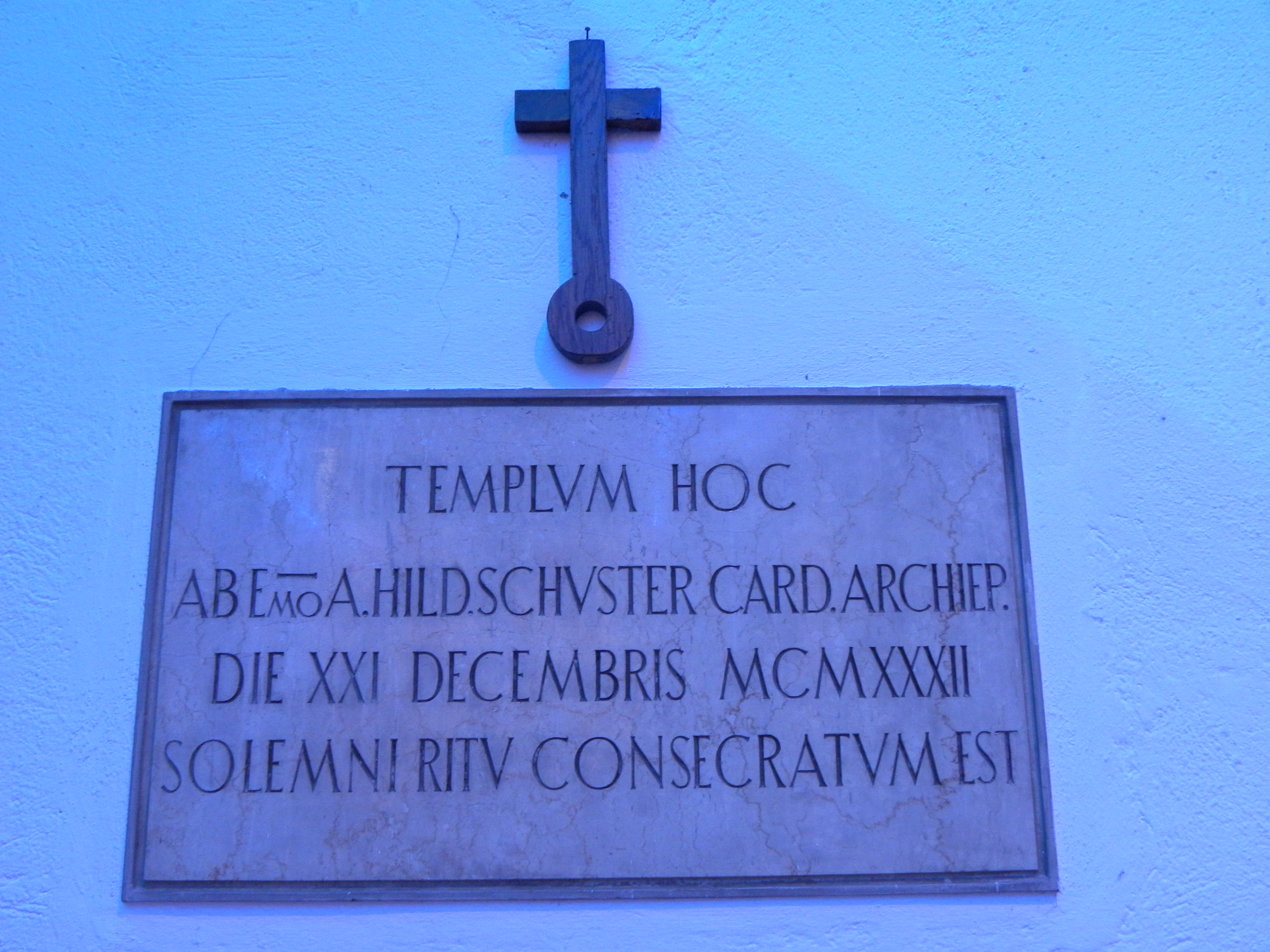
Consecration Plaque

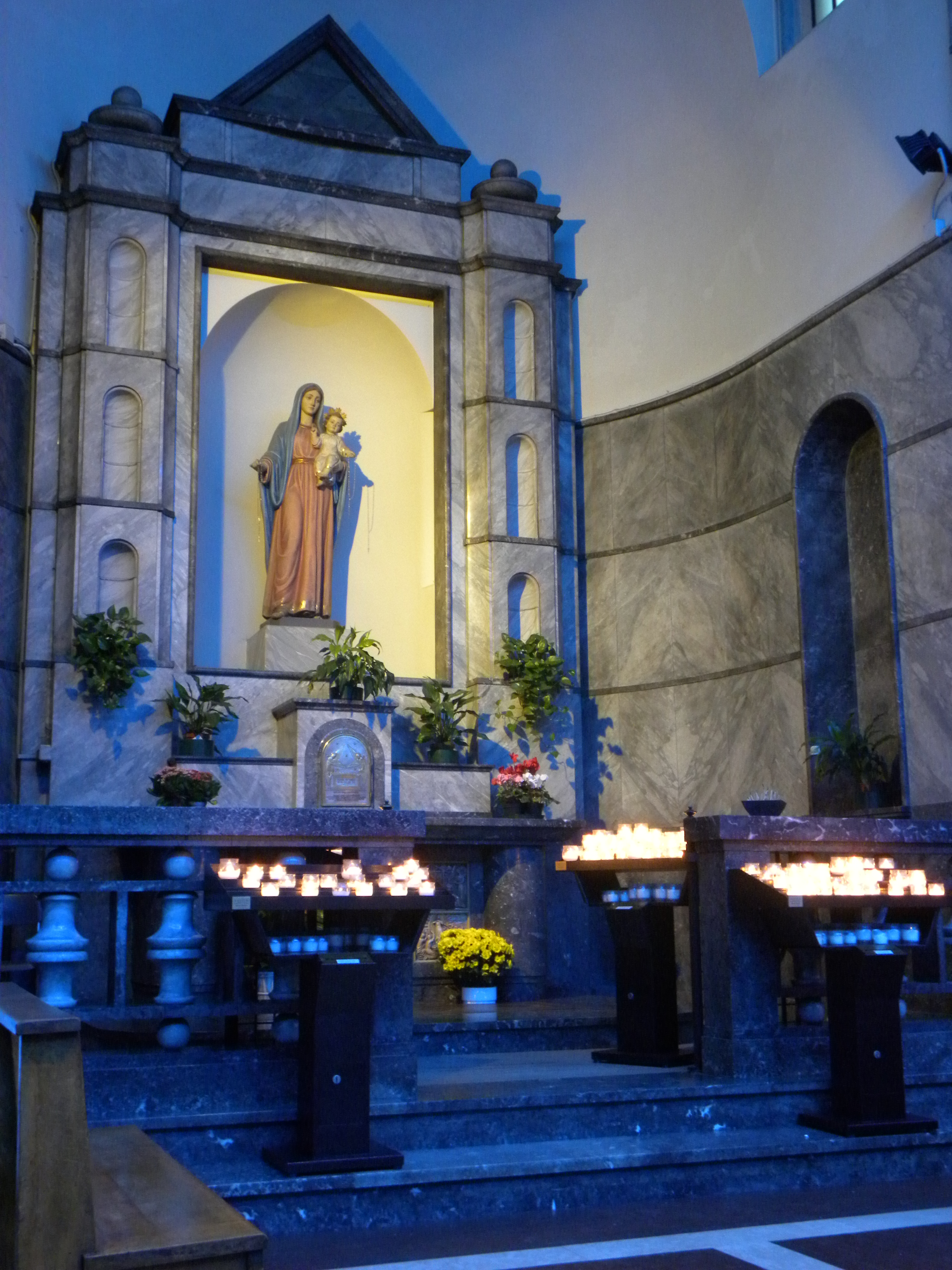
Altar of Our Lady in the left side of the church
