= Lucian K. Truscott IV =

American journalist (born 1947)

- Born: April 11, 1947 (age 79); Japan
- Occupations: Novelist, journalist
- Spouse(s): Tracy Harris (2021-present); Carolyn (1987–2013); Carol Troy (1979–1981)
- Children: Lilly, Lucian V, Violet

Lucian King Truscott IV (born April 11, 1947) is an American writer and journalist. A former staff writer for The Village Voice, he is the author of several military-themed novels including Dress Gray, which was adapted into a 1986 television film of the same name.

== Life ==
Truscott was born in Japan to Anne (née Harloe) and Lucian K. Truscott III, a U.S. Army colonel. His grandfather Lucian Truscott Jr. was a U.S. Army general during World War II, during which he commanded the 3rd Infantry Division and later the Fifth Army in Italy. His father Lucian Truscott III served in the U.S. Army in Korea and Vietnam, retiring as a colonel.

Truscott attended the United States Military Academy, graduating in 1969. In 1968, Truscott and other cadets challenged the required attendance at chapel services. Later, a court case filed by another cadet along with midshipmen at the United States Naval Academy resulted in a 1972 US Court of Appeals decision (upheld by the Supreme Court) that ended mandatory chapel attendance at all the service academies. He was then assigned to Fort Carson, Colorado. There, he wrote an article about heroin addiction among enlisted soldiers and another about what he felt was an illegal court martial. He was threatened with being sent to Vietnam, about thirteen months after graduating, received an other than honorable discharge

Truscott is a member of the Monticello Association, the members of which descend from Thomas Jefferson, who was Truscott's sixth-great-grandfather. The association owns the graveyard at Monticello. During a November 1998 appearance on the Oprah Winfrey Show he invited descendants of Sally Hemings to the family reunion in 2000. The Hemings descendants had not been allowed to join the association, nor to be buried in its graveyard.

Truscott lives in rural Pennsylvania with his wife, the artist Tracy Harris. He has three children: Lilly Truscott, Lucian K. Truscott V, and Violet Truscott.

== Journalism ==
Starting in 1970, Truscott joined The Village Voice as a freelancer and later staff writer. He had previously written for the Voice as a cadet, submitting "conservative, right-wing letters" that the newspaper eventually started to publish. One such letter, describing Christmas 1968 among the hippies at the Electric Circus nightclub, was published as a front-page story. Another piece, written a few weeks after Truscott graduated from West Point, described the riot at the Stonewall Inn on June 27, 1969. At present, Truscott writes a daily online column for his newsletter on Substack.

== Novels ==
Truscott's first novel, Dress Gray, was about a gay West Point cadet who was found dead. It was a bestseller, appearing thirteen weeks on The New York Times hardcover bestseller list and seven weeks on the paperback list. In The New York Times, Gene Lyons wrote the book was "as compelling and important a popular novel has emerged or is likely to emerge from the Vietnam era". It was made into a two-part television movie in 1986, starring Hal Holbrook, Eddie Albert, and Alec Baldwin; Gore Vidal wrote the screenplay.

The movie rights for his fourth novel, Heart of War, were sold for $1 million.

His fifth novel, Full Dress Gray, was a sequel to his first. The earlier book received a cool reception from West Point, while for the sequel, the campus bookstore scheduled Truscott for two book signings. Library Journal's review of the book described it as "a thoroughly satisfying mystery story with an uncommon setting." Booklist said that it was "a basic police procedural" but predicted the book would be "popular for its realistic dialogue couched in military protocol, which reflects the author's own past as a cadet."

== Books published ==
- The Complete Van Book (1977) — ISBN 978-0517527900
- Dress Gray (1979) — ISBN 978-0451190475
- Army Blue (1989) — ISBN 978-0517573846
- Rules of the Road (1990) — ISBN 978-1937957919
- Heart of War (1997) — ISBN 978-0451187703
- Full Dress Gray (1998) — ISBN 978-1937957650
