= Dress Gray =

1986 American television miniseries

- DVD cover
- Genre: Crime; Drama
- Based on: Dress Gray by Lucian Truscott IV
- Written by: Gore Vidal
- Directed by: Glenn Jordan
- Starring: Alec Baldwin; Lloyd Bridges; Hal Holbrook; Eddie Albert
- Theme music composer: Billy Goldenberg
- Country of origin: United States
- Original language: English
- No. of episodes: 2

Production
- Executive producer: Frank von Zerneck
- Producers: Glenn Jordan; William Beaudine Jr.
- Production locations: New Mexico Military Institute - 101 W. College Boulevard, Roswell, New Mexico; Stage 25, Warner Brothers Burbank Studios - 4000 Warner Boulevard, Burbank, California; Stage 27A, Warner Brothers Burbank Studios - 4000 Warner Boulevard, Burbank, California
- Cinematography: Gayne Rescher
- Editors: Paul Rubell; David A. Simmons
- Running time: 192 minutes
- Production company: Warner Bros. Television

Original release
- Network: NBC
- Release: March 9 – March 10, 1986

Dress Gray is a 1986 American television miniseries starring Alec Baldwin, Lloyd Bridges and Hal Holbrook. The program, about a cadet at a West Point-like military academy who investigates the murder of a fellow cadet, was adapted for the screen by Gore Vidal from the novel of the same name by Lucian Truscott IV. Dress Gray originally aired March 9–10, 1986 on NBC.

== Plot ==
Dress Gray is set during the era of the Vietnam War. A new class of cadets arrives at the Ulysses S. Grant Military Academy for its 100th anniversary. Ten months later one of those new cadets, David Hand (Patrick Cassidy), is found dead, apparently drowned despite being a top swimmer. Following an autopsy, academy physician Major Consor (Ron Rifkin) informs the investigating officer, Colonel King (Lane Smith), that Hand was murdered and possibly raped. With the school under public scrutiny in the wake of recent drug and cheating scandals, the commandant, Brigadier General Charles Hedges (Hal Holbrook), initiates a cover-up. Upper classman Rysam Slaight (Alec Baldwin) learns of the cover-up and soon finds himself not only the prime suspect in Hand's murder but also the target of a false honor code violation accusation as well as an independent investigation implemented by Judge Hand (Eddie Albert), Cadet Hand's wealthy and powerful father.

As Slaight seeks to clear his name, he learns that the manipulative Hand was gay and in love with him, a fact David revealed to his sister Elizabeth (Susan Hess), whom Slaight used to date. Elizabeth and Ry rekindle their romance and work together to solve David's murder. They discover that a USGA cadet had visited David's high school on a recruiting trip. David got the cadet drunk, took him to a hotel and took sexual advantage of him.

General Hedges threatens to have Slaight charged with murder, but Slaight counters that he will have the general charged with obstruction of justice. Stymied, the General induces a member of the academy's Honor Court to file a charge of lying against Slaight.

Elizabeth visits the hotel where David took the cadet and the manager signs an affidavit identifying the cadet from his photograph. Over her father's objections, Elizabeth has the affidavit delivered to Ry, who is before the Court. Slaight identifies Cadet Winant as the man who was with David in the hotel and who later raped and killed him.

Slaight is cleared by the Honor Court and reports to Elizabeth that Winant will be locked in a mental institution for a year or two. General Hedges tenders his resignation as Commandant of Students. Slaight plans to resign from the academy but following a talk with Superintendent Axel Rylander (Lloyd Bridges) decides to stay and graduate.

== Cast ==
- Eddie Albert as Judge Hand
- Alec Baldwin as Rysam 'Ry' Slaight
- Lloyd Bridges as Major General Axel Rylander, Superintendent, USGA
- Patrick Cassidy as David Hand
- Susan Hess as Elizabeth Hand
- Hal Holbrook as Gen. Charles Hedges
- Alexis Smith as Mrs. Iris Rylander
- Lane Smith as Col. King
- James Sikking as Capt. Clifford Bassett
- Albert Salmi as Sgt. Oliphant
- Ron Rifkin as Maj. Consor
- Timothy Van Patten as Lugar
- Cameron Dye as Buck
- Peter Nelson as Barnes
- Louise Latham as Mrs. Loerna Tutwiler
- Jason Beghe as Hank Beaumont
- Gary Kasper as Cullinan
- Joseph Kell as Winant

== Production ==
Truscott, who attended West Point, reportedly based Dress Gray on fact. The project was first adapted by Vidal in 1979 as a planned theatrical film, with Herbert Ross attached to direct. Ultimately Glenn Jordan, who also produced, directed the series. The project filmed on location at the New Mexico Military Institute in Roswell.

== Critical and popular response ==
Writing for The New York Times, John J. O'Connor described Dress Gray as "absorbing, but...never quite as powerful as it clearly intends". He questioned the casting of Holbrook and Albert while singling out Baldwin, Hess, Cassidy and Bridges for particular praise.

While perceiving some weaknesses in the overall story, the Chicago Tribune found that Dress Gray was "entertaining and a cut above most mini-series" although declaring Baldwin to be not a strong enough actor to carry off the heroics required of the lead role.

The Orlando Sentinel sharply criticized Vidal's script, calling the program "turbid" and "unpleasant" in large measure because of Vidal's "wooden, often inscrutable dialogue that makes some fine actors...look silly".

Part one of the miniseries finished 24th for the week in the Nielsen ratings.

== Awards and nominations ==
Dress Gray was nominated for three Emmy Awards: Outstanding Miniseries; Outstanding Writing in a Miniseries or Special; and Outstanding Achievement in Costuming For a Miniseries or Special.

== See also ==
- List of dramatic television series with LGBT characters
