= Giovanni Muzio =

Italian architect

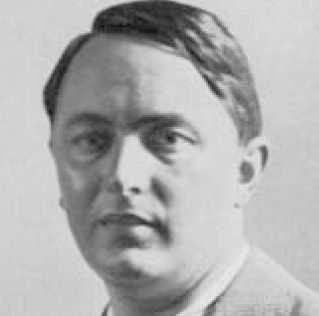
- Giovanni Muzio
- Born: 12 February 1893; Milan, Italy
- Died: 21 May 1982 (aged 89); Milan, Italy
- Education: Politecnico di Milano
- Occupation: Architect
- Projects: Basilica of the Annunciation

Giovanni Muzio (12 February 1893 – 21 May 1982) was an Italian architect. Muzio was born and died in Milan. He was closely associated with the Novecento Italiano artists group.

== Biography ==
The son of Virginio Muzio, an accomplished architect, Muzio studied in Milan, and after participation in the war and a trip to Europe, in 1920 he opened a studio on Via Santa Ursula in Milan, along with Giuseppe De Finetti, Gio Ponti, Emilio Lancia and Mino Fiocchi and actively participated in the cultural life of Milan.

After service in World War I Muzio began his practice in 1920 and is responsible for the best-known work of the Novecento movement, the 1922 residential block called the Ca' Brutta ("Ugly House") on the Via Moscova in Milan. The style is a stripped-down neo-classicism, simplifying classical decoration. The five story apartment building was erected on a rounded corner patterned with real and blind arches, empty niches, and varying bands of horizontal color.

With Gio Ponti and the artist Mario Sironi, Muzio designed the Popolo d'Italia pavilion for the 1928 Milan Trade fair, the Italian pavilion for the 1928 Pressa Exhibition in Cologne and the exhibition buildings for the 1930 Triennale exhibition. Other buildings include the Milan Tennis Club (1923–1929); the Banca Bergamasca (1924–1927); the former-Palazzo del Popolo d'Italia (1938-1942), now Palazzo dell'Informazione or dei Giornali in Piazza Cavour of Milan; and the Santa Maria Annunciata in Chiesa Rossa (1932) in Milan. In 1927-29, collaborating with Alberto Alpago Novello, Tomaso Buzzi, Ottavio Cabiati, and Gio Ponti, Muzio designed the shrine for those fallen in the World War, the Tempio della Vittoria adjacent to the Basilica Sant'Ambrogio.

A notable project by Muzio is the design of the Basilica of the Annunciation in Nazareth, completely rebuilt between 1960 and 1969. In 1960 he built the Edificio Beni Immobili at the corner of Vittorio Emmanuele and Via privata della Passarella in Milan, incorporating the Art Nouveau facade of the Magazzini Bonomi. This building had been severely damaged by World War II bombings.

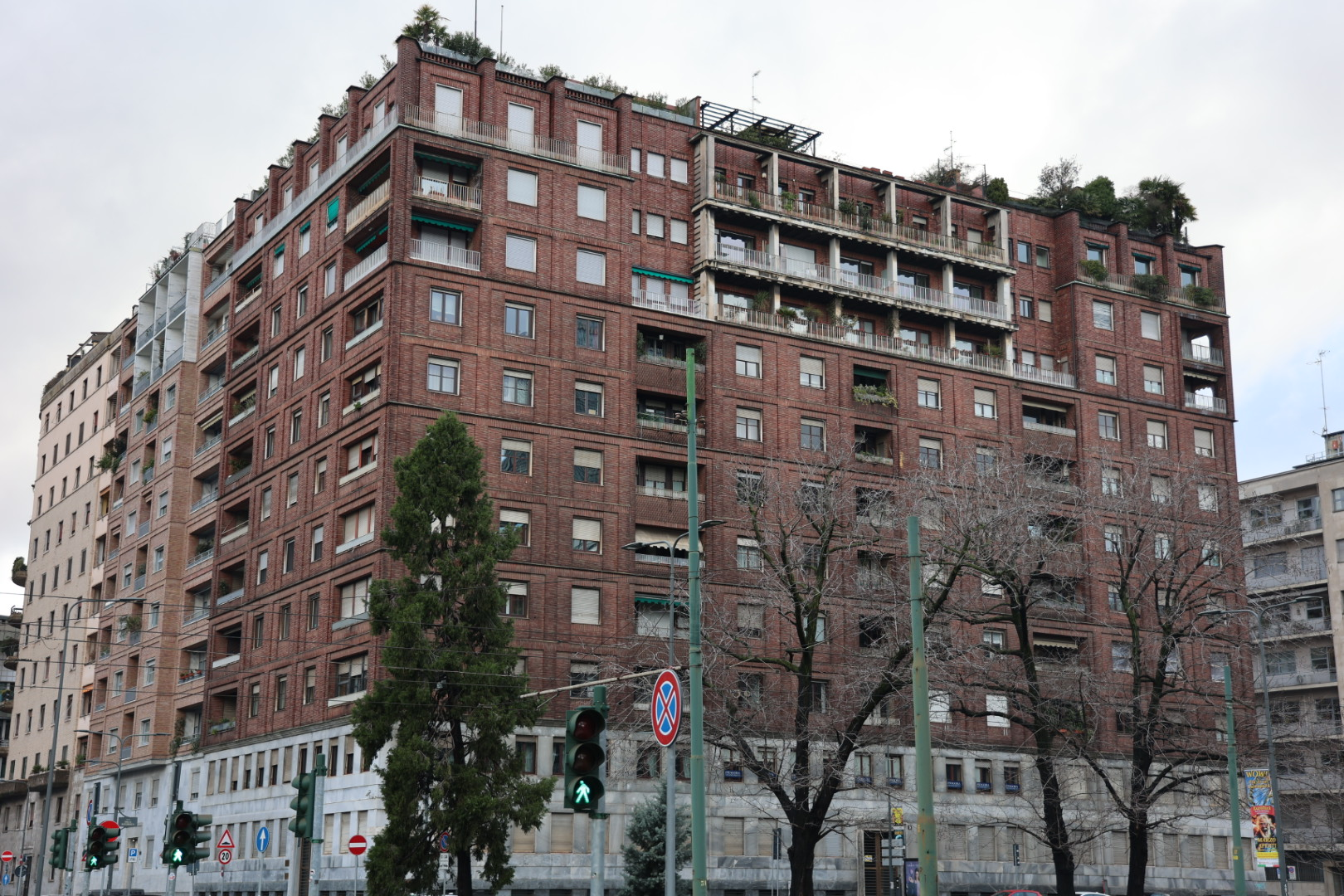
Residential apartment complex of Case Banaiti Malugani

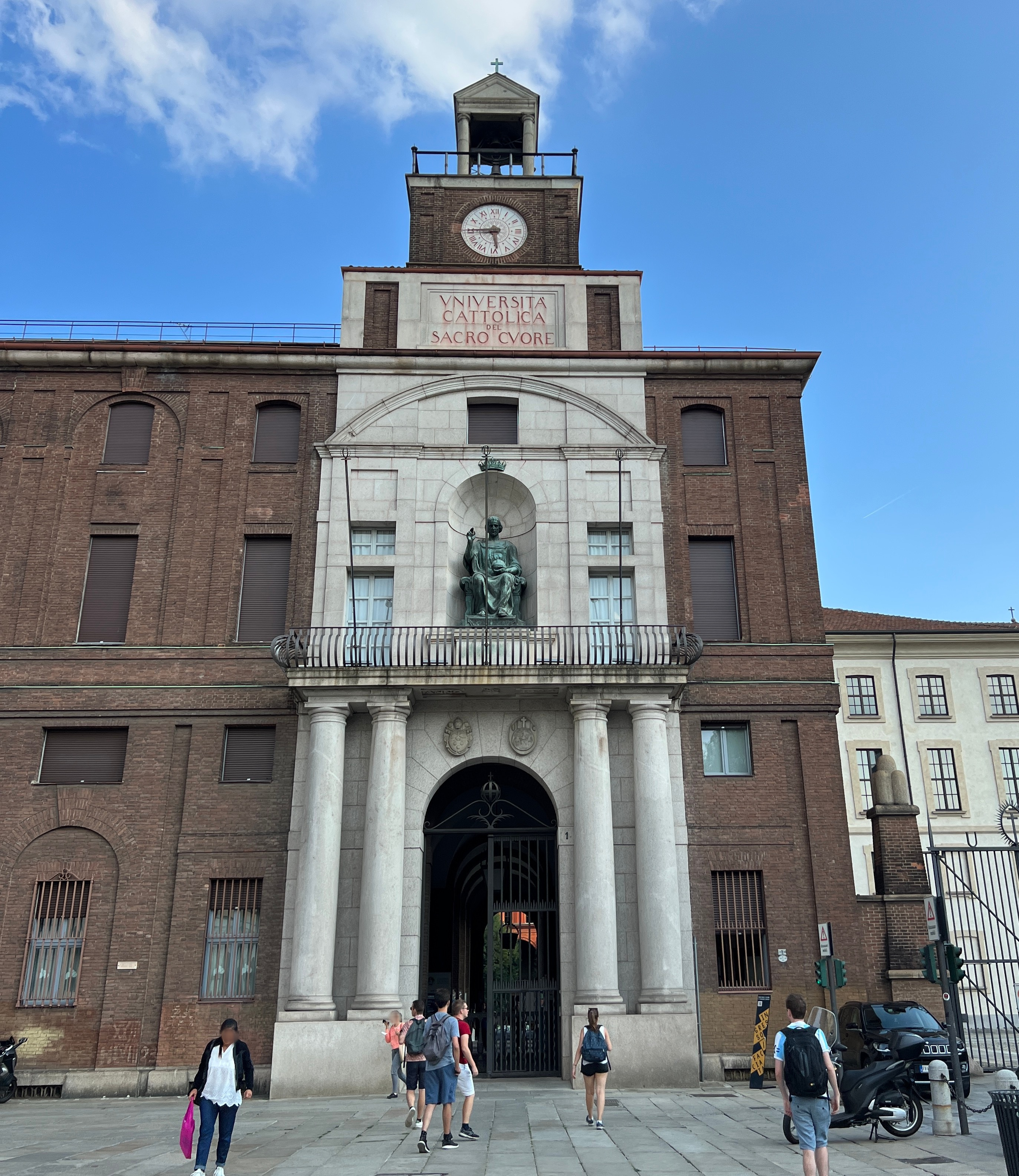
Main entrance to University of Sacro Cuore in Milan

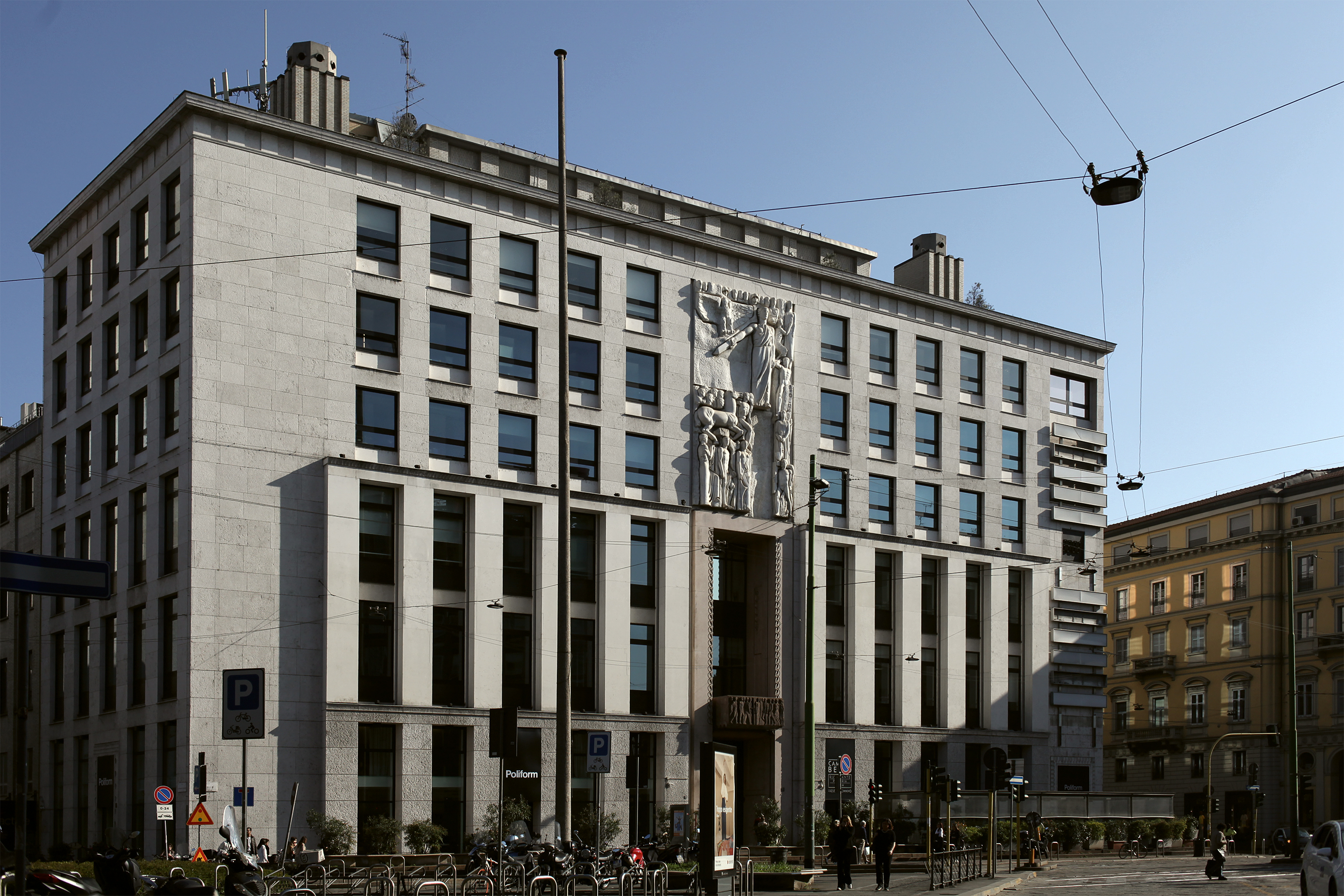
Palazzo dell'Informazione

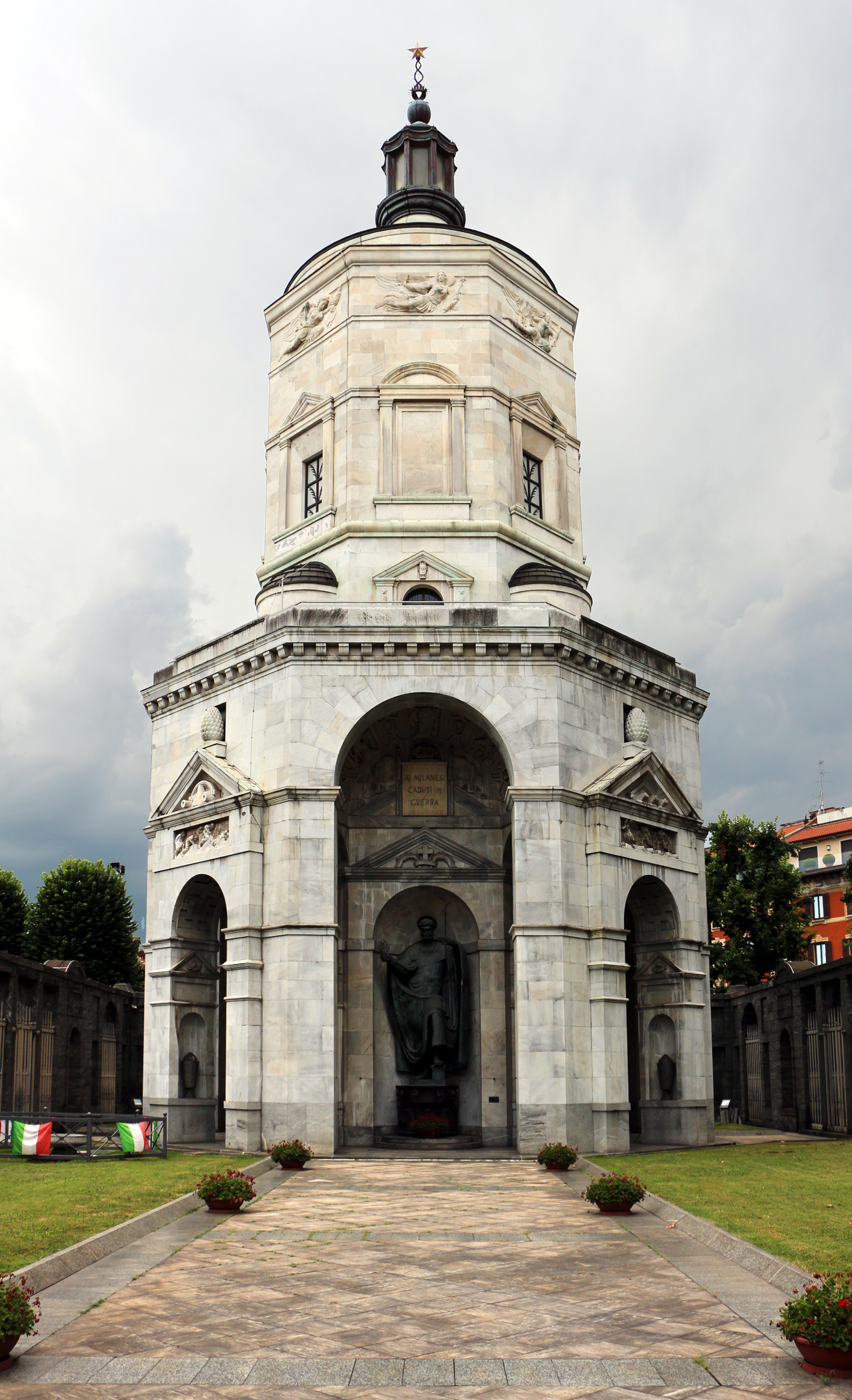
Tempio della Vittoria, Milan, inaugurated 1928

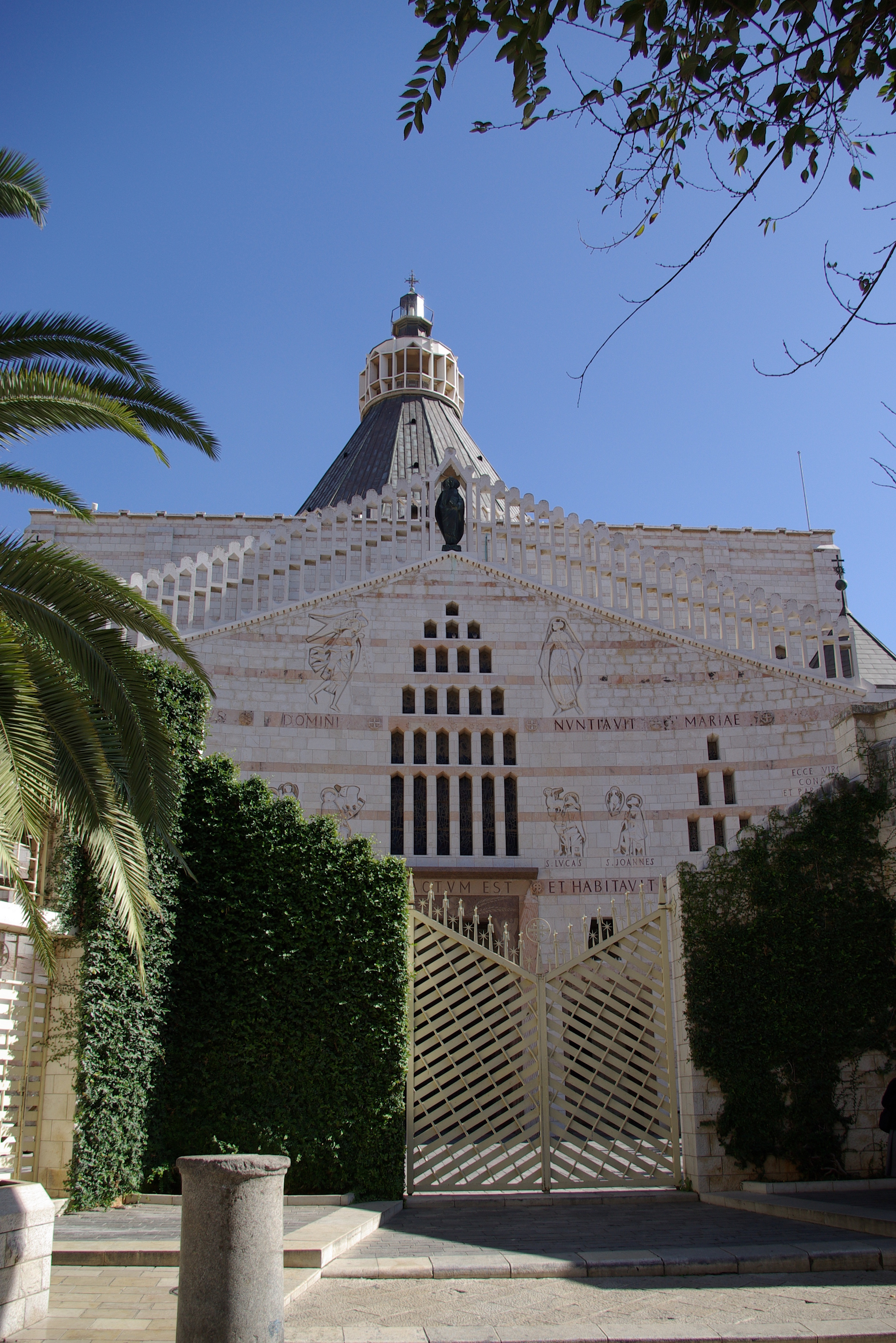
Basilica of the Annunciation in Nazareth, Israel

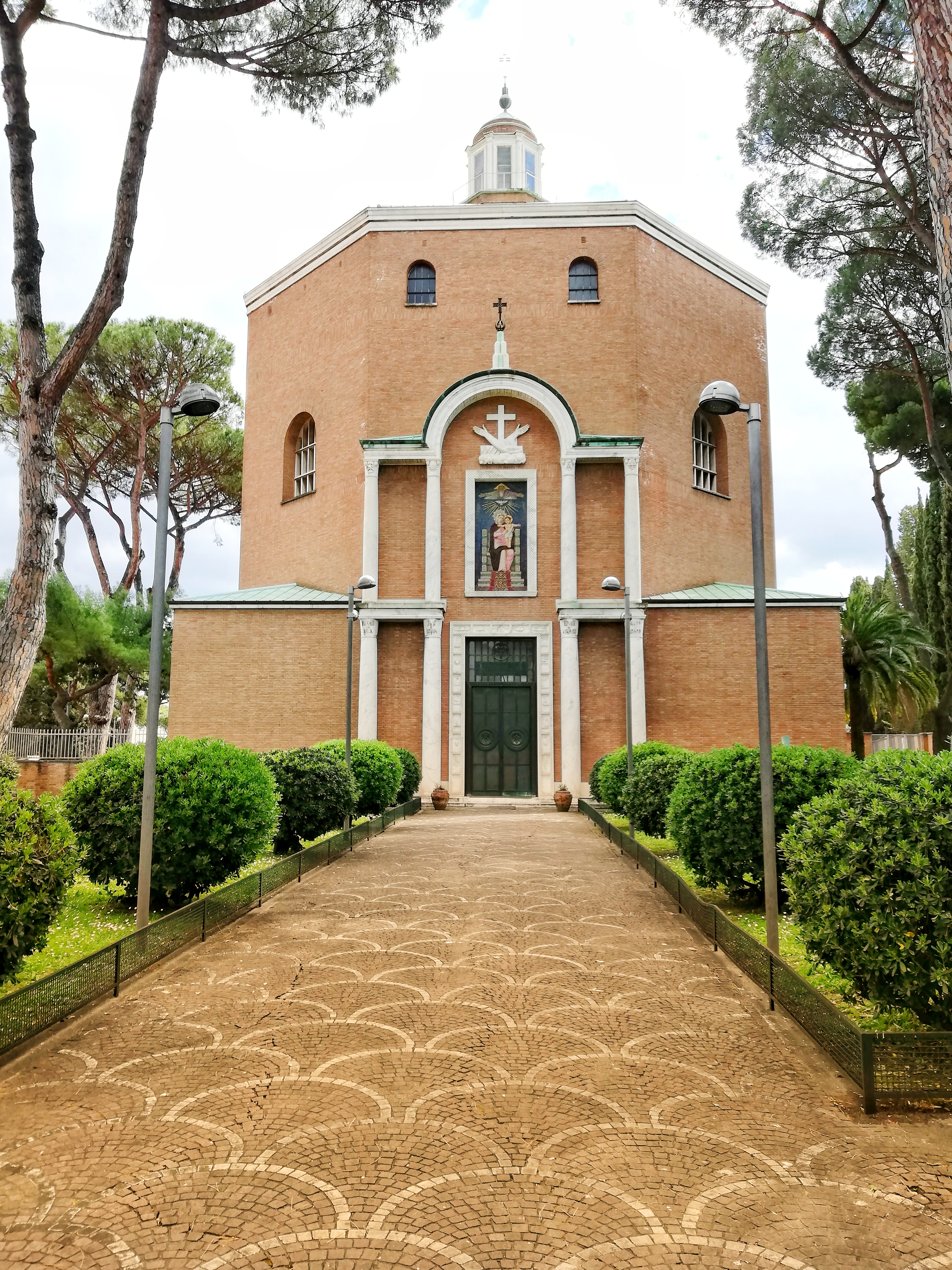
Church of St. Mary Mediatrix
