= Taliaferro (apple) =

Apple cultivar

Malus pumila "Taliaferro"
- Species: Malus pumila
- Cultivar: "Taliaferro"
- Origin: Virginia, United States, pre-1778

The "Taliaferro" (/ˈtɒlɪvər/ TOL-iv-ər), "Robinson", or "Robertson" was a cider apple grown at Monticello by Thomas Jefferson. This cultivar appears to be extinct, though some horticulturalists assert that the various cultivars such as "Nelson County Crab", "Highland County", and "Red Coat" may be related, or even the same cultivar under a different name.

Jefferson called the variety "Taliaferro" in reference to a Major Richard Taliaferro, who first discovered the fruit growing in a Virginia field. Taliaferro himself claimed that the apples came from a property owned by the Robinson family. Jefferson, in a possible orthographic error, once referred to the family as the Robertson family in a letter to James Mease, adding even more confusion to the history of the Taliaferro apple.

Jefferson stated the "Taliaferro" apple was very juicy and good for eating. He praised it as the best cider apple he had tasted, producing a hard cider similar to wine or Champagne. In 1835, a gentleman named William Kenrick described the fruits as being small, only 1-2 inches in diameter, with white, red-streaked skin. Kenrick claimed the apples were unfit for eating, but reaffirmed their value in cidermaking. Other contemporary accounts refer to the apple as a medium-sized, oblate apple with a straw colored skin striped with faint streaks of red on the side exposed to the sun.

== Origins ==
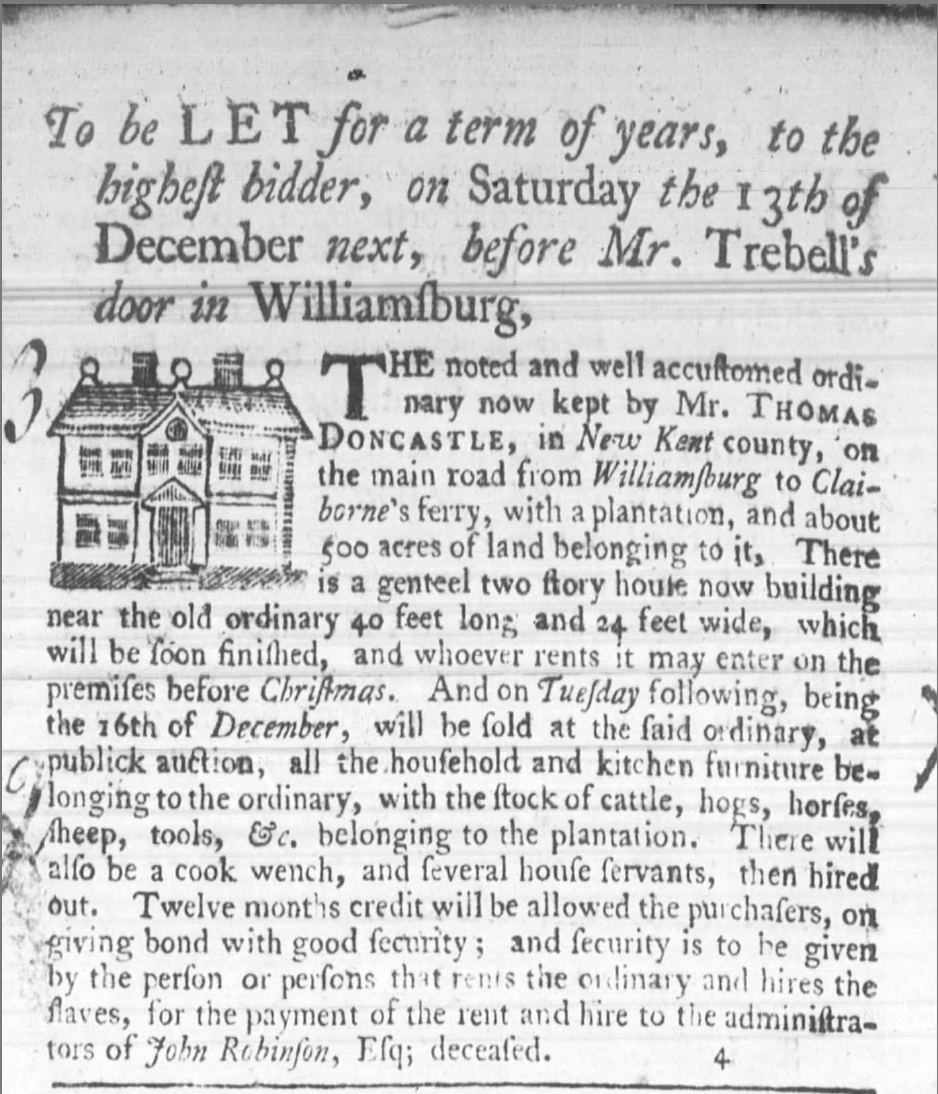
Newspaper advertisement for the sale of Doncastle's Ordinary, following the death of its owner, John Robinson. Published in the Virginia Gazette (Williamsburg, VA) December 11, 1766.

Jefferson wrote that the Taliaferro apple was discovered by Richard Taliaferro, growing "alone in a large old field near Williamsburg where the seed had probably been dropped by some bird." A likely location for this field has been determined to be a property that once housed a popular local tavern, Doncastle's Ordinary. Until his death in 1766, Doncastle's was owned by John Robinson, Speaker of the Virginia House of Burgesses.

== Sources ==
- Hatch, Peter J. (1998). The Fruits and Fruit Trees of Monticello. United States: University of Virginia. ISBN 0-8139-1746-8.
- Jefferson, Thomas (1944). Betts, Edwin Morris (ed.). Thomas Jefferson's Garden Book. United States: American Philosophical Society.
