= Monticello Association =

American nonprofit organization

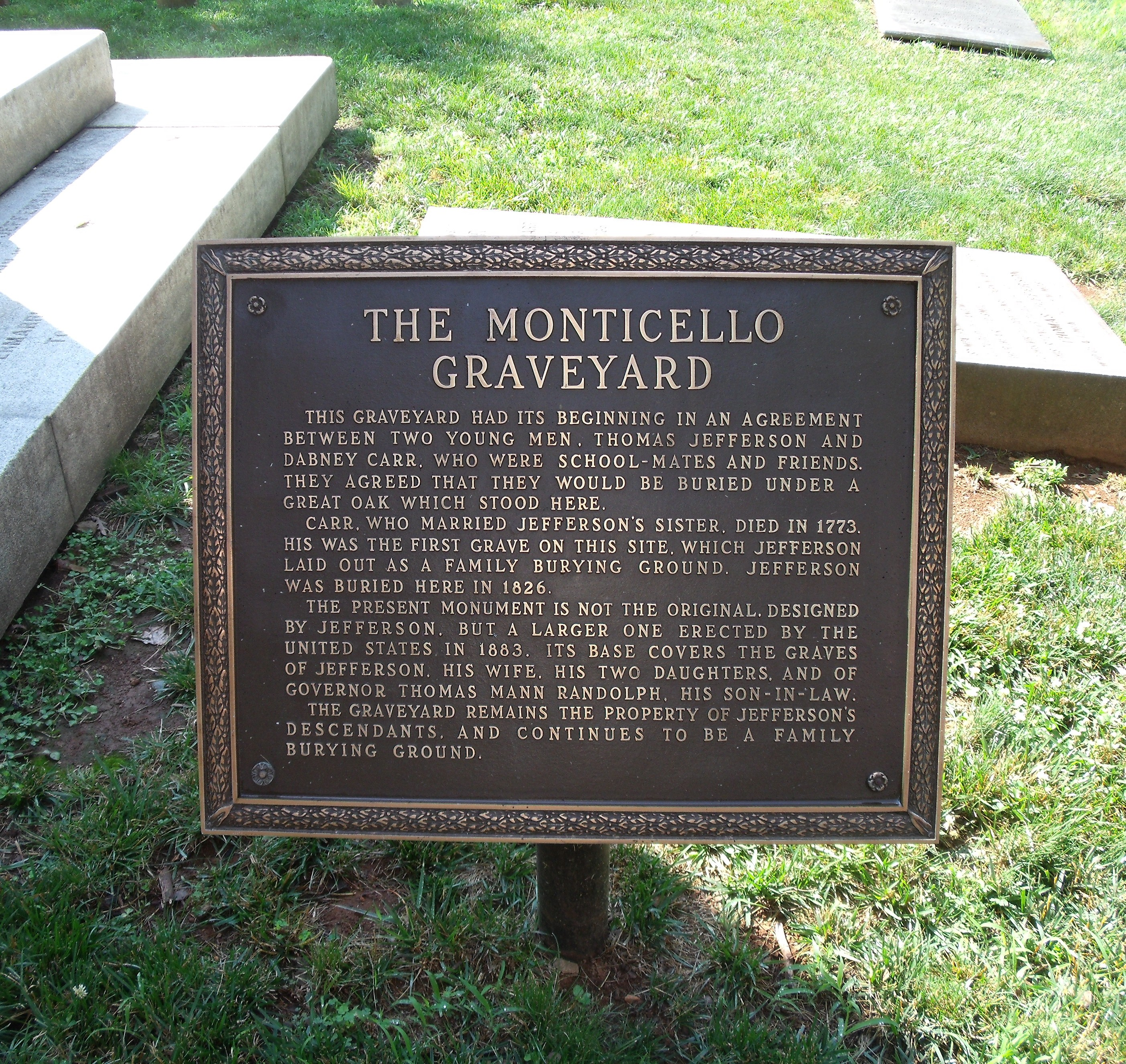
Monticello Graveyard plaque about origins and care of the graveyard

The Monticello Association is a non-profit organization founded in 1913 to care for, preserve, and continue the use of the family graveyard at Monticello, the primary plantation of Thomas Jefferson, the third President of the United States. The organization's members are lineal descendants of Thomas Jefferson and his wife Martha Wayles Skelton Jefferson. The site is located just outside Charlottesville, Virginia. Thomas Jefferson was the designer, builder, owner, and, with his family, a first resident of Monticello.

== Purposes ==
On Monday, April 14, 1913 (the first business day after Thomas Jefferson's birthday), a group of 13 descendants of Thomas Jefferson met in Charlottesville, Virginia, for the first meeting of the Monticello Graveyard Association. Officers were elected, and a constitution and bylaws were adopted. At the Annual Meeting in 1919 the membership voted to drop the word "Graveyard" from the title of The Monticello Association.

While there have been some changes in the Monticello Association since its founding, the scope and purposes of the Monticello Association have remained the same, as stated in Article II of its Constitution. Somewhat abbreviated, they are: (i) to preserve and care for the graves and grounds of the Monticello graveyard, (ii) to protect and perpetuate the reputation and fame of Thomas Jefferson, and (iii) to encourage association and friendship among Mr. Jefferson's descendants. Additional purposes of The Monticello Association include: (i) to defend the property rights of the lineal descendants of Col. T. J. Randolph as owners of the original Monticello graveyard, and (ii) to affirm the rights of the descendants of Thomas Jefferson to burial in the addition to the Monticello graveyard as provided in the covenant under which this property was deeded.

In his will, Jefferson conveyed the graveyard to Thomas Mann Randolph, Jr., his daughter Martha's husband, and then in trust to Martha Wayles Skelton Jefferson. He named his eldest grandson, Thomas Jefferson Randolph, as his executor. The original section of the graveyard was given to T. J. Randolph's descendants under a restrictive covenant deed and will, and a subsequent section given to all of the lineal descendants of Thomas Jefferson under a restrictive covenant deed.

Thus from its inception, the Monticello graveyard has been available to all lineal descendants of Thomas Jefferson's white children and has been managed and cared for by The Monticello Association as a single unit. Burials in the Monticello graveyard continue to this day.

== Membership ==
According to the membership information on the association's website, "Membership in the Association is limited to direct, lineal descendants of Thomas Jefferson, through his daughters, Martha and Maria."

There are two categories of membership:

1. Regular membership is open to any lineal descendant of Mr. Jefferson upon receipt of a completed application and annual dues. Dues are $40 per year. Adults aged 18–25 are eligible for reduced dues of $25. There are no dues for children under age 18. Life membership (regular) is available for the lump sum of $500.

2. Associate membership is offered to adopted and stepchildren, and to spouses of regular members if such persons show interest in the association by attendance at meetings, by correspondence with the Secretary, or by monetary contributions. No dues are assessed.

== The Monticello Graveyard ==
Jefferson left a sketch and specific instructions for the size and material of the monument he wished to be erected over his grave, and the inscription he would prefer. "Could the dead," Jefferson had written on the back of a partially mutilated envelope, "feel any interest in monuments or remembrances of them," he would prefer "on the grave a plain die or cube three feet without any mouldings, surmounted by an obelisk of six feet height, each a single stone: on the faces of the obelisk the following inscription and not a word more –

Here was buried
Thomas Jefferson
Author of the Declaration of American Independence
of the statute of Virginia for Religious Freedom
and Father of the University of Virginia

On the Die

Born April 2, 1743, O.S.
Died July 4, 1826

By these as testimonials I had lived and desire most to be remembered."

The "O.S." refers to the Old Style or Julian calendar in-use when he was born. (His birthday under the New Style or Gregorian calendar is April 13). Jefferson further directed that these memorials be made from "the coarse stone of which my columns [at Monticello] are made, that no one might be tempted hereafter to destroy it for the value of the materials." The obelisk was fabricated by John M. Perry and James Dinsmore, who had earlier helped Jefferson as carpenters and builders of Monticello, and placed over his grave with a white marble slab around the base.

While the three achievements listed by Mr. Jefferson for his tombstone were certainly major accomplishments, he omitted many others.

The Monticello Association, mindful of the historic importance of the Monticello Graveyard, in 1956 erected a bronze plaque near the graves of Mr. Jefferson and Dabney Carr to inform visitors about the origins and care of the Graveyard. The inscription bears these words:

This Graveyard had its beginning in an agreement between two young men, Thomas Jefferson and Dabney Carr, who were schoolmates and friends. They agreed that they would be buried under a great oak which stood here. Carr, who married Jefferson's sister, died in 1773. His was the first grave on this site, which Jefferson laid out as a family burying ground. Jefferson was buried here in 1826. The present monument is not the original, designed by Jefferson, but a larger one erected by the United States in 1883. Its base covers the graves of Jefferson, his wife, his two daughters, and Governor Thomas Mann Randolph, his son in-law.

The Graveyard is owned by the Jefferson descendants of the Monticello Association, who limit burial in the cemetery to lineal descendants of Thomas Jefferson.

In 1993 The Monticello Association erected another bronze plaque next to the one that was erected in 1956, showing the location of 19 graves in the front portion of the graveyard. Descendants and their families continue to be buried in the back portion of the graveyard. Burial is restricted to the descendants of Jefferson's two white daughters (see "Controversy" section below).

== Annual meetings ==
The pattern for the annual meeting weekend of The Monticello Association has changed little over the lifetime of The Monticello Association, but the date has had to be changed from time to time to avoid conflict with other functions in Charlottesville, primarily at the University of Virginia. During the past few years the annual meeting has occurred on the second Sunday in June.

On Saturday afternoon, after public visiting hours, The Monticello Association holds a private reception and open house at Monticello. Guided tours of the House and grounds are provided by the staff of the Thomas Jefferson Foundation. This practice began in 1970. On Saturday evening the family has a social occasion, which began shortly after World War II. In recent years this activity has become more organized, and the family recently has been gathering at Michie Tavern, an historic and famous tavern of the 1700s located on Monticello mountain, just below Monticello. The tavern staff provides guided tours of the museum, which contains an extensive collection of pre-revolutionary furniture and artifacts. A buffet supper is also served featuring typical dishes of the colonial era, with period music provided by a strolling minstrel. These social occasions provide opportunities for members of the family from all over the country to get together on an informal basis. From these gatherings have grown close friendships between distant cousins who otherwise would not know one another.

On Sunday the family first gathers at the Monticello Graveyard. The affair is a modest ceremony, with remarks by the President, the reading of prayers, and the announcement of those who have died during the past year. The young children present also are invited to place flowers on Mr. Jefferson's grave. Following the ceremony at the Monticello Graveyard, the members of the family repair to a suitable place in Charlottesville, Virginia for a luncheon and business meeting. From 1925 to 1950, the luncheon was held at Monticello in Jefferson's own dining room with many members seated around Jefferson's own dining table. By 1950, The Monticello Association had outgrown the dining room, and from 1950 to 1982, the family was served a buffet luncheon at the Keswick Hunt Club. For several years thereafter lunch was served in the Dome Room of the Rotunda at the University of Virginia until the family outgrew that space. In recent years the luncheon and business meeting have been held at Alumni Hall at the University of Virginia, at the Visitor Center at Monticello, or some other suitable place in Charlottesville.

The business sessions which follow the luncheon are generally brief, but not always pro forma. From time to time actions recommended by the executive committee or a committee chairman provoke sharp debate. Indeed, it is not unknown for recommended action to be modified, or even abandoned, if it is clear that there is considerable opposition. On the whole, however, considering the diversity of age, geography, personality, and philosophy represented in the family, the prevalence of good humor and search for consensus generally mark the business sessions.

== Jefferson–Hemings controversy ==
The association has traditionally been composed of European-American descendants of Thomas Jefferson and his wife Martha Wayles Skelton. He was long rumored to have had a liaison with his slave Sally Hemings, beginning years after his wife died, and six children with her. In 1998 a Y-DNA study showed that a descendant of Eston Hemings Jefferson, the youngest son of Hemings, had Y-DNA that matched that of the Jefferson male line. The same study showed there was no match between the Hemings descendant and the Carrs, named by Jefferson descendants as the fathers of Hemings' children. The study team noted that the body of historical evidence made it most likely that Thomas Jefferson was the father of Eston and all of Hemings' children. Together with existing historical evidence, the DNA study convinced former skeptics and Jefferson biographers, such as Joseph Ellis and Andrew Burstein, that the president had a long relationship with Hemings and likely fathered all her children. The Carr nephews, identified by Jefferson's grandchildren as the father(s), were shown to have no genetic connection to the Hemings descendant.

The DNA study was done after Annette Gordon-Reed published her analysis of the historiography in 1997, in which she showed how historians had shown bias and overlooked evidence. The course of Jeffersonian scholarship has changed. It is widely accepted that Jefferson had a long liaison with Hemings and fathered all her children. The Thomas Jefferson Foundation, which operates Monticello, has incorporated the material into its training for guides, published new studies related to this conclusion, and expanded its research agenda. In 2003 Susan Stein, curator of Monticello, said, "more than 90 percent of professional historians who've looked at this are persuaded that Jefferson and Hemings had a sustained relationship." Some historians disagree with the findings and have offered Randolph Jefferson and other candidates for paternity.

After the DNA study was made public, Association member Lucian Truscott IV met some of his Hemings cousins on The Oprah Winfrey Show and invited them as guests to the associations' 1999 annual meeting. The president of the association did not allow a vote on whether to include the descendants as honorary members, saying this status was reserved for persons at the University of Virginia and the Thomas Jefferson Foundation. A majority of the association members voted to require additional studies before deciding on membership of Hemings descendants. Members such as Lucian K. Truscott IV and some others publicly disagreed with this decision. The association's decision precluded Hemings' descendants from burial at the privately owned Jefferson family cemetery at Monticello, a privilege reserved to members.

Some Hemings descendants filed applications for membership, which officials said had to satisfy the association's criteria for genealogical documentation. Truscott has continued strongly to support approval of the Hemings' descendants as members of the association.

In the fall of 2001, the National Genealogical Society Quarterly reported that the "weight of historical evidence" and the DNA study were sufficient to conclude that Jefferson had a long relationship with Hemings and fathered all her children. They strongly criticized a report issued that year by the newly formed Thomas Jefferson Heritage Society (TJHS); they said it failed to follow best practices in historical and genealogical analysis. Helen F.M. Leary, a certified genealogist, concluded: "the chain of evidence securely fastens Sally Hemings's children to their father, Thomas Jefferson." In a 2002 lecture at the Library of Congress, Leary said: "[M]uch of the evidence marshaled against the Hemings-Jefferson relationship has proved to be flawed by reason of bias, inaccuracy or inconsistent reporting. Too many coincidences must be accounted for and too many unique circumstances "explained away" if a competing theory is to be accepted. The sum of the evidence points to Jefferson as the father of Hemings' children."

== Monticello Association study and vote ==
In 2002 the Monticello Association's members reviewed the report by their commissioned scholars and voted overwhelmingly against admitting the Hemings descendants or changing their criteria for evaluating membership applications of lineal descendants. These are dependent on documentary genealogical evidence, some of which is generally unavailable for descendants of slaves. The association members acknowledged that such documentation would be difficult for the Hemings descendants to gather, but thought other evidence was inconclusive.

== New reunions ==
In July 2003 more than 100 Hemings descendants and 12 Association members, who had supported their applications for membership, had their own reunion at Monticello. Dr. Daniel P. Jordan, president of the Thomas Jefferson Foundation which owns and runs the estate, told them, "Welcome home." At that reunion, John Works Sr., a Monticello Association member, said he hoped other Wayles-Jefferson descendants would eventually accept the Hemingses. He said, "Nobody has proof, really, of direct descendancy to Thomas Jefferson. But look around ... everyone is exchanging information and getting to know each other. That's what a family reunion is supposed to be about."

Four years later, 250 Americans descended from Thomas Jefferson through Martha Wayles Skelton Jefferson or Sally Hemings met again at Monticello. Organized by descendants of both sides of the family, the reunion was reported as "a small step towards healing". The private Monticello Association denied the crowd's access to the cemetery that weekend, claiming a concern for the grass.

In 2010 the international peace-making organization "Search for Common Ground" honored three Jefferson descendants for "their work to bridge the divide within their family and heal the legacy of slavery." They are Shay Banks-Young, who identifies as African American, and Julie Jefferson Westerinen, who identifies as European American, both descendants of Sally Hemings; and David Works, a Monticello Association member who is descended from Martha Wayles. They have been featured on NPR and in numerous venues across the country in talks about race and the larger Jefferson family.

Shay Banks-Young said her family always talked about where they came from. Julie Jefferson Westerinen first found out about her full heritage after Fawn McKay Brodie's biography of Jefferson was published in 1974. Her family recognized Eston Jefferson's name and discussed the book. Her father and his brothers had stopped telling about the link to Hemings and Jefferson in the 1940s, for fear that their children would be discriminated against. Julie's brother was the Eston Hemings descendant whose DNA matched that of the Jefferson male line. After studying the facts himself, David Works said, "I agreed pretty much with the Thomas Jefferson Foundation conclusion that the simplest and most reasonable explanation was that Jefferson fathered children with Sally Hemings." The three descendants have organized larger reunions and have started a new association, the "Monticello Community", "for all the descendants of workmen, artisans and slave, free, family, whatever, at Monticello."

== See also ==
- Thomas Jefferson Randolph
