= Alexander Rives =

American judge (1806–1885)

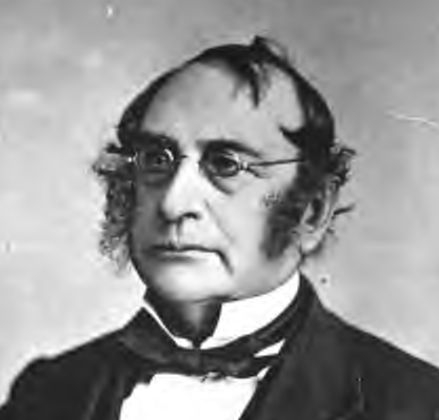

Judge of the United States District Court for the Western District of Virginia
- In office February 6, 1871 – August 1, 1882
- Appointed by: Ulysses S. Grant
- Preceded by: Seat established by 16 Stat. 403
- Succeeded by: John Paul

Justice of the Supreme Court of Virginia
- In office December 19, 1866 – June 3, 1869

Member of the Virginia House of Delegates from the Albemarle district
- In office December 1, 1834 – December 6, 1835 Serving with Thomas J. Randolph
- Preceded by: Thomas W. Gilmer
- Succeeded by: Thomas W. Gilmer

Member of the Virginia House of Delegates from the Albemarle district
- In office December 5, 1836 – January 6, 1839 Serving with Thomas J. Randolph
- Preceded by: Thomas W. Gilmer
- Succeeded by: Thomas W. Gilmer

Member of the Virginia House of Delegates from the Albemarle district
- In office December 6, 1841 – December 4, 1842 Serving with Valentine W. Southall
- Preceded by: Isaac A. Coles
- Succeeded by: Thomas J. Randolph

Member of the Virginia House of Delegates from the Albemarle district
- In office January 12, 1852 – December 4, 1853 Serving with William T. Early
- Preceded by: John J. Bowcock
- Succeeded by: James W. Mason

Member of the Virginia Senate from the Albemarle district
- In office December 7, 1857 – December 1, 1861
- Preceded by: Benjamin F. Randolph
- Succeeded by: William D. Hart

Personal details
- Born: Alexander Rives; June 17, 1806 Oak Ridge, Virginia, US
- Died: September 17, 1885 (aged 79) Charlottesville, Virginia, US
- Resting place: Monticello Memorial Park; Albemarle County, Virginia
- Party: Democratic
- Other political affiliations: Whig; Republican
- Education: Hampden–Sydney College
- Alma mater: University of Virginia
- Profession: lawyer, planter, judge

Alexander Rives (June 17, 1806 – September 17, 1885) was a Virginia attorney, politician and plantation owner. He served in both houses of the Virginia General Assembly, as a justice of the Supreme Court of Virginia and as a United States district judge of the United States District Court for the Western District of Virginia.

== Early and family life ==
Born on June 17, 1806, in Oak Ridge, Nelson County, Virginia, to the former Margaret (Peggy) Cabell (c. 1770–1815) and her husband Robert Rives (1764–1845), Rives was related to the First Families of Virginia through his mother and later wife. His father Robert Rives of Sussex County had served in the patriot army during the final Yorktown campaign, then became a commission merchant (first operating as Robert Rives and Company and later as Brown, Rives and Company), with Thomas Jefferson as one of his clients. He built a plantation, Oak Hill, in Nelson County in 1802, where he would bury his wife, and later be buried. On his death in 1845, the personal estate of Rives Sr. would be valued at $100,000 (~$3.19 million in 2024) and included lands in Albemarle, Buckingham, Campbell and Nelson Counties. His elder brother William C. Rives would become a Virginia and federal legislator as well as twice U.S. Minister to France, and Robert Rives Jr. (1798–1869) would also serve in the Virginia House of Delegates. His distant nephew Alexander Brown wrote books about the early history of Virginia as well as The Cabells and their Kin. Rives graduated from Hampden–Sydney College in 1825 and from the University of Virginia in 1829.

== Career ==
Like his father and other family members, Rives operated his plantations using enslaved labor. In the 1830 federal census, he owned one enslaved man, an enslaved woman also between 20 and 30 years old, and a girl in Albemarle County. A decade later, Rives owned 17 enslaved men and boys and 13 enslaved women and girls. In the 1850 federal census, Rives owned 69 slaves in Albemarle County. In the final prewar census, Rives owned 66 slaves in Albemarle County. His brother or nephew Robert Rives Jr. owned 43 slaves in Albemarle County in 1850. and 70 slaves a decade later. His other brother William C. Rives owned slightly more enslaved people in the county's Frederickville section. Following the war, Judge Rives continued to operate the farms using paid labor until entering the federal judicial service in 1871, as described below.

Meanwhile, in addition to his private legal practice, Albemarle County voters elected Rives as one of their (part time) representatives in the Virginia House of Delegates several times, as well as failed to re-elect him numerous times. Albemarle County voters elected him to the Virginia Senate in 1857, and he served one term in that part-time position. Following the American Civil War, Rives became the ninth Rector of the University of Virginia from 1865 to 1866. He was a justice of the Supreme Court of Virginia from 1866 to 1869.

== Politics ==
Rives was initially a Democrat, but like his brother William C. Rives, opposed the sub-treasury policy of President Martin Van Buren. Thus, Rives joined the Whig party in 1844.

In 1870, Rives ran for the United States House of Representatives as a Republican, but lost to Richard Thomas Walker Duke. Duke's son later said that Rives "had 'ratted' and became a 'scalawag' republican." Nonetheless, Rives had obtained a pardon for his opponent, to remove Duke's disability from seeking office, without charging Rives's usual fee of up to $500.

== Federal judicial service ==
President Ulysses S. Grant on February 3, 1871 nominated Rives to the United States District Court for the Western District of Virginia, a new seat authorized by 16 Stat. 403. He was confirmed by the United States Senate on February 6, 1871, and received his commission the same day. His service terminated on August 1, 1882, when he retired.

=== Notable case ===
In 1878, Judge Rives took the then-controversial view that the exclusion of blacks from jury service in Virginia state courts was a violation of the Equal Protection rights of two criminal defendants, granting their petitions for habeas corpus relief. The Virginia General Assembly passed a resolution denouncing the Reynolds decision, and demanding an appeal. The Supreme Court agreed in principle with Rives, in three decisions issued on March 1, 1880, but overruled his reasoning in Virginia v. Rives, ordering him to return jurisdiction over the petitioners to the Commonwealth. However, in Ex parte Virginia the court confirmed federal authority to enforce African Americans' rights to serve on juries, and in Strauder v. West Virginia the court declared states could not limit jury service to white men. Over 100 years later, the Supreme Court ruled that even the use of peremptory challenges where exclusion was made on the basis of race was unconstitutional, in Batson.

== Later years, death and legacy ==
Rives lived in Charlottesville until 1833; then at "Carlton" on Monticello until 1873, and spent his final years at "Eastbourne Terrace" in Charlottesville. > Rives died on September 17, 1885, in Charlottesville, Virginia. He was interred beside his wife and namesake son in Monticello Memorial Park, Albemarle County, Virginia. (Note: According to the 1880 U.S. Federal Census for District 12 of Charlottesville, Albemarle County, his household (dwelling 240) consisted of himself, his wife, daughter J.B. Coleman and 22 year old granddaughter P.S. Coleman, 20 year old nephew T.K.W. Morris (listed as a student), as well as a 30 year old black female cook and 15 year old black male servant.)

Some of Rives' papers before 1875 are held by the University of Virginia library.

The Rives family estate where Rives was born, Oak Ridge in Nelson County, was sold in 1867, but remains today as an event and wedding venue. It was renovated beginning in 1901 by magnate Thomas Fortune Ryan, and more recently by John Holland Sr. and his son John Holland Jr.

== Notes ==
Legal offices
Preceded by Seat established by 16 Stat. 403	Judge of the United States District Court for the Western District of Virginia; 1871–1882	Succeeded by John Paul
