= Georges Bank =

Oceanic bank in the North Atlantic

Coordinates: 41°12′36″N 67°22′51.9″W

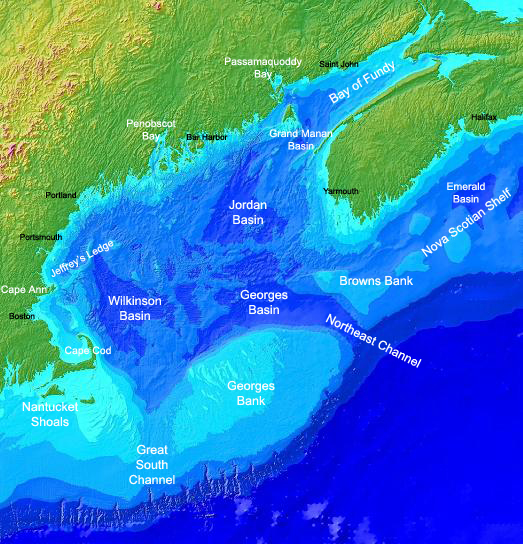
Map of the Gulf of Maine; Georges Bank is the light blue region in the bottom center of the image.

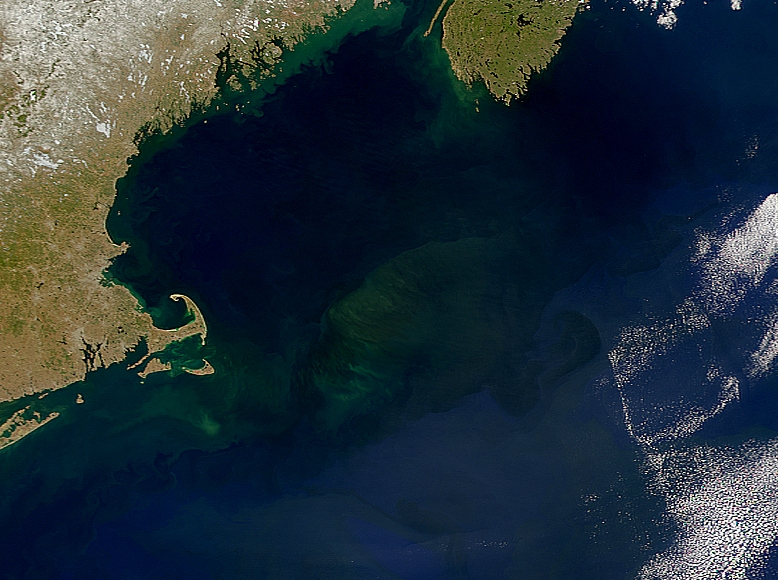
NASA visible satellite view of Georges Bank (center). Cape Cod is on the left, and southern Nova Scotia can be seen in the upper right.

Georges Bank (formerly known as St. Georges Bank) is a large elevated area of the sea floor between Cape Cod, Massachusetts (United States), and Cape Sable Island, Nova Scotia (Canada). It separates the Gulf of Maine from the Atlantic Ocean.

The 1610 Velasco Map, prepared for King James I of England, used the name "S. Georges Banck", a common practice when the name of the English patron saint, St. George, was sprinkled around the English-colonized world. By the 1850s, it was known simply as Georges Bank.

== Physical environment ==
Georges Bank is the most westward of the great Atlantic fishing banks. The now-submerged portions of the North American mainland are comprised in the continental shelf running from the Grand Banks of Newfoundland to Georges. Georges Bank was part of the North American mainland as recently as 12,000 years ago.

Roughly oval in shape, Georges Bank measures about 149 miles (240 kilometres) in length by 75 miles (121 kilometres) in width. Located 62 miles (100 kilometres) offshore, Georges Bank is part of the continental shelf. Its depth ranges from several meters to several dozen meters; the entire bank is at least 330 feet (100 m) shallower than the Gulf of Maine to the north.

Gulf of Maine shelf waters are the Bank's primary source. They enter the northern flank, move clockwise around the eastern end, and then westward along the southern flank, mostly emptying into the Mid-Atlantic Bight (the continental shelf ocean between Cape Hatteras and Georges Bank).

== Commercial fishing ==
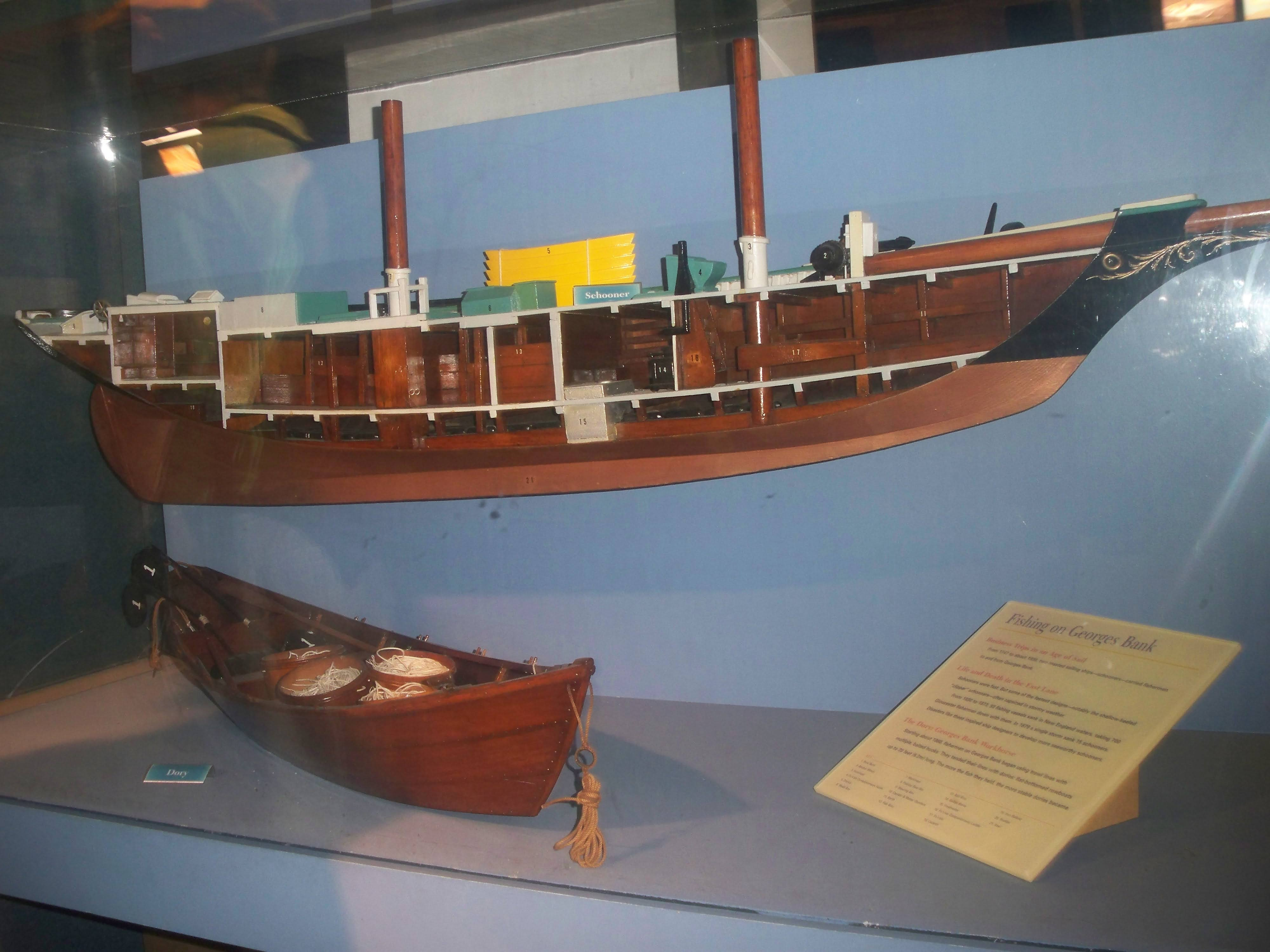
Fishing on Georges Bank models of Schooner and Dory from exhibit at the Woods Hole Science Aquarium (WHSA)

Georges Bank, draws its significance from its geographic location not necessarily from its productive potential. It is one most geographically accessible of all the fishing banks in the North Atlantic. This is due to its being accessible from New England's seaports.

For over 400 years, Georges Bank supported fisheries for Atlantic cod and halibut. Over time, bottom trawlers became very efficient, some catching as much cod in an hour as traditional boats caught in a season. Bottom trawlers, however, damaged the sea floor coral and sponge habitats, and federal fisheries regulations aim to control this large scale overfishing to establish future sustainability.

From 1976 to 1982, oil companies drilled ten exploratory wells in the U.S. part of the Georges Bank. None were successful, however, and both Canada and the United States have since imposed moratoriums on oil exploration and production on the Georges Bank, to ensure fisheries conservation.

The decision by Canada and the United States to extend fisheries jurisdiction out to 200 miles in 1977 led to overlapping claims on Georges Bank, and resulted in quickly deteriorating relations between fishers from both countries. Both nations agreed in 1979 to refer the question of maritime boundary delimitation to the International Court of Justice in The Hague. The ICJ delivered its decision in 1984 dividing Georges Bank fisheries between the two countries in a way that disappointed American fishermen. On September 15, 2016, President of the United States Barack Obama proclaimed the Northeast Canyons and Seamounts Marine National Monument to protect the area's marine biodiversity. This protected a portion of Georges Bank from fishing and mining. Despite the protection, commercial fishing for deep sea red crab and American lobster was allowed to continue within the monument for a grace period of seven years.

== See also ==
- Texas Tower 3
- Lobster Wars (TV documentary)
