= Brook Hill Farm =

Historic house in Virginia, United States

- U.S. National Register of Historic Places
- U.S. Historic district – Contributing property
- Virginia Landmarks Register
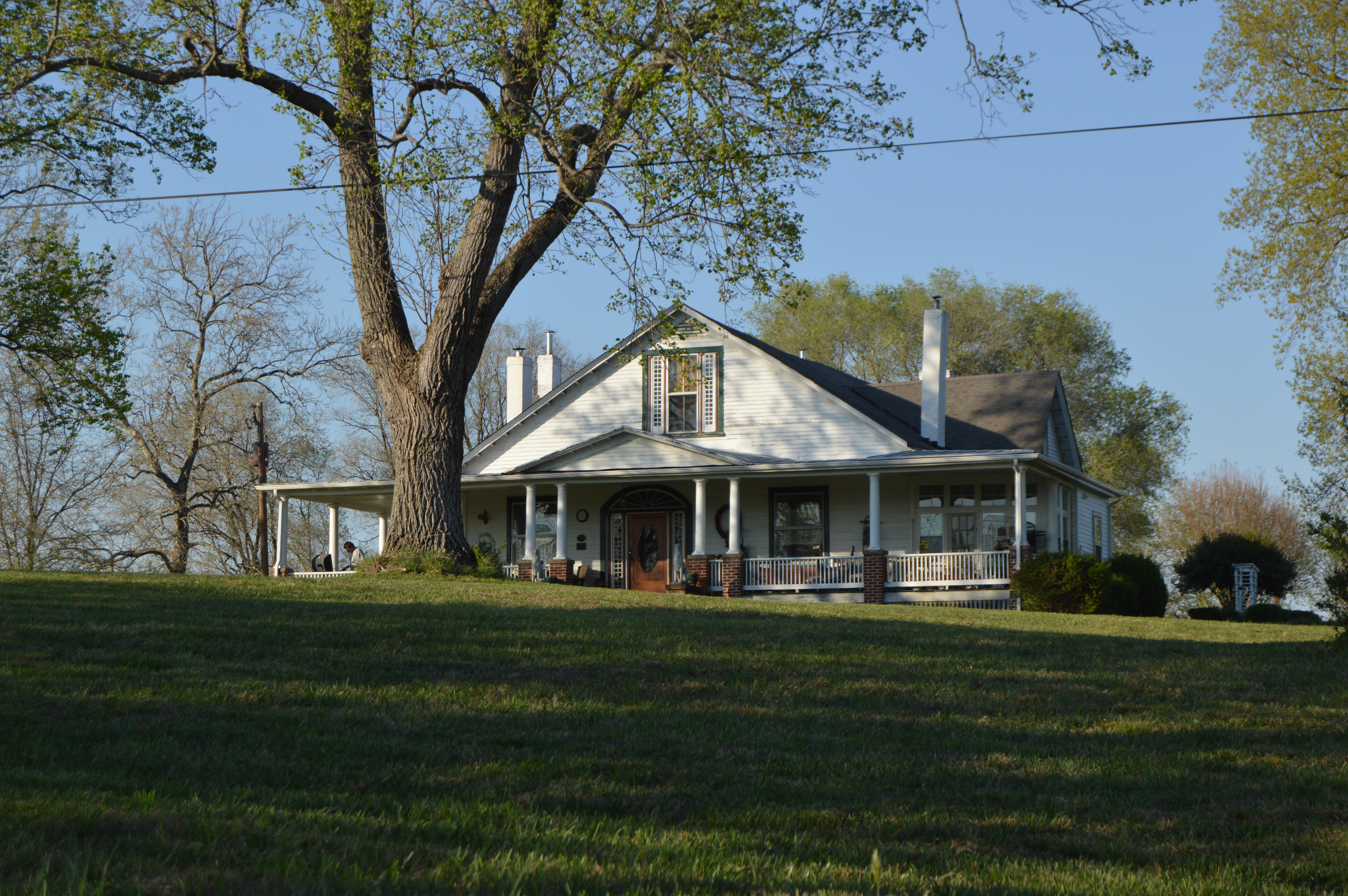
- Front of the house

- Location within Virginia Location within the United States
- Location: Bellevue Rd., 0.75 miles (1.21 km) south of U.S. Route 221, near Goode, Virginia
- Coordinates: 37°22′07″N 79°22′17″W
- Area: 44 acres (18 ha)
- Built: 1904
- Architect: Mrs. Graham Webb
- Architectural style: Queen Anne, Bungalow/craftsman
- NRHP reference No.: 97000489
- VLR No.: 009-0318

Significant dates
- Added to NRHP: June 6, 1997
- Designated VLR: September 18, 1996

Brook Hill Farm is a historic home and farm located near Forest, Bedford County, Virginia, USA. It was built in 1904, and is a 1½-story, frame Queen Anne style dwelling. It incorporates the broad, compact form of the Bungalow / Craftsman style. It has a wraparound porch with Doric order columns. Also on the property are a contributing original icehouse, hog barn, blacksmith's shop and a schoolhouse built in 1909. Historic sites include an old barn site and carriage house site.

It was listed on the National Register of Historic Places in 1997. It is located in the Bellevue Rural Historic District.
