= Thomas Jefferson Randolph =

American politician (1792–1875)

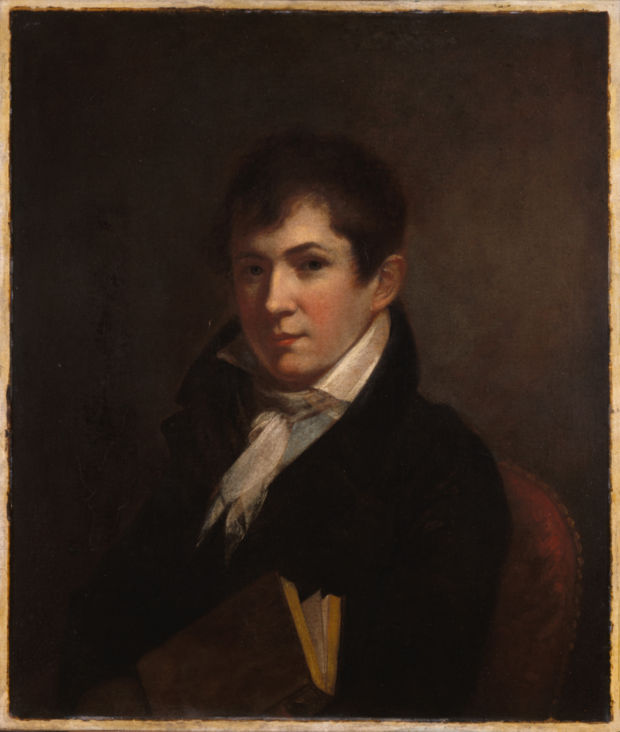
- Portrait by Charles Willson Peale (1808)

Member of the Virginia House of Delegates from the Albemarle district
- In office December 5, 1842 – December 3, 1843 Serving with Sheldon F. Leake
- Preceded by: Valentine W. Southall
- Succeeded by: Valentine W. Southall
- In office December 5, 1836 – January 6, 1839 Serving with Alexander Rives
- Preceded by: Valentine W. Southall
- Succeeded by: Valentine W. Southall
- In office December 1, 1834 – December 6, 1835 Serving with Alexander Rives
- Preceded by: Valentine W. Southall
- Succeeded by: Valentine W. Southall
- In office December 5, 1831 – December 1, 1833 Serving with Rice W. Wood, Thomas W. Gilmer
- Preceded by: Thomas W. Gilmer
- Succeeded by: Valentine W. Southall

Delegate from Albemarle County to the Virginia Convention of 1861
- In office February 13, 1861 – December 6, 1861
- Preceded by: Constituency established
- Succeeded by: Constituency abolished

Rector of the University of Virginia
- In office 1857–1864
- Preceded by: Andrew Stevenson
- Succeeded by: Thomas Lewis Preston

Delegate from Albemarle County to the Virginia Constitutional Convention of 1850
- In office October 14, 1850 – August 1, 1851
- Preceded by: Constituency established
- Succeeded by: Constituency abolished

Personal details
- Born: September 12, 1792 Charlottesville, Virginia, U.S.
- Died: October 7, 1875 (aged 83) Edge Hill, Virginia, U.S.
- Resting place: Monticello
- Party: Democratic
- Spouse: Jane Hollins Nicholas (m. 1815; died 1871)
- Children: 13 (incl. Sarah)
- Parents: Thomas Mann Randolph Jr. (father); Martha Jefferson (mother)
- Profession: Politician, planter, lawyer, soldier
- Known for: Eldest grandson and namesake of Thomas Jefferson

Military service
- Allegiance: Confederate States
- Branch/service: Confederate army
- Rank: Colonel
- Battles/wars: American Civil War

Thomas Jefferson Randolph (September 12, 1792 – October 7, 1875) was a Virginia planter, soldier and politician who served multiple terms in the Virginia House of Delegates, as rector of the University of Virginia, and as a colonel in the Confederate Army during the American Civil War. The favorite grandson of President Thomas Jefferson, he helped manage Monticello near the end of his grandfather's life and was executor of his estate, and later also served in the Virginia Constitutional Convention of 1850 and at the Virginia Secession Convention of 1861.

== Early life and education ==
Thomas Jefferson Randolph was the eldest son of Thomas Mann Randolph Jr. (who later became Virginia's governor) and Martha Jefferson Randolph (a/k/a "Patsy"). His mother was the eldest daughter, and he was the eldest grandson of United States President Thomas Jefferson. Born into the First Families of Virginia, Randolph was also a lineal descendant of Pocahontas. He had an elder sister and seven other siblings who survived infancy. Randolph received a private education suitable to his class, and partly grew up at Monticello as well as his grandfather's Poplar Forest plantation. His parents moved into Monticello in 1809, but they would separate (Randolph, his mother, and siblings remained at Monticello) because of his father's alcoholism.

When Jefferson was 15 (in 1807), his father sent him to Philadelphia for further studies, which Jefferson in part directed toward botany, other natural sciences and anatomy.

Randolph soon became the family leader. In 1819, his alcoholic brother in law, Charles Bankhead (son of Jefferson's friend John Bankhead and married to his eldest sister Ann Cary Randolph), severely wounded Randolph at the Albemarle County courthouse, to Jefferson's consternation. Jefferson died when Randolph was 34, and his father two years later.

=== Marriage and family ===
In 1815 Randolph married Jane Hollins Nicholas (1798–1871), daughter of Wilson Cary Nicholas, a former Congressman, Senator and like Jefferson and his son-in-law Virginia Governor. Soon, Nicholas became president of the new Richmond branch of the Second Bank of the United States and helped Jefferson secure loans for nearly the next decade, but Jefferson also co-signed some of Nicholas' notes, which caused major problems following the Panic of 1819 and nationwide depression. Jane Nicholas Randolph established and taught school on the Randolph's Edgehill estate from 1829 until 1850, when Randolph's youngest brother George Wythe Randolph left that main plantation house with his wife and moved to Richmond, Virginia.

Meanwhile, Thomas and Jane Randolph had thirteen children:

- Margaret Smith Randolph (1816–1842)
- Martha Jefferson ('Patsy') Randolph (1817–1857)
- Mary Buchanan Randolph (1818–1821)
- Careyanne Nicholas Randolph (1820–1857)
- Mary Buchanan Randolph (1821–1884)
- Ellen Wayles Randolph (1823–1896)
- Maria Jefferson Carr Randolph (1826–1902)
- Carolina Ramsey Randolph (1828–1902)
- Thomas Jefferson Randolph, Jr. (1829–1872)
- Jane Nicholas Randolph (1831–1868)
- Wilson Cary Nicholas Randolph (1834–1907)
- Meriwether Lewis Randolph (1837–1871)
- Sarah Nicholas Randolph (1839–1892)

=== Hemings controversy ===
Since the late 20th century, some criticized Randolph for falsely telling historian Henry Randall that his uncle Peter Carr (Thomas Jefferson's nephew) was the father of Sally Hemings' children (rather than his blood relatives, as was later found true). Randolph admitted some of Hemings' children strongly resembled the president. Now, most historians accept that Jefferson had a long relationship with Sally Hemings and fathered her six children. As mentioned below, Randolph had a complex relationship with slavery.

== Career ==
=== Planter and Jefferson's executor ===
A planter and leading citizen of his native Albemarle County, like his father and grandfathers, Randolph operated plantations (including Monticello) using enslaved labor. On returning to Monticello in 1815 during a drought crisis, Randolph began to manage Monticello for his (separated) mother and grandfather. In 1817 Jefferson leased another two of his quarter-farms, Tufton and Lego, to Randolph, who soon built a stone house and moved his growing family into the Tufton premises.

Randolph had been close to his grandfather and was appointed executor of his estate in Thomas Jefferson's will, executed in 1826. As that year had begun, following the conclusion of his father's term as Virginia's 21st governor and escalation of problems with his creditors following mounting debts, Randolph managed to purchase his father's plantation at Edgehill at a foreclosure auction. Jefferson's main estate was also heavily encumbered by debt at his death on July 4 of that year (particularly after this Randolph's father-in-law Nicholas defaulted on his debts before 1823). In fact, the principal of Jefferson's debts would not be extinguished until 1878 (after this Randolph's death), and Nicholas' marriage of approximately $70,000 became the bulk of the $100,000 plus shortfall in Jefferson's estate (plus his Monticello plantation would only bring $7100 when finally sold in 1831, though for years valued at over $70,000). In any event, Randolph ordered Monticello goods and property sold, including the 130 enslaved people owned by Jefferson. Thus, on January 19, 1827, about six month's after the former President's death, Randolph held an auction of the people Jefferson enslaved. The proceeds of the auction paid off about $35,000 of the debt's principal and another $12,840 of interest and expenses. His mother withheld Sally Hemings from the auction and gave her "her time," which informally allowed her to live freely in Charlottesville, Virginia with her two younger sons.

Jefferson had formally freed Madison and Eston in his will, after allowing their older sister and their older brother to "run away" in 1822. Then Mrs. Martha Randolph left Monticello after the furnishing auction and eventually went to live in Boston with her daughter (this Randolph's sister), only to return to Virginia to reconcile with her husband and attend his deathbed at Monticello in 1828. News about her penniless state at age 60 led the South Carolina and Louisiana legislatures to each present her with $10,000. She would live with Randolph and other children at various times before her own death in 1836 and burial at Monticello.

In the 1850 federal census, Randolph owned 46 enslaved people in Albemarle county, ranging from 79- and 70-year-old women and a 75-year-old man to a nine-year-old boy and girls aged five, three and one year old. Randolph repaired his fortunes in the 1850s, when he used the people he enslaved to build sections of the Virginia Central Railroad. All told Randolph used 32 enslaved people to build two stretches of railbed. In the 1860 federal census, Randolph owned one 3-year-old girl who lived with 28 slaves owned by his son Thomas Jefferson Randolph Jr. in Frederickville in Albemarle County, and 34 slaves who lived with him (16 of them 5 years old or younger).

=== Political career ===
Albemarle County voters elected Thomas Randolph as one of their delegates (part-time) to the Virginia House of Delegates multiple times, but also refused to elect him multiple times, instead often electing Valentine W. Southall, who would eventually rise to become speaker of that historic legislative body. During several of Thomas Randolph's legislative terms, he often served alongside Alexander Rives, younger brother of William C. Rives, who was this Randolph's friend since their school days and who had frequently visited Monticello and built his plantation home Castle Hill nearby after marrying a daughter of Thomas Walker who owned that plantation.

After Nat Turner's slave rebellion of 1831, Randolph introduced a post nati emancipation plan in the Virginia House of Delegates. This would have provided for gradual emancipation of children born into slavery after July 3, 1840, requiring that they serve an apprenticeship, then leave the state upon coming of age. It was defeated 73 to 58. By 1850, however, Randolph had largely dispensed with his grandfather's commitment to eliminating slavery from Virginia, and actively adopted a proslavery ideology.

In 1850, Randolph was elected to the Virginia Constitutional Convention of 1850, as one of four delegates jointly elected from Albemarle and adjoining Nelson and Amherst Counties.

=== Author and educator ===
In 1829, Randolph published Memoir, Correspondence and Miscellanies: from the Papers of Thomas Jefferson. It was the first collection of Jefferson's writings. Shortly thereafter, he became a member of the Board of Visitors at the nearby University of Virginia. Links to other of Thomas Jefferson Randolph's works are below.

Randolph also allowed his wife and unmarried sisters to teach school at what had been the original house on his Edgehill estate beginning in 1829. His sister Cornelia Randolph (1799-1871) taught painting, drawing and sculpture there before the American Civil War, during which she moved to Alexandria, Virginia to live with female relatives.

From 1857 to 1864, Randolph served as the rector of the University of Virginia, succeeding Andrew Stevenson.

=== Civil War and later years ===
Albemarle County voters also elected Randolph along with Southall and James P. Holcombe as their delegates to the Virginia Secession Convention of 1861. His youngest brother, George Wythe Randolph, a U.S. navy veteran who had formed an artillery militia unit in Richmond in 1859, became one of Richmond's delegates to the convention and spoke in favor of secession at that convention. G.W. Randolph also drew praise during the one battle his artillery fought near Yorktown, and became the Confederate States Army Secretary of War for eight months in 1862. He would resign for health reasons but win election to the Virginia Senate for the remaining years of the war, though he would late in the war run the federal blockade in order to seek medical treatment, visiting spas in England and Europe before returning in 1866. During the American Civil War, this Randolph held a colonel's commission in the Confederate Army, but likely never fought. Most planters (as owners of more than 10 slaves) were excused from active service.

Continuing his activity in politics after the war, Randolph served as the temporary chairman of the 1872 Democratic National Convention.

== Death and legacy ==
Randolph survived his wife by several years. He died at Edgehill on October 7, 1875, following a carriage accident, and was buried beside her in the Monticello family graveyard. His Tufton estate is now part of Monticello, and hosts the Thomas Jefferson Center for Historic Plants. Some of his (and his family's) letters are now held by the University of Virginia library.

=== Jefferson–Hemings controversy ===
The historian Henry S. Randall, in an 1868 letter to James Parton, also a historian, wrote that "The 'Dusky Sally Story'--the story that Mr. Jefferson kept one of his slaves, (Sally Hemings) as his mistress and had children by her, was once extensively believed by respectable men..." According to Randall, after Thomas Jefferson had died, his oldest grandson Randolph talked with the historian and personally noted the strong resemblance of the Hemings' children to his grandfather, their master. (Note: Randall recounted that Randolph had said the following: she [Hemings] had children which resembled Mr. Jefferson so closely that it was plain that they had his blood in their veins.... He said in one instance, a gentleman dining with Mr. Jefferson, looked so startled as he raised his eyes from the latter to the servant behind him, that his discovery of the resemblance was perfectly obvious to all.)

In the 1850s, Randolph told the biographer Henry Randall that Jefferson's nephew Peter Carr had been the father of Hemings' children. He also said that his mother had told him that Jefferson had been absent for 15 months prior to the birth of one of Sally Hemings' children, so could not have been the father. (Note: Randall passed this family history on to James Parton, and suggested his own confirmation of the material. At the request of Thomas Jefferson Randolph, Randall had avoided any discussion of Sally Hemings and her children in his own 1858 biography of Jefferson.) (Note: The two elements of family oral history were the basis for Parton's denial of Jefferson's paternity in his 1874 biography of the president, and his position was adopted by the succeeding 20th-century historians Merrill Peterson and Douglass Adair. In addition, Randolph's sister Ellen wrote to her husband identifying Samuel Carr, Peter's brother, as the father of Hemings' children. The 20th-century historian Dumas Malone used the letter to refute Jefferson's paternity, and was the first to publish it in the 1970s in one of his volumes of the lengthy biography. Later, 20th-century historians used Malone's extensive documentation of Jefferson's activities to determine that Jefferson was at Monticello for the conception of some of Hemings's children (he was absent for several days of the conception periods for Madison and Eston, and for half the conception period for Beverly; we have no records of Sally's residence during these periods). He recorded the children's births along with those of other slaves in his Farm Book, which was rediscovered and first published in the 1950s.) In 1998, the Carrs were disproved as possible fathers of Eston Hemings, Sally's youngest son, by the results of a Y-DNA study of their male descendants; no genetic link existed between the Carr and Hemings lines for the descendants of Eston Hemings. The test results showed a match between the Jefferson male line and the descendant of Hemings, but they showed nothing about the descendants of Sally Hemings's other children.

The historian Andrew Burstein has said, "[T]he white Jefferson descendants who established the family denial in the mid-nineteenth century cast responsibility for paternity on two Jefferson nephews (children of Jefferson's sister) whose DNA was not a match. So, as far as can be reconstructed, there are no Jeffersons other than the president who had the degree of physical access to Sally Hemings that he did."
