= Valentine W. Southall =

American politician

Valentine Wood Southall (c. 1793 – August 22, 1861) was a Virginia lawyer and politician. A Whig, he represented Albemarle County in the Virginia House of Delegates, and served as that body's Speaker 1840–1842 and 1844–1845. Albemarle County voters also elected him to serve in the Virginia Secession Convention of 1861, where he voted with the majority, initially against secession but changing his vote to secede.

== Career ==
Southall trained as a lawyer and was admitted to the Albemarle County bar in 1813. A frequent guest of Thomas Jefferson at Monticello, he succeeded Thomas Jefferson Randolph in 1817 as collector of the federal direct tax and internal duties for Virginia's 19th Collection District. Southall became the first secretary for the Board of Visitors of Central College and during Lafayette's visit in November 1824, presided over a dinner held at the Rotunda of the University of Virginia. Albemarle County County voters elected him nine times to represent them in the Virginia House of Delegates, where he served in the sessions of 1833–34, 1835–36, 1839–42, 1840–42, 1844-1845 and 1843–46. Fellow delegates elected him as their Speaker during the 1840–42 and 1844–45 sessions.

During the Virginia Secession Convention of 1861, he and secessionist James P. Holcombe represented Albemarle County. Although initially voting against secession, Southall revised his opinion after the events at Fort Sumter and voted to secede.
