= Patapsco Female Institute =

- U.S. National Register of Historic Places
- U.S. Historic district – Contributing property
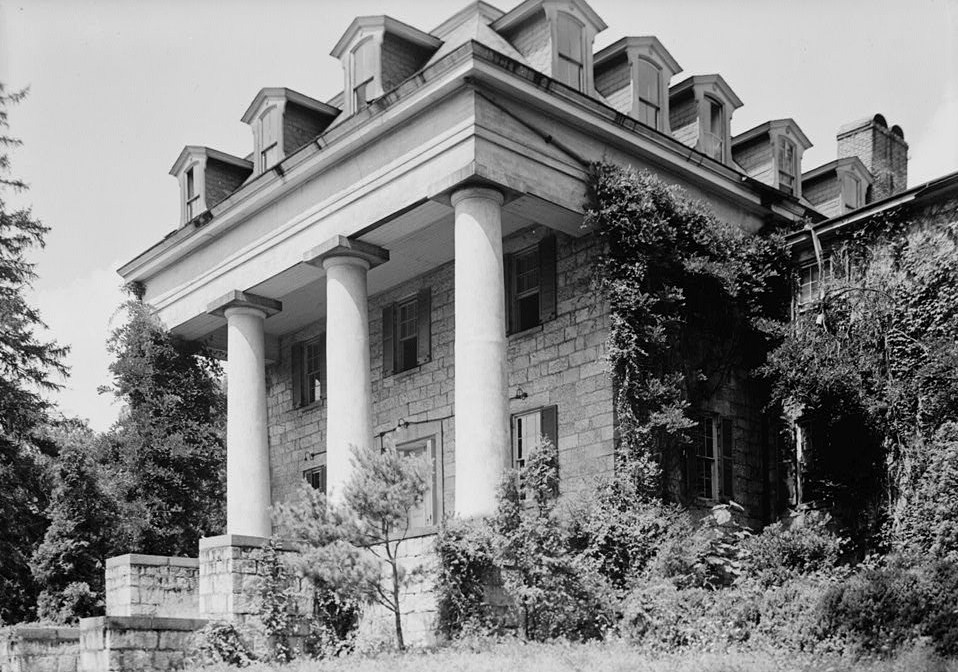
- Patapsco Female Institute in 1936

- Location within Maryland Location within the United States
- Location: Ellicott City, Maryland
- Coordinates: 39°16′14″N 76°47′49″W
- Built: c. 1837
- Architectural style: Greek Revival
- NRHP reference No.: 78001467
- Added to NRHP: July 31, 1978

Patapsco Female Institute (PFI) is a former girls' boarding school, now a partially rebuilt historical site, located on Church Road in Ellicott City, Maryland, United States. The school, which operated during 1837–1891, had 150 students ranging from age 12 to 18 at peak enrollment.

The grounds are currently used for outdoor theatrical performances by The Chesapeake Shakespeare Company.

In the 1930s the Institute was also known as "Warwick".

== History ==
The Patapsco Female Institute was chartered in January 1834. It was designed by architect Robert Cary Long Jr. and built by Charles Timanus, who also built the nearby Howard County Courthouse. It opened on January 1, 1837, as a finishing school.

=== Phelps era ===
By 1840, neither PFI nor the nearby boys' school (Rock Hill College) were doing well. The Protestant Episcopal Bishop of Maryland, William R. Whittingham, had a personal interest in education and became involved in both schools. Rev. Alfred Holmead transferred from Baltimore County to run Rock Hill, while Almira Lincoln Phelps became principal of PFI after being personally interviewed by Whittingham.

Phelps leased the school for seven years. Her husband John was listed as head of the family; in practice he was the business manager, taking care of the accounts, the grounds and buildings. Students were charged a basic fee for room, board, washing, and basic instruction in English. Extra fees were charged for other subjects such as foreign languages, music, and dance. The school eventually had several sources of income, including proceeds from state approved lotteries and $800 per annum for the admittance of lower income students who were to be trained as teachers. Maryland law stipulated that once the PFI had earned $15,000 from the lottery, the $800 annual state payment would cease, which occurred in 1860.

Phelps brought students to PFI from schools she had previously run in Rahway and West Chester; as such, many students were from states north of Maryland. The remainder of the existing student body was primarily from Maryland and Virginia.

Each academic year was composed of two 22-week sessions beginning in May and November. Diplomas were conferred in April and October. Typically, five or six girls earned diplomas during each period. Certificates were also issued for completion of a particular subject, such as English.

Under Phelps, the school's focus shifted to training young ladies to support themselves through teaching, and she helped find employment for students. She managed to find positions for some girls to live at a large house and teach a handful of girls. Sometimes, after being away gaining teaching experience and earning some money, a girl would return to PFI to finish her education. Phelps also had some teaching positions with a high turnover, where ex-students could have some teaching experience before moving on to seek employment elsewhere.

There was no organized activity for students who remained on campus when school was not in session; when Phelps left town, John remained to keep the school open. He also arranged for the buildings to be cleaned and repaired.

A condition of Phelps’s employment stipulated that she have an Episcopal priest on staff as chaplain. The Rev. Holmead was the first chaplain; Phelps replaced him in 1845 with a series of others. After she left in 1856, the chaplains at PFI were usually the rectors of the local Episcopal church, St. Peter’s.

Phelps signed a second seven-year lease in 1848. John died in 1849. Phelps decided not to renew the lease after it expired in 1855 but stayed on for an extra year so that the school could be expanded and be large enough to accommodate the students from the school run in Baltimore by her replacement, Robert Harris Archer.

=== Archer era ===
Robert Harris Archer (1812–1875) was a native of Harford County, Maryland. He was a graduate of West Point and resigned from the army in late 1837. In the 1840s he started a girls' school in Baltimore and ran them the rest of his life. (Note: This Robert H. Archer is sometimes confused with his first cousin, Robert H. Archer (1820–1878). The other Robert H. Archer was the brother of Confederate general James Jay Archer and served in the Confederate Army, mostly on his brother’s staff.)

Archer ran the school differently than Phelps. The school was larger, the fees were higher, the girls had more freedom of movement, and more students stayed at the school when classes were not in session. As such, the student body made a larger impression on the local community during Archer's 21 years (1856–1877) than under Phelps. Archer also had programs year-round. For example, he was observed in July 1857 with some of the girls at one of the spas in what was then western Virginia. The demographics of the student body were different, too. Archer had southern connections through his family, which was reflected in the student body of his school in Baltimore and continued at PFI.

The Civil War was hard on the PFI and Archer’s finances. In an 1866 letter to a former student, he wrote that the war almost ruined him and that he had $30,000 in outstanding pre-war debt due from the parents of students from the former Confederacy. The riots in Baltimore in the spring of 1861, due to the passage of Union regiments through Baltimore on their way to Washington, caused the school to be closed for a time. In the fall of 1862, the 12th New Jersey Regiment camped near the school, and the PFI closed again. According to the chaplain of the PFI, at the time, Charles S. Spencer, the school re-opened in the spring of 1863.

Archer’s first wife and first cousin, Elizabeth Archer, died in 1852. He married his second wife Mary Ringgold Archer (d. 1892) in 1858. By 1871, Archer was too ill to run the school. On July 10, 1871, the PFI board voted to transfer the balance of the third seven-year lease to Mary. She ran the school along with Roberta Archer (Robert Archer’s daughter from his first marriage) until the third lease expired in 1877, at which time they moved the school to Washington, DC, where it was named the Archer Institute.

=== End of the school ===
The PFI remained closed for a year as the board spent $10,000 on improvements in the physical plant. The PFI reopened in the fall of 1879. The school was run by Sarah N. Randolph (1839–1892). After her seven year lease expired in 1885, Sarah Randolph moved to Baltimore and ran a school there.

A September 1885 advertisement for the PFI shows that the school was open with Annie Matchett as Principal and Roberta Archer as Vice Principal. The two women were let out of their lease. Amanda Taylor became Principal as early as the 1886–87 academic year. She could not make ends meet and the school closed. In 1891, the joint stock company was dissolved and the property was sold to James E. Tyson.

=== Later history ===
The property was converted to a summer hotel called the Burg Alnwick Hotel. Fourteen years later, in 1905, it was purchased by a Miss Lilly Tyson and turned into a private home. In 1917, during the First World War, the building was called into service as a hospital. It was fitted with 50 beds to accommodate wounded veterans returning to the States. In later years, the building was used as a theater and again as a private residence. In 1938, the Howard County School board considered the site for a new school. The guests of the Burg Alnick Hotel used the grounds for shooting clay pigeons. In 1958, the property was sold to the final resident, Dr. Whisman for use as a nursing home. Howard County demanded that the owner remove all wood from the structure to prevent fires, including the roof, floors, and paneling; this left the institute in a permanent state of ruins. The property was willed to Dr. Whisman's alma mater, the University of Cincinnati.

In 1966, the county considered buying the eight acre property again as parkland from the University of Cincinnati using a news transfer tax for school and park projects. It was purchased for $17,500 by the County soon after. Since 1966 the building has been under the care of the 'Friends of the Patapsco Institute'; it has been stabilized and partially restored, and the grounds fenced to limit public access. The county finance director declared the building unrestorable, but budgeted $1.7 million to convert the area around it to a park.

== Notable alumni ==
- Lura Harris Craighead (1858–1926), author, parliamentarian, civic worker, and clubwoman

== See also ==
- List of Howard County properties in the Maryland Historical Trust
- Description(s) and stories relating to various historical sites in Howard County MD.
