= Lura Harris Craighead =

- Born: Lura Craig; January 17, 1858; Nashville, Tennessee, U.S.
- Died: January 27, 1926 (aged 68); Mobile, Alabama, U.S.
- Education: Ward–Belmont College; Patapsco Female Institute
- Occupations: author; parliamentarian; civic worker; clubwoman
- Spouse: Erwin Craighead (m. 1878)
- Children: 1
- Relatives: Richard Callaway; William Claiborne
- Writing career
- Genre: non-fiction
- Notable work: Lessons in parliamentary law

Lura Harris Craighead (1858–1926) was an American author and parliamentarian of the American South. Actively involved with civic and club work, she served as president of the Alabama Federation of Women's Clubs.

== Early life and education ==
Lura Harris was born January 17, 1858, at Nashville, Tennessee. She was the daughter of Major William Hooper and Frances Virginia (Martin) Harris, the former one of the first volunteers from Davidson County, Tennessee, in the Confederate States Army serving first as lieutenant in Co. A, 1st battalion, Tennessee cavalry, transferred to Gen. Joseph Wheeler's cavalry, and promoted to rank of major, being made chief quartermaster and a member of Wheeler's staff, afterwards quartermaster of Frank Hume's brigade, had part in several hard fought campaigns in Wheeler's division, a commission as colonel was made out for him just prior to the close of the war, but it never reached him, was slightly wounded once, captured and in prison once. Before the war, he was engaged in the wholesale grocery business in Nashville, afterwards for several years was at the head of a large business in New York City, later was engaged in the cotton brokerage business in Nashville, and died at the home of his daughter, Lura, at Mobile, Alabama, August 11, 1908.

She was the granddaughter of Nathan and Janet (Lowry) Harris, the former a surgeon, and for many years in the employ of the U. S. government at the Cherokee Indian agency, in Tennessee, and of Dr. Charles Kennan Venable and Frances Holder (Williams) Martin of Nashville.

She was the great-great-granddaughter of Robert and Mary (Venable) Martin, the former of King and Queen County, Virginia, located and married, later, in Prince Edward County, Virginia served in both the French and Indian War and the Revolutionary War, and one of the founders of Methodism in Virginia; of Richard Kennon, a member of the Provincial Congress from Chatham County, North Carolina, 1775, and was re-elected, 1779, assisted in establishing a regular government, resting entirely on popular authority, instead of the royal government, and annihilated every vestige of the power of the last royal governor of North Carolina, and a signer of the Mecklenburg Declaration of Independence; of Jesse Williams, one of the first to enlist from Culpeper County, Virginia in the war of 1776, held the rank of captain, and was in the battles of Great Bridge, Long Island, Harlem Heights, and the siege of Boston; and of John Holder, closely identified with Colonel Richard Callaway in his Kentucky career, married his daughter Frances, the Frances Callaway, who, with her sister, Elizabeth, and Jemima Boone, daughter of Daniel Boone, was captured by a roving band of Indians, July 14, 1776, while paddling about in a canoe on the Kentucky River just below the fort of Boonesborough, the young women being rescued by a party in which were included the three young men to whom they were betrothed, John Holder being one. She was the great-great-great-granddaughter of Charles Venable, a descendant of William Venable, Duke of Vernon, and of French origin, and of Richard Callaway, one of those bold delegates who were called together just outside the fort of Boonesborough to organize the government of Transylvania, who signed the Transylvania Declaration of Independence, May 23, 1775, captain in the French and Indian wars prior to 1758, one of the trustees to lay out the town of New London, Virginia, and one of two commissioners to mark and make the first public road over the Cumberland Mountains into Kentucky County, Virginia, justice of the peace, Kentucky County, 1776, member House of Burgesses from the same county, April, 1777, re-elected 1779, one of the most valiant defenders of Boonesborough, especially in the Duquesne Siege, 1778, killed by Indians in ambush, March, 1780; of Robert and Mourning (Glenn) Harris, the former a member of the House of Burgesses from Hanover, surveyor for Louisa County, Virginia, justice of the peace, moved to Albemarle County, Virginia and became large land owner from grant and in purchase, colonel the Albemarle militia, lived in Brown's Cove.name="Owen1921" />

She was the great-great-great-greatgreat-granddaughter of Robert and Mary (Claiborne) Rice-Harris, 1630–1701, the former came from the town of Harrisonton, Glamorgan, Wales, about 1650, and settled on the James River in Virginia, married Mary Claiborne Rice, daughter of Sir William Claiborne, also great-great-great-great-great-great-granddaughter of Sir William and Elizabeth (Butler) Claiborne.

Craighead received her early education in Miss Mary Dunn's private school, Nashville. She attended the public schools of New York City, and Ward–Belmont College, Nashville. She graduated from the Patapsco Female Institute, Baltimore, Maryland.

== Career ==
Craighead was a charter member, and first vice-president of the board of directors of the Alabama Boys' Industrial School, appointed by Gov. Joseph F. Johnston. She was a charter member of the Daughters of the American Revolution. Craighead served as president of the Mobile art league and school, 1897–99, the Mobile Reading club,Alabama Federation of Women's Clubs, 1899–1900, Mobile Shakespeare club, Mobile city and county school improvement association, St. Cecilia Chorus, Clara Schumann club, 1894–95, and the Benevolent home for aged and dependent women. She served as chair of the Mobile council of defense, woman's division; and the Mobile illiteracy campaign, 1916. She was a member of the committee on school improvement, Alabama federation of women's clubs from 1905, when it was organized, until it asked to be discharged, 1911, having completed its mission and introduced organized effort in each of the sixty-seven counties of the state. She led two campaigns in Mobile for the retention of kindergartens in the public school system of that city. She was a member of the War Camp community service during World War I, the Suffrage association, and the legislative committee of the Alabama Federation of Women's Clubs. She was particularly active in the effort to secure a law regulating child labor, resulting in one of the best child labor laws in the U.S. At the time of her death, Craighead was a member of the juvenile court commission and of the Alabama Child Welfare commission.

In addition to the foregoing, Craighead worked and spoke throughout the state on civic, educational and patriotic subjects.

Lessons in parliamentary law

Craighead was the author of Lessons on parliamentary law, a text book and manual; the leaflet, "Instant answer to everyday questions on parliamentary law"; a pamphlet, "All the pros and cons concerning child-labor", used as campaign propaganda by the Alabama and Georgia federations of women's clubs. History of Alabama federation of women's clubs was published posthumously. In addition, she wrote numerous newspaper articles and circulars in the interest of educational institutions, better laws, and philanthropic, civic and patriotic enterprises.

== Personal life ==
She was a Democrat and Episcopalian.

In 1878, in Nashville, she married Erwin Craighead. They had a son, Frank. She made her home in Mobile.

She died in Mobile, Alabama, January 27, 1926, after a lingering illness.

== Selected works ==
=== Books ===
- Lessons in parliamentary law, with table, diagram of procedence of motions; charts, drills, 1914
- Lessons in parliamentary law (revised and enlarged, 1925
- History of the Alabama Federation of Women's Clubs: 1895–1918, 1936

=== Other ===
- "All the pros and cons concerning child-labor", 1903 (pamphlet)
- "Instant answer to everyday questions on parliamentary law", 1915 (leaflet)
