= Alexander Brown (author) =

American historian (1843–1906)

- Born: September 5, 1843; Glenmore, Nelson County, Virginia
- Died: August 19, 1906 (aged 62); Union Hill, Nelson County, Virginia Colony
- Resting place: Union Hill, Nelson County, Virginia
- Other name: Sandy Brown
- Occupations: merchant, Confederate soldier, author
- Notable work: The Genesis of the United States (1890)

Alexander Brown (September 5, 1843 – August 19, 1906) was a Confederate soldier and American merchant, best known as the author of several books on the early history of Virginia.

== Early and family life ==
He was born at Glenmore in Nelson County, Virginia to Sarah Cabell Callaway Brown (1820-1849) and her husband Robert Lawrence Brown (1820-1880), the eldest of their three children, but his brother and sister died as infants. His paternal grandfather, also named Alexander Brown (1796-1864), was born near Perth, Scotland, came to Virginia in 1811, studied at the College of William & Mary, then worked for his merchant uncle at Lovingston in Nelson County. After taking over that business, with prominent planter Robert Rives as his partner, he married Rives' daughter Lucy Shands Rives, won several elections to represent Nelson County in the Virginia House of Delegates, served many years as the chief judge in Nelson County, and rose to the rank of General in the local militia. This grandfather Alexander Cabell owned 27 enslaved persons in Nelson County in 1850. His mercantile business also had a Richmond office, operating as Brown & McClelland (with James Bruce McClelland (1827-1862, who died of typhoid fever contracted in Confederate service) In 1860, he moved to Richmond and only owned one enslaved mulatto man aged 45 in Nelson County.

On his mother's side, this Brown came from one of the First Families of Virginia, the Cabells, who hailed from Buckinghamshire and held many government offices as well as operated plantations using enslaved labor in the upper James River area of Virginia. His Virginia ancestors included patriot Col. William Cabell who held most executive and legislative offices in Albemarle County from its inception, then Amherst County after its creation, and lived many years at "Union Hill" plantation, which was located in Nelson County by the time of its acquisition by this Alexander Brown. Two of his great-uncles, Alexander Rives and William Cabell Rives, were also prominent Virginian lawyers and politicians.

Meanwhile, his widowed son (this Brown's father) remarried in 1853, to Margaret Baldwin Cabell (1826-1877). By 1860 Robert L. Brown moved his growing family to Lynchburg where he and his second wife operated "The Lynchburg Female Seminary". They owned slaves, including a 30 year old Black woman, This Brown was raised by his grandmother, Mary Elizabeth Cabell and educated by private tutors at the "Benvenue" plantation from 1851 to 1856, then from 1856 through 1860 studied at a school run by Horace W. Jones in Charlottesville, Virginia. In the months immediately before Virginia's secession and the start of the American Civil War, Brown was studying at Lynchburg College.

== Confederate soldier ==
Brown and his father both volunteered for the Confederate States Army. His father received a commission as a lieutenant and remained in Lynchburg with its Provost Guard. Brown enlisted with the Staunton Hill Light Artillery, which organized in Richmond in September 1861. He fought for four years until he was rendered "stone deaf" in January 1865 by proximity to an exploding powder boat near Fort Fisher, North Carolina. Fort Fisher defended Wilmington, North Carolina, a crucial supply port for Robert E. Lee's forces in the war's closing months. The object of Union assaults and many artillery barrages in the winter of 1864–1865, it finally surrendered after the Second Battle of Fort Fisher on January 12, 1865, then Wilmington itself surrendered on February 22, 1865.

== Postwar years ==
Despite being deaf, Brown worked as a clerk in a grocery store in Washington D.C. immediately after the war (1865-1868), then in 1869 returned to Nelson County and became a farmer as well as merchant. His father returned to Nelson County in 1870 and was connected with Norwood High School, since Virginia's first post-war constitution for the first time established public schools. In 1867–1869, this Brown also traveled in Europe, Egypt and Australia.

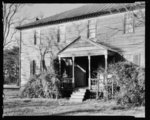
Union Hill plantation house, Warminster, Nelson County, Virginia

Alexander Brown devoted many years to studying and explaining Virginia's early history from the standpoint of the Virginia Company and later his kin, and managed to collect and preserve many historic documents. He was a member of the Virginia Historical Society, Tennessee Historical Society, American Historical Association and the Society of American Authors. Convinced that the Commonwealth's early history had not been truly written, he wrote magazine articles and read papers before historical groups.

In 1887, Brown traveled to the General Archive of Simancas in Spain, where he is credited with the rediscovery of the Velasco Map, a manuscript map of eastern North America traditionally dated to 1610. In his 1890 publication, The Genesis of the United States, Brown reproduced the map and presented an analysis of its origins and geographical features.

His publications include:

- New Views on Early Virginia History (1886), a pamphlet;
- The Genesis of the United States (two volumes, 1890), a valuable collection of previously unprinted historical manuscripts and of rare tracts;
- The Cabells and their Kin (1895);
- The First Republic in America (1898), about Virginia's early history;
- The History of our Earliest History (1898); and
- English Politics in Early Virginia History (1901).

== Personal life ==
In 1873, Brown married his distant cousin, Caroline Augusta Cabell, who died in 1876. In 1886, he remarried, to her sister, Sarah Randolph Cabell, but had no children by either of his wives. Both his wives were daughters by his second wife of Mayo Cabell (1800-1869), who had inherited the "Union Hill" plantation and mansion, opposed Virginia's involvement in the Civil War but supported his state, then experienced his estate being commandeered by Union troops, as well as post-war the post-war economic troubles.

== Death and legacy ==
Alexander Brown received honorary decrees from the College of William & Mary and the University of the South in his lifetime. He died at his Union Hill home in Norwood, Nelson County, Virginia, in 1906. Union Hill would be inherited by another of Mayo Cabell's daughters, Lucy Gilmer Cabell, who bequeathed it to her father's youngest child, Edward Marshall Cabell. In 1969, Randolph McGuire Cabell and his sister Elizabeth Cabell Dugdale sold it to Richmond's Ball Construction Company. Although many of the outbuildings had deteriorated by 1898, two porches had remained and two chimneys repaired, and electricity added. In 1980 it was moved to 1551 Carriage Lane in Goochland County by Mr. and Mrs. Royal E. Cabell. Jr. The Cabell Foundation, Inc. continues to maintain the graveyard. Many of his and his family's papers were donated to the College of William & Mary, where they are available in the law school's Swem library. Other papers are held by Duke University. The Cabell Foundation updated and republished his The Cabells and their Kin in 1939, and another edition, updated by Randolph W. Cabell, was published in 1993.
