= Bellevue (Goode, Virginia) =

Historic house in Virginia, United States

- U.S. National Register of Historic Places
- U.S. Historic district – Contributing property
- Virginia Landmarks Register
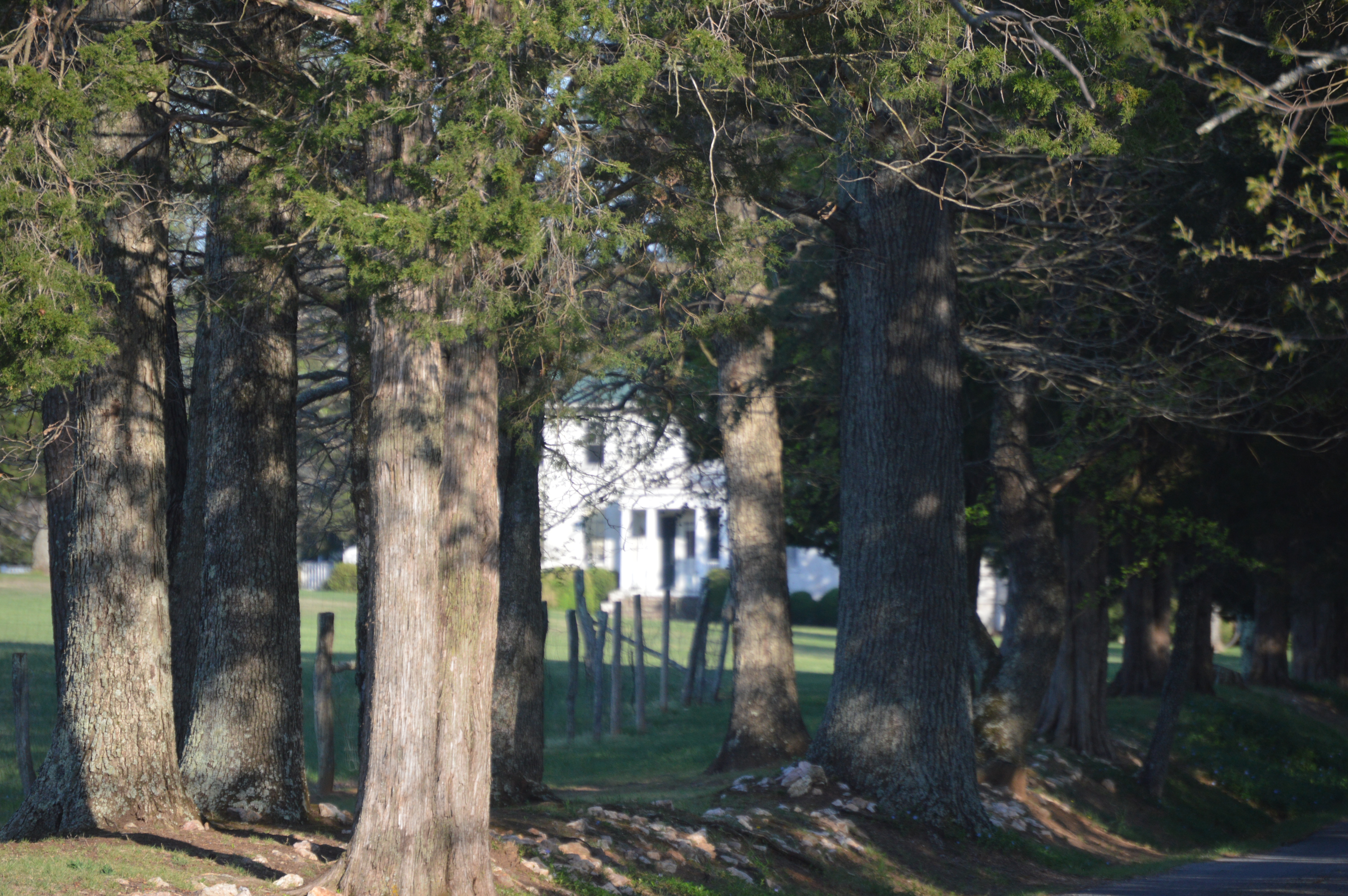
- Seen through the trees

- Location within Virginia Location within the United States
- Location: Bellevue Rd., 1 mile (1.6 km) east of Goode, Virginia
- Coordinates: 37°21′51″N 79°22′09″W
- Area: 24 acres (9.7 ha)
- Built: c. 1824-1870
- Architectural style: Federal
- NRHP reference No.: 89001917
- VLR No.: 009-0003

Significant dates
- Added to NRHP: December 19, 1990
- Designated VLR: August 15, 1989

Bellevue is a historic home located near Goode, Bedford County, Virginia. The main house was built in three phases between about 1824 and 1870. It is a two-story, five-bay, brick dwelling in the Federal style. It has a central hall plan, hipped roof, and two frame wings. Also on the property are a contributing school dormitory building known as Inkstand, as well as three dependencies, a garden, and a family cemetery. After the American Civil War, the house was altered to function as a high school for boys established by James Philemon Holcombe (1820–1873). It functioned into the late-19th century.

It was listed on the National Register of Historic Places in 1990. It is located in the Bellevue Rural Historic District.
