= Sarah N. Randolph =

19th century American historian and educator

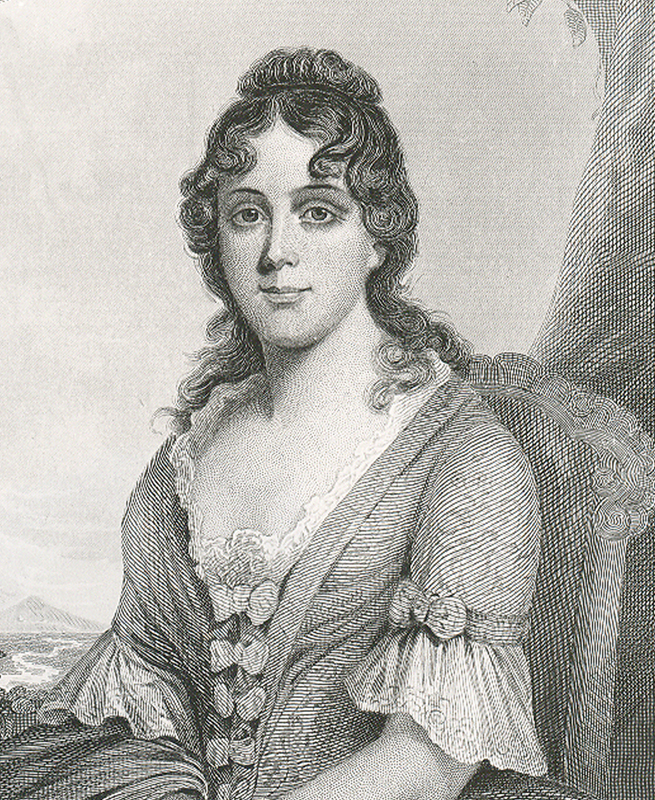
- Born: Sarah Nicholas Randolph; October 12, 1839; Edge Hill, Virginia, U.S.
- Died: April 25, 1892 (aged 52); Baltimore, Maryland, U.S.
- Occupations: Author and educator
- Notable work: The Domestic Life of Thomas Jefferson; The Life of General Thomas J. Jackson
- Parent(s): Thomas Jefferson Randolph; Jane Hollins Nicholas
- Relatives: Thomas Mann Randolph Jr. (paternal grandfather); Martha Jefferson Randolph (paternal grandmother); Thomas Jefferson (paternal great-grandfather); Martha Jefferson (paternal great-grandmother); Wilson Cary Nicholas (maternal grandfather)

Sarah Nicholas Randolph (October 12, 1839 – April 25, 1892) was an American educator, school principal, historian, and an author. She wrote The Domestic Life of Thomas Jefferson and The Life of General Thomas J. Jackson.

== Early life ==
Coat of Arms of William Randolph

Sarah Nicholas Randolph was born on October 12, 1839, at Edge Hill, Albemarle County, Virginia. She was the daughter of Jane Hollins Nicholas and Thomas Jefferson Randolph. Her great grandfather was Thomas Jefferson. Her father accepted the debts of Thomas Jefferson's estate, which greatly impaired his ability to support his family. He was a farmer and politician, drafting a bill for the gradual emancipation of enslaved people, before the American Civil War. It was not enacted. His financial circumstances worsened during the war.

== Educator ==
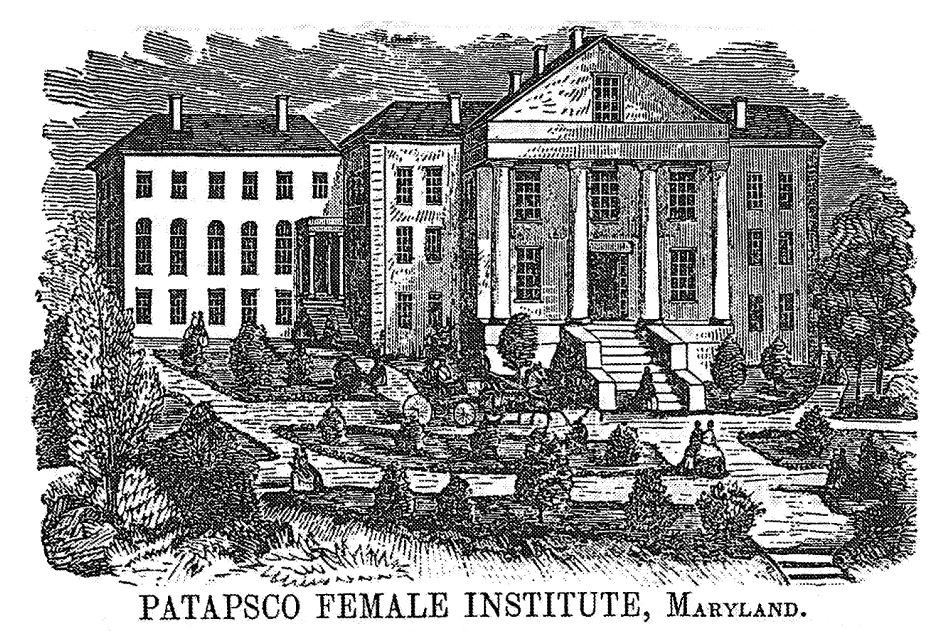
Patapsco Female Institute, 1857

Randolph, her mother, and her sisters, Carolina Wayles Randolph, Ellen Wayes Randolph Harrison, and Mary Buchanan Randolph ran the Edge Hill School for Girls. The school was established in 1836 by Jane Nicholas Randolph, Randolph's mother. In 1869, after her mother died and following the end of the American Civil War, the school was re-opened and managed by Randolph and her sister, Mary B. Randolph. As the school grew, a frame house on the estate was used for music and art classes. The school had a good reputation, known for its academic program as well as instilling character in the girls. In 1879, she moved to the Ellicott Mills, Maryland, area, where she was the principal of the Patapsco Institute. She established the Miss Randolph's School of Girls in Baltimore in 1884. She ran the school until her death. It was located at Eutaw Place and Lanvale Street. The school continued on after her death as The Sarah Randolph School, which was operated by the principal A. L. Armstrong.

== Historian and author ==
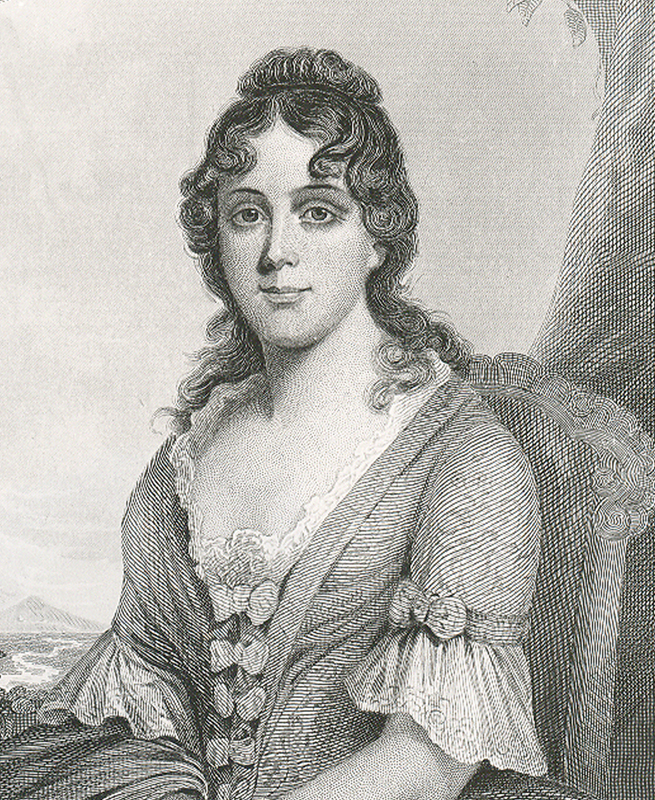
Martha Jefferson Randolph

She corresponded with Hugh Blair Grigsby, a historian, about details and accuracy of History of the Life and Times of James Madison by William C. Rives and John Smith's Pocahontas. Her letters to and from Grigsby were published in Letters of Sarah Nicholas Randolph to Hugh Blair Grigsby.

In 1870, her chapter about "Martha Jefferson Randolph", her grandmother, was published in Famous Women of the Revolution.

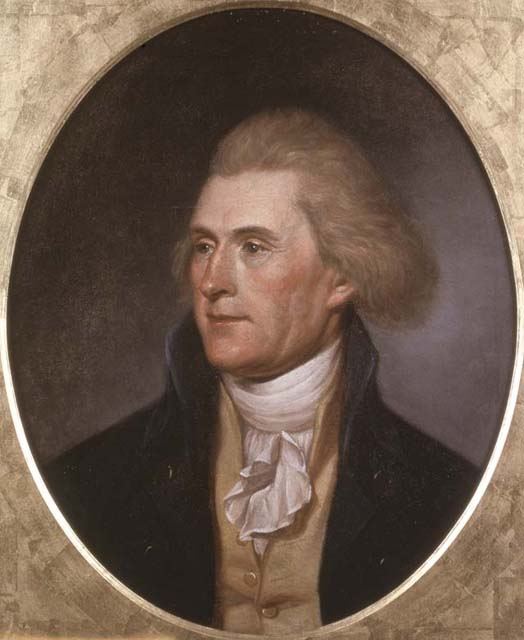
Thomas Jefferson, 1791

She wrote about her great grandfather in The Domestic Life of Thomas Jefferson: Compiled from Family Letters and Reminiscences that was published in 1871. It discusses the relationship between Thomas Jefferson Randolph and his maternal grandfather Thomas Jefferson. Historian Dumas Malone stated that "nobody has given a better picture of [Jefferson] as a family man than Sarah N. Randolph."

From this northern terrace the view is sublime; and here Jefferson and his company were accustomed to sit, bare-headed, in the summer until bed-time, having neither dew nor insects to annoy them. Here, perhaps, has been assembled more love of liberty, virtue, wisdom, and learning than any other private spot in America.

— Sarah N. Randolph, The Domestic Life of Thomas Jefferson

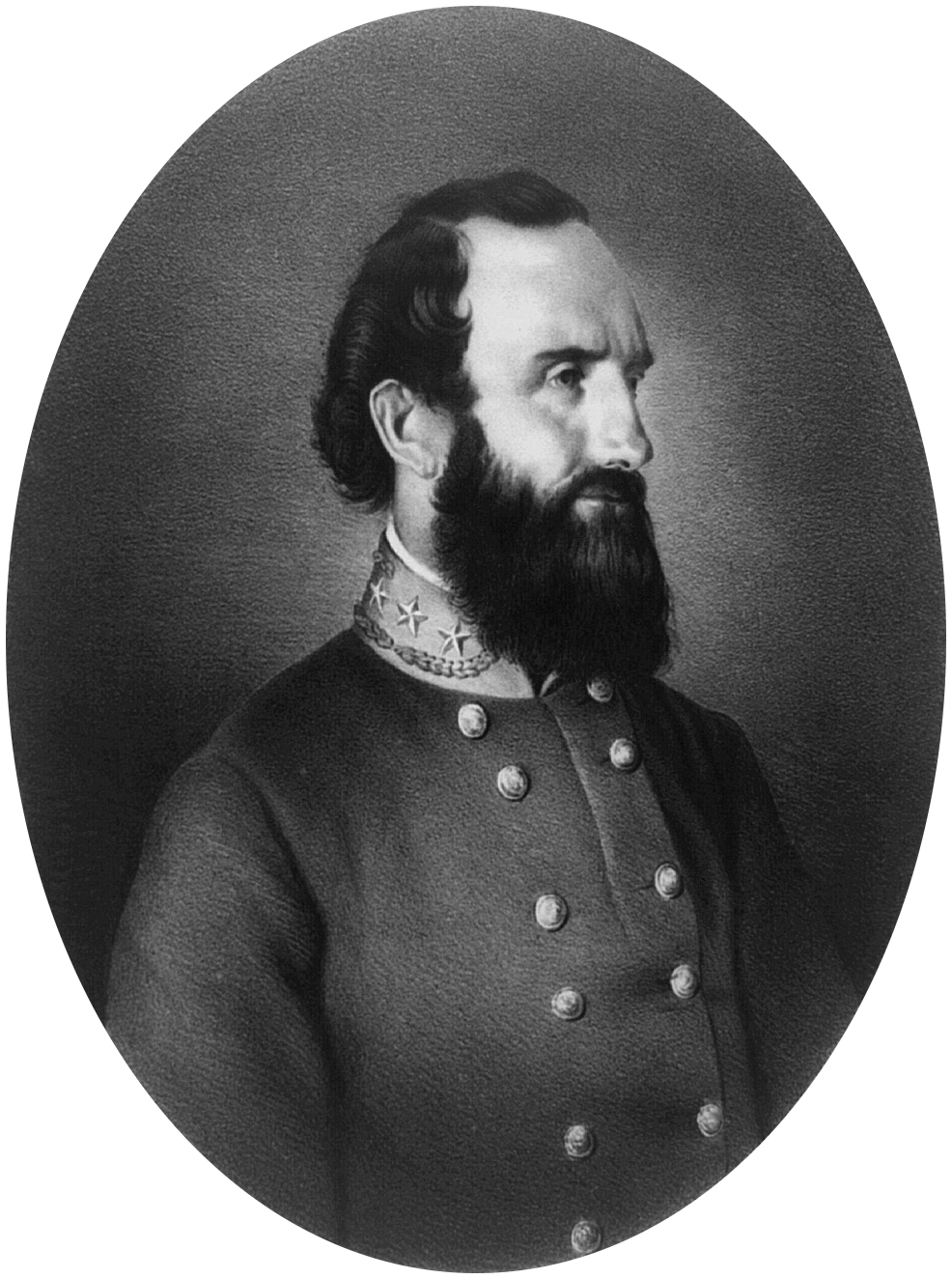
General Thomas J. "Stonewall" Jackson

Her work, The Lord Will Provide, was published in 1872. She also wrote The Life of General Thomas J. Jackson, who was also known as Stonewall Jackson. It was published in 1876. She found southern figures of the American Civil War "no less loved, no less honored, and no less brilliant … [Robert E.] Lee and [Stonewall] Jackson" than George Washington. In 1877, her work, "Mrs. Thomas Mann Randolph," was published in Worthy Women of Our First Century, which was edited by Mrs. O. J. Wister and Agnes Irwin. "The Kentucky Resolutions in a New Light" was published in The Nation on May 5, 1887.

She represented the Randolph and Nicholas families, as well as Thomas Jefferson, when people performing research. Randolph contributed to magazines. She helped establish monuments of Ulysses S. Grant and Robert E. Lee.

== Personal life and death ==
At some point she owned Underhill, a 500-acre tract and a house, near Edge Hill and Shadwell, Virginia. She was ill with consumption for several years, and spent the last several weeks of life in bedrest at her home. She died on April 25, 1892, in Baltimore, Maryland, and she was buried in the Monticello cemetery.
