= Bellevue Rural Historic District =

Historic district in Virginia, United States

- U.S. National Register of Historic Places
- U.S. Historic district
- Virginia Landmarks Register
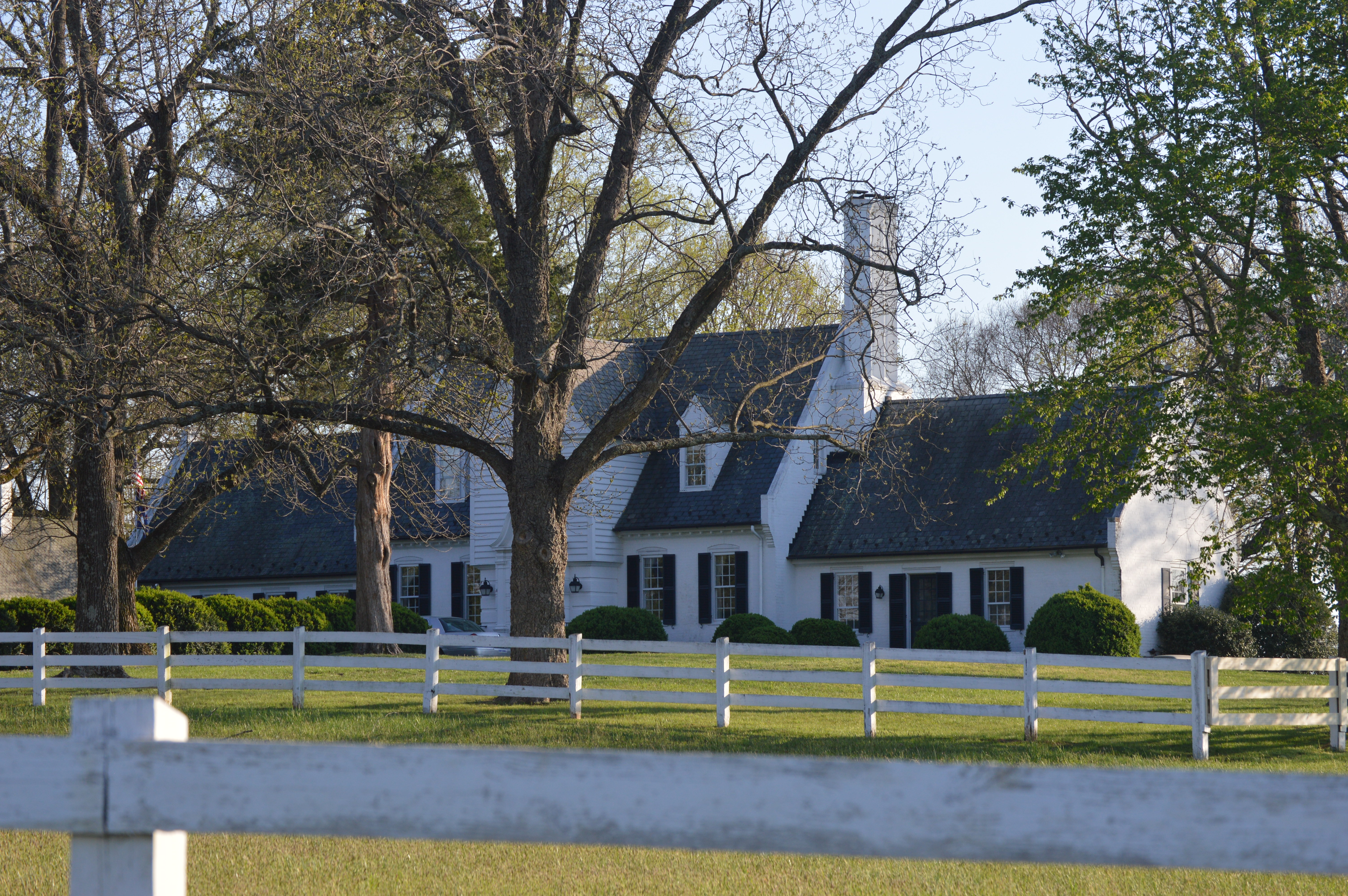
- Glenn Mary farmhouse

- Location within Virginia Location within the United States
- Location: Bellevue Rd., near Forest, Virginia
- Coordinates: 37°21′55″N 79°22′19″W
- Area: 411.2 acres (166.4 ha)
- Built: 1790
- Architectural style: Federal, Colonial, et al.
- NRHP reference No.: 05001345
- VLR No.: 009-5296

Significant dates
- Added to NRHP: November 30, 2005
- Designated VLR: October 14, 2005

Bellevue Rural Historic District is a national historic district located near Forest, Bedford County, Virginia. It encompasses seven contributing buildings, five contributing sites, and one contributing structure. They are associated with the Bellevue School for Boys, Trivium, Brook Hill Farm, and Glenn Mary Farm properties. Brook Hill Farm and Bellevue are also listed separately on the National Register of Historic Places.

It was listed on the National Register of Historic Places in 2005.
