= Tufton Farm =

Historic farm in Albemarle County, Virginia

Coordinates: 37°59′55″N 78°26′0″W

Tufton Farm, located in Albemarle County, Virginia, borders the Monticello plantation. The farm was passed down from Peter Jefferson to his son Thomas Jefferson, whose grandson Thomas Jefferson Randolph inherited the property. Thomas Jefferson experimented with plants and sustainable farming. It is now the site of the Thomas Jefferson Center for Historic Plants.

== History ==
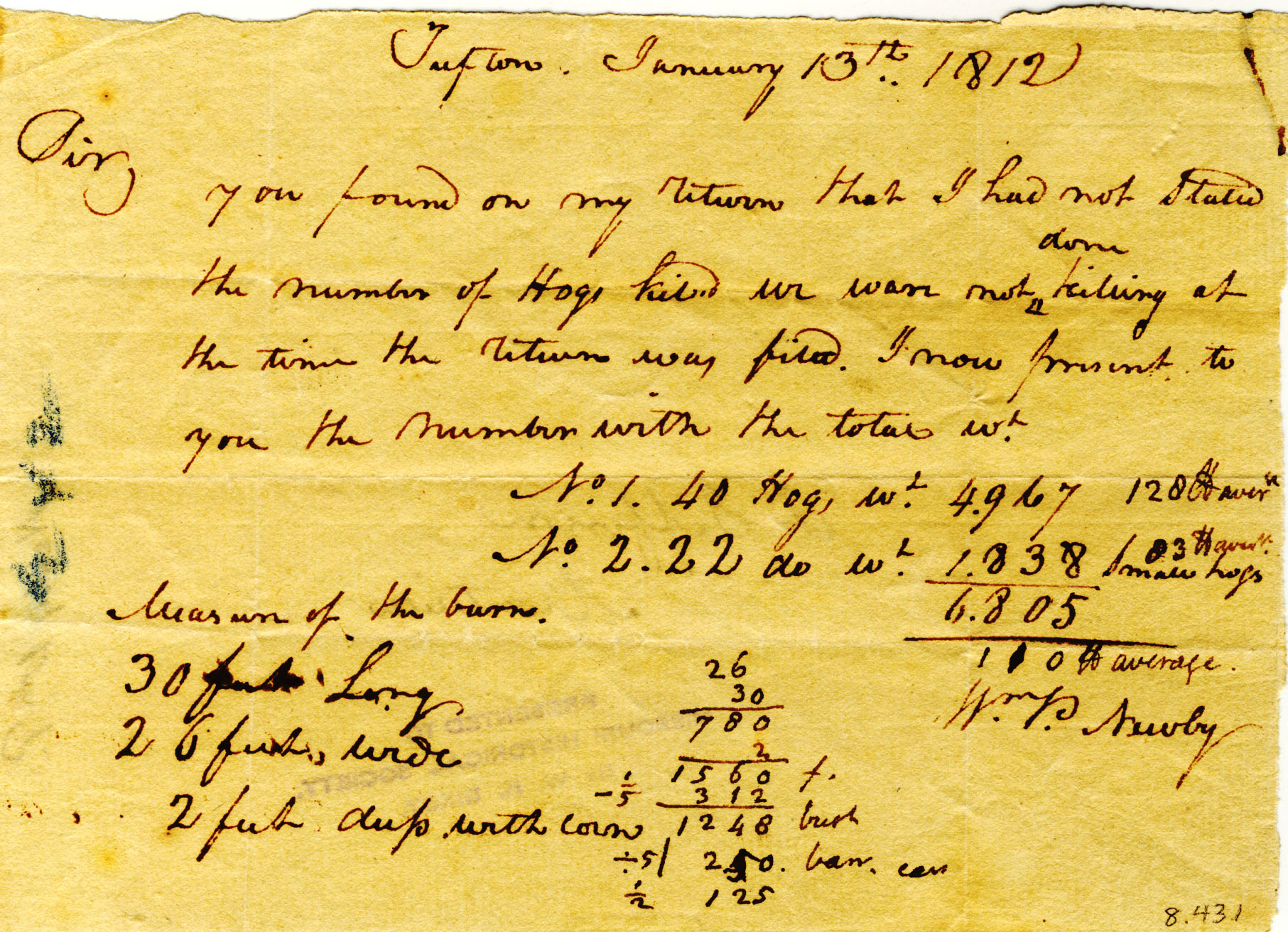
Note signed William P. Newby, Tufton, to Thomas Jefferson, Monticello, January 13, 1812

The land for the farm was patented in two separate tracts of 150 acres each by Peter Jefferson in 1740 and 1755. After he had the forest land cleared by enslaved people, he grew tobacco.

When he died, the property passed to his son, Thomas Jefferson. The farm was part of the original 5,000 acres that Jefferson owned. It was a quarter farm, located about 2 miles (3.2 km) from Monticello's main house gates. The property was named for Lady Caroline Tufton (Tufton, Pembrokeshire § Name) by Martha Jefferson Randolph, Tufton was her schoolmate in Paris. During Thomas Jefferson's lifetime, the farm's overseer lived in a clapboard-sheathed log cabin.

Jefferson primarily raised wheat. He also enjoyed novelties and experimented with plants from Africa and the Americas, rather than relying exclusively on cold season European vegetables. Jefferson's farm raised tomatoes, okra, peppers, eggplant, squash that are now common in the American diet. The farm provided corn, wheat, rye, and barley for the Monticello plantation. While he was president (1801–1809), Jefferson leased the farm to John Craven, who grew tobacco.

Jefferson's grandson, Thomas Jefferson Randolph, managed the farm beginning in 1817. That year, Randolph added a stone wing to the log cabin. (Note: Speth stated that Randolph built a stone house on the farm by 1825.) After January 1, 1818, Randolph leased Tufton Farm with its 31 enslaved farmer workers and stock. In 1826, following Jefferson's death, Randolph moved to Edge Hill. By 1833, Thomas P. Macon owned the farm and he built a four square stone house in front of and attached to the brick addition of the overseer's house. (Note: Thomas Macon is also said to have been Thomas Sheldon Macon.) Macon is believed to have grown wheat when he owned the farm.

The log cabin portion of the overseer's house was torn down about 1949. A brick terrace was built between the main house and Randolph's stone addition, the latter of which became a carpentry workshop. The farm was owned by Charles Granquist by 1984.

== Thomas Jefferson Center for Historic Plants ==
Tufton Farm is now owned by the Thomas Jefferson Foundation and is the site of the Thomas Jefferson Center for Historic Plants, which "collects, preserves, and distributes historic and native plant varieties." It produces the Twinleaf journal.

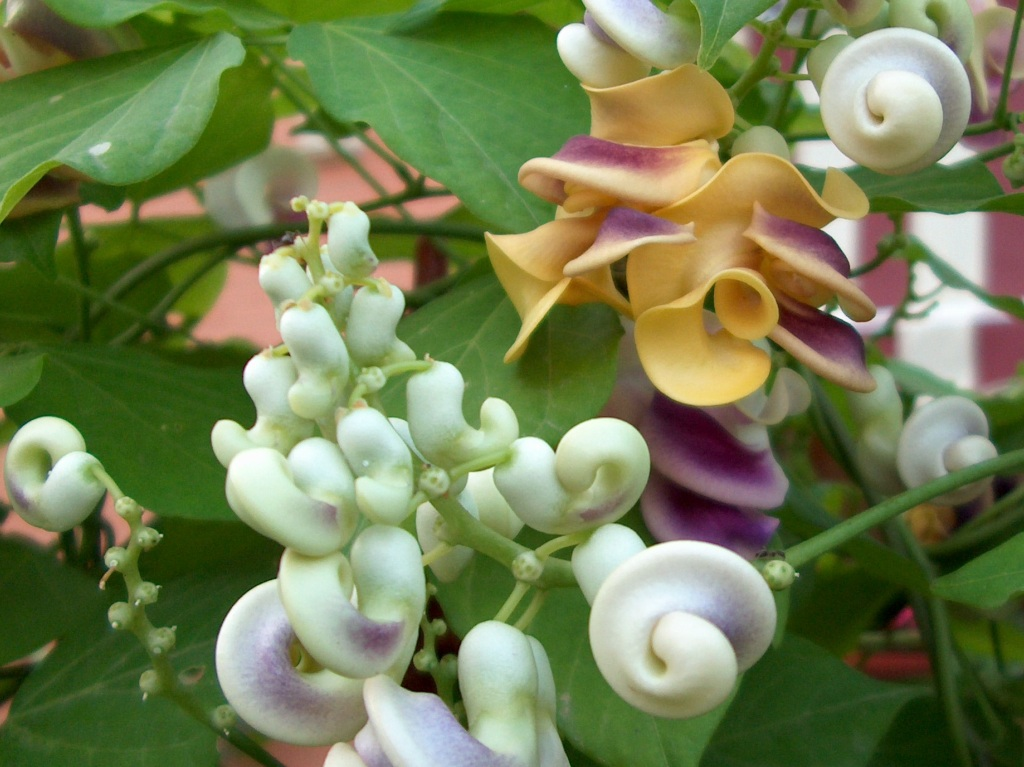
Snailflower

The 650-acre farm operates a one-acre organic vegetable garden that produces 39 varieties of vegetables. It supplies food for a Monticello cafe, an example of a farm-to-table operation. The garden raises corn, okra, lima beans, and eggplants. In addition to perennial and woody plants, like the snailflower, the farm's nursery produces heirloom seeds for flower and vegetable plants. The farm is also a prototype of sustainable agriculture, including 25 beehives with an estimated number of a million or more pollinating bees.

== See also ==
- John Rogers (Albemarle County, Virginia), an overseer of Monticello and co-founder of the Albemarle Agricultural Society, was known for his revolutionary agricultural reforms
