= Velasco Map =

Historical Map of exploration of North America

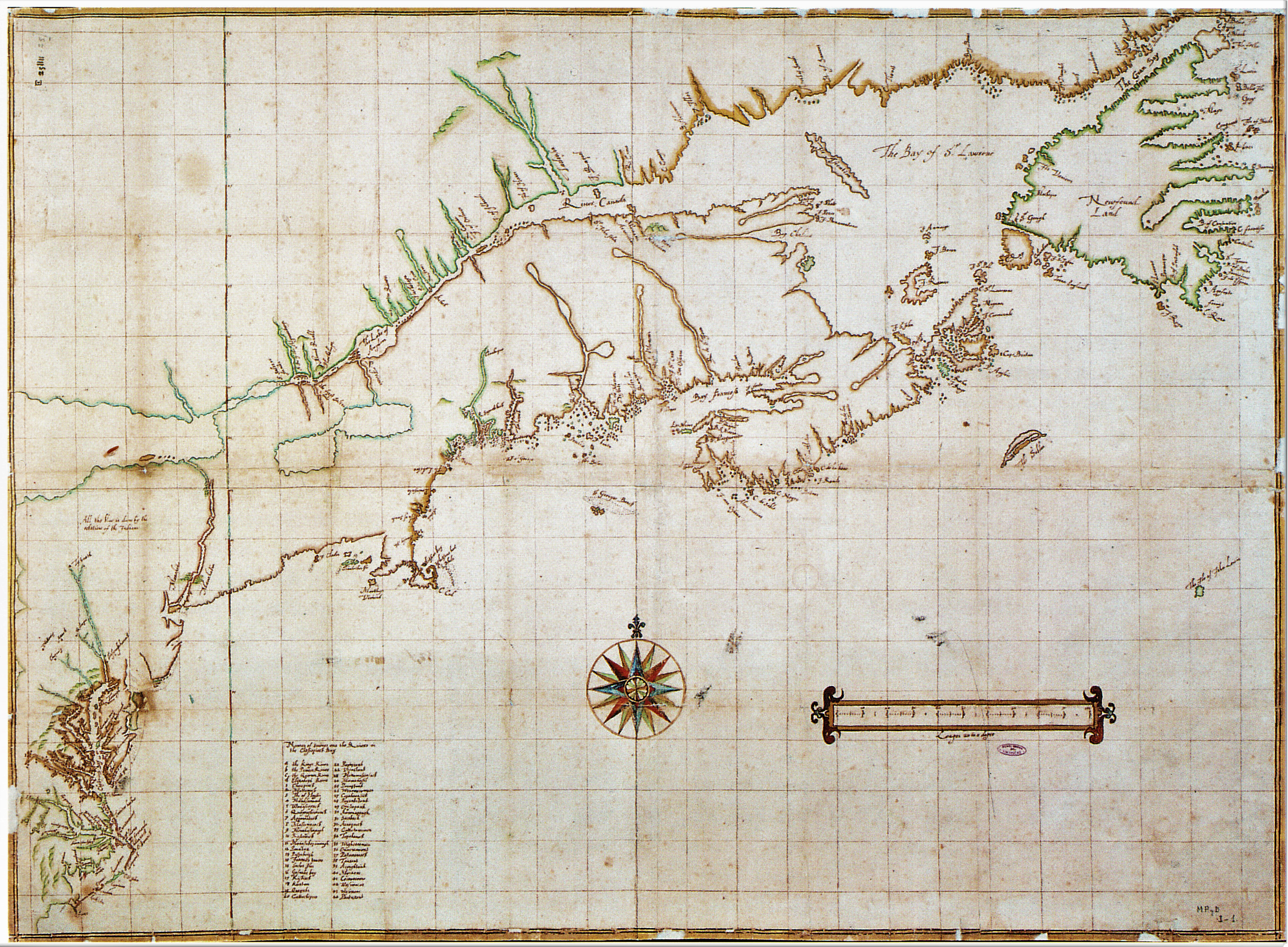
The Velasco Map, traditionally dated to c. 1610.

The Velasco Map (alternately referred to as the "Simancas map") is an early map of the Atlantic coast and interior of eastern North America, traditionally dated to about 1610. The map incorporates information associated with contemporary English, Dutch, and French exploration, including the Chesapeake Bay, the Hudson River, and inland portions of northeastern North America purportedly derived from native sources. It is notable for its depiction of the region shortly after Henry Hudson's 1609 voyage and for incorporating geographic information attributed to Indigenous sources.

The cartographer who compiled the map from various English surveys for king James I is unknown. The conventional name of the map is instead derived from Alonso de Velasco, the Spanish ambassador in London, who sent a copy of the original to King Philip III of Spain in 1611. The copy remained in the Simancas Archives in Spain until it was rediscovered by American historian Alexander Brown in 1887. Brown subsequently published a reproduction of the map in his 1890 work The Genesis of the United States.

The map is drawn on four sheets of paper pasted together, measuring approximately 81 by 111 centimeters. Its coastlines and waterways are delineated in several colors, principally yellow and green, with areas also rendered in reddish brown, brown, sepia, and blue; an inscription on the map states that features shown in blue were derived from information provided by Indigenous peoples.

Several notable features are found on the map in respect to its time. These include the names "Manahata" and "Manahatin" near the mouth of the Hudson River, an early appearance after being noted in the logs from Hudson's expedition.. The pressence of Lake Ontario which isn't named but noted in blue indicating it was derived from native sources, would have been unexplored by Europeans at the time.

The map's unusually extensive and advanced geographic detail has led later historians and scholars to question its authenticity and suggest that the surviving document put forth by Brown could be a mis-identification of the original or a later reconstruction or possibly a forgery.
