= Oak Ridge, Nelson County, Virginia =

Unincorporated community in Virginia, US

Coordinates: 37°42′33″N 78°52′36″W

Oak Ridge is an unincorporated community in Nelson County, Virginia, United States.
