= James Philemon Holcombe =

American politician (1820–1873)

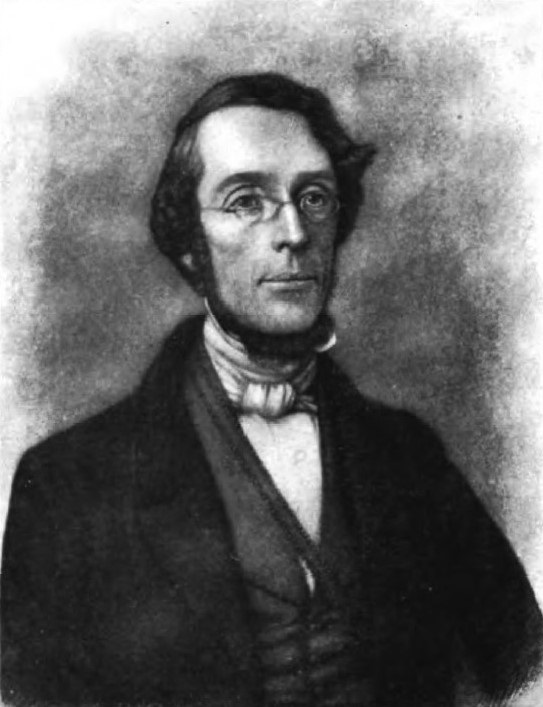
- Born: September 20, 1820; Powhatan County, Virginia
- Died: August 22, 1873 (aged 52); Capon Springs, West Virginia
- Education: Yale University; University of Virginia Law School
- Spouse: Ann Selden Watts Holcombe
- Children: 5

James Philemon Holcombe (September 20, 1820 – August 22, 1873) was an American law professor, legal author and Confederate politician and diplomat.

== Early life ==
James Holcombe was born in Powhatan County, Virginia, and raised in Lynchburg. He graduated from Yale University and earned a law degree from the University of Virginia Law School.

== Career ==
=== Legal career ===
Holcombe practiced law in Ohio including with partner William Y. Gholson, an anti-slavery advocate, and later was a professor of law at the University of Virginia. He authored several important legal treatises, including An Introduction to Equity Jurisprudence.

=== Views on slavery ===
Although his parents freed their slaves and later moved to Indiana, Holcombe spoke widely in favor of slavery. He delivered an address "Is Slavery Consistent With Natural Law?" in 1858 on slavery's consistency with natural law. Holcombe had a political theory based on ideas of hierarchy, which explicitly reversed Jefferson's theme from the Declaration of Independence that all people are created equal. He thought people were naturally unequal and that was his primary argument for slavery. This theme was also developed by Holcombe's UVA colleague Albert Taylor Bledsoe and George Frederick Holmes. Holcombe's other public addresses include an address to the Virginia Historical Society on the American Revolution and an 1853 address to the University of Virginia alumni on the importance of education and slavery. During the secession crisis, Professor Holcombe delivered a speech to the voters of Albemarle County and then advocated secession in Richmond's Secession Convention's debates in March 1861.

=== American Civil War ===
During the War, Holcombe represented his district in the First Confederate Congress. He then served as the Confederate Commissioner to Canada. Holcombe did not return to The university after the American Civil War, but established a high school for boys at Bellevue near Goode, Virginia, in Bedford County, Virginia. It functioned into the early-20th century, around 1909.

== Death ==
Holcombe died on August 22, 1873, in Capon Springs, West Virginia. He is buried at Presbyterian Cemetery in Lynchburg, Virginia.
