= Goode, Virginia =

Unincorporated community in Virginia, United States

- Unincorporated community
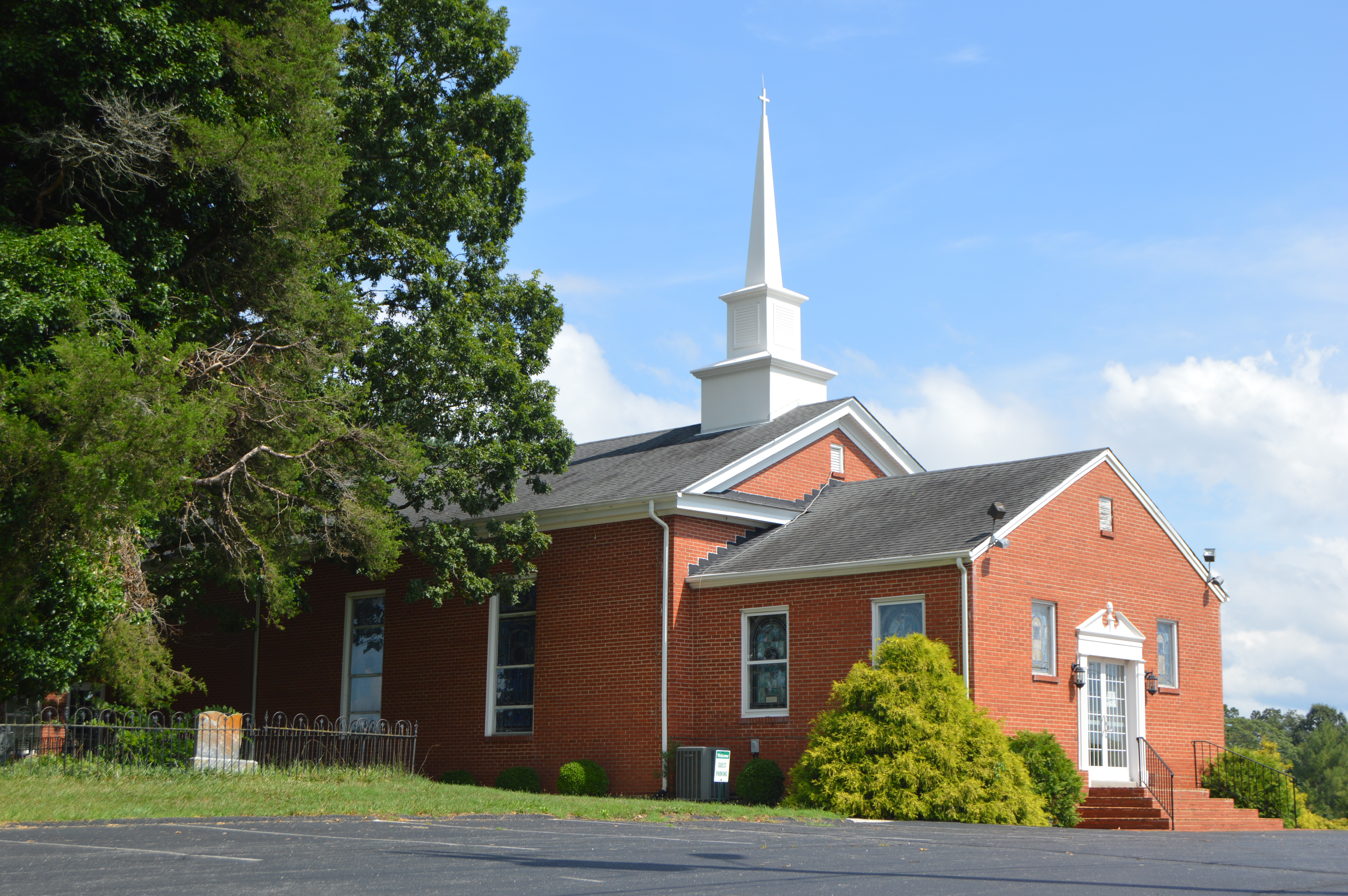
- Oakland United Methodist Church on Goode Station Road

- Location within Virginia Location within the United States
- Coordinates: 37°21′32″N 79°23′30″W
- Country: United States
- State: Virginia
- County: Bedford
- Elevation: 797 ft (243 m)
- Time zone: UTC-5 (Eastern (EST))
  - Summer (DST): UTC-4 (EDT)
- ZIP Code: 24556
- Area codes: 540 and 826

Goode is an unincorporated community in eastern Bedford County, Virginia, United States. The community lies along U.S. Route 221 between Bedford and Forest. It is part of the Lynchburg Metropolitan Statistical Area.

== History ==
Its name honors John Goode, a Virginia politician.

Bellevue was listed on the National Register of Historic Places in 1990.

== Geography ==
The community is largely made up of rolling hills, farmlands, and views of the Blue Ridge Mountains. The Big Otter River crosses through the community.

== Demographics ==
As of the census of 2020, there were 3,357 people residing in the Goode ZIP Code area.

== Education ==
The community is served by Bedford County Public Schools. Public school students residing in Goode are zoned to attend Otter River Elementary School, Forest Middle School, and Jefferson Forest High School.

The closest higher education institutions to the community are located in Bedford and Lynchburg.

== Government ==
The United States Postal Service operates the Goode Post Office within the community. Its ZIP Code is 24556.

== Infrastructure ==
The Bedford Regional Water Authority maintains a public water system in the community.

=== Public safety ===
Law enforcement is provided by the Bedford County Sheriff's Office. Fire protection is provided by the Bedford Fire Department and Forest Volunteer Fire Company. Emergency medical services are provided by the Bedford County Department of Fire and Rescue, which operates from a station within the community.

=== Transportation ===
==== Air ====
The New London Airport is the closest public-use airport to the community. The Lynchburg Regional Airport is the closest airport with commercial service to the community.

==== Road ====
- U.S. Route 221 (Forest Road)

==== Rail ====
The Norfolk Southern Blue Ridge District runs through the community. The closest passenger rail service is located in Lynchburg.
