= List of slaves =

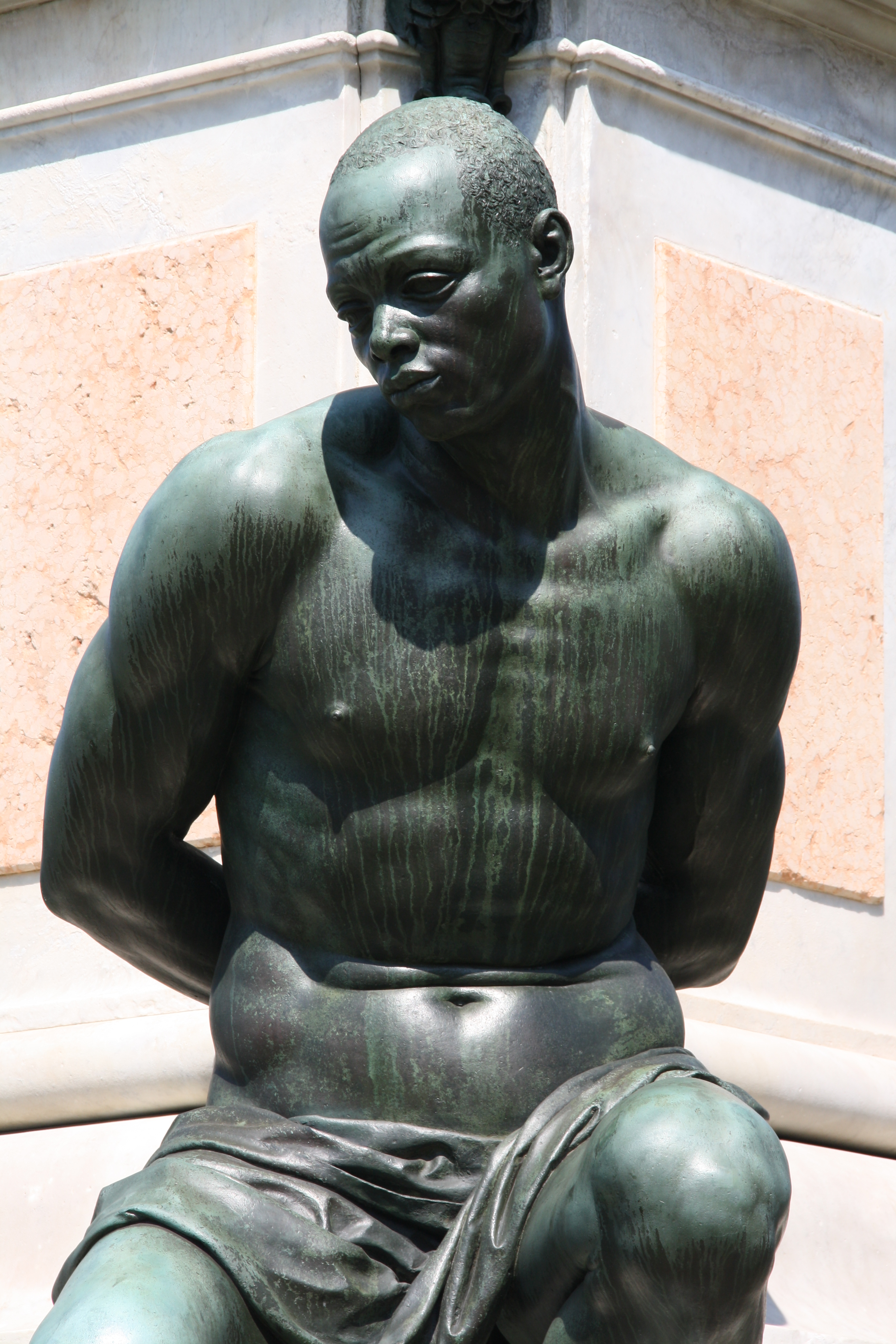
One of four statues of chained slaves at the base of the Monument of the Four Moors in Livorno, Italy, whose models may have been actual slaves

Slavery is a social-economic system under which people are enslaved: deprived of personal freedom and forced to perform labor or services without compensation. These people are referred as enslaved people.

The following is a list of notable historical people who were enslaved at some point during their lives, in alphabetical order by first name.

== A ==
- Abraham, an enslaved black man who carried messages between the frontier and Charles Town during wars with the Cherokee, for which he was freed.
- Abdul Rahman Ibrahima Sori (1762–1829), Fula prince enslaved in the United States for 40 years until President John Quincy Adams freed him.

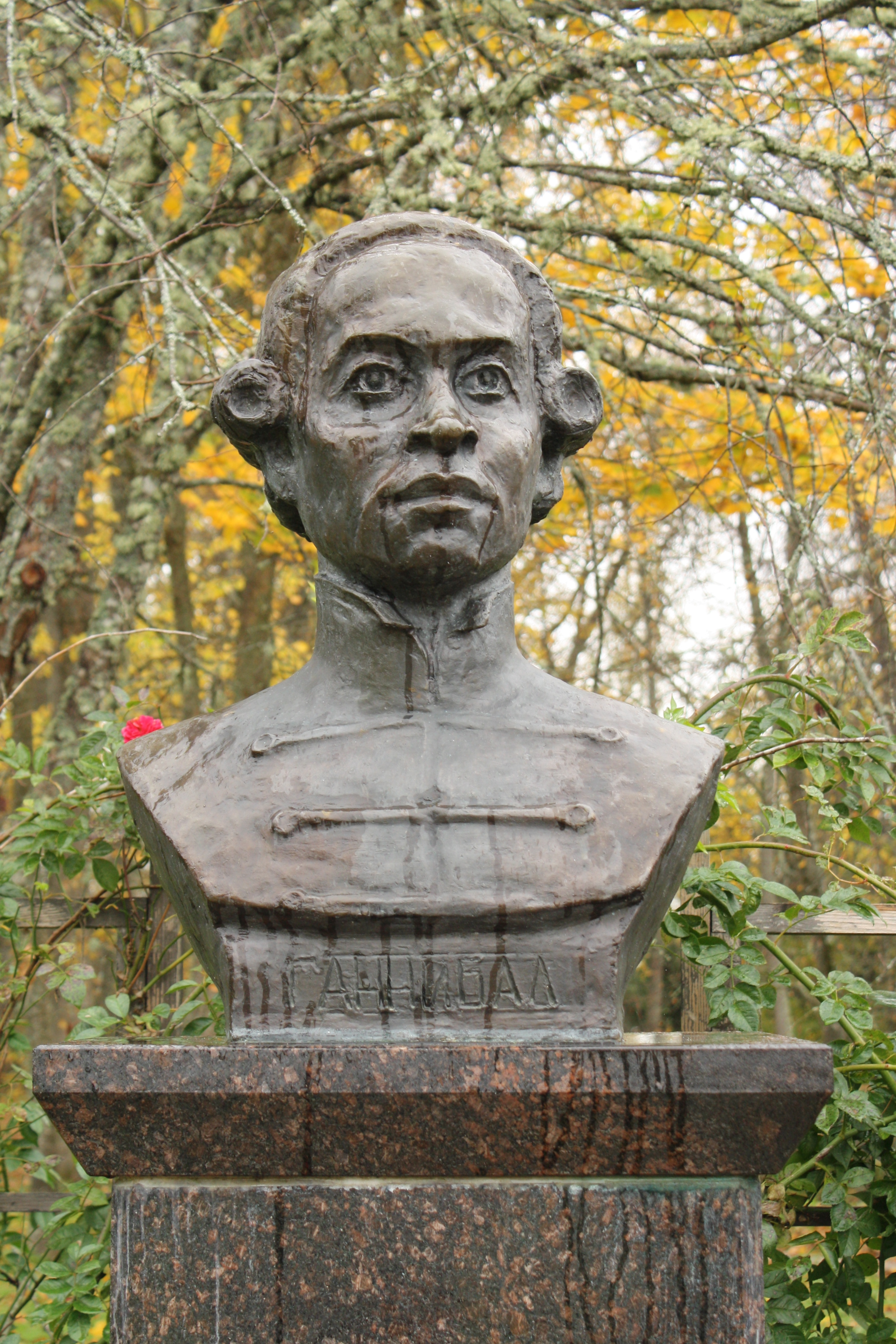
Abram Petrovich Gannibal

- Abram Petrovich Gannibal (c. 1696–1781), an enslaved African in the Ottoman Empire, later adopted by Russian czar Peter the Great, governor of Tallinn (Reval) (1742–1752), general-en-chef (1759–1762) for building of sea forts and canals in Russia; great-grandfather of Alexander Pushkin.
- Absalom Jones (1746–1818), formerly-enslaved African-American man who purchased his freedom, abolitionist and clergyman – first ordained black priest of the Episcopal Church.
- Abu Lu'lu'a Firuz (died 644), Persian craftsman and captive who killed the second Islamic caliph Umar ibn al-Khattab (r. 634–644).
- Addas (7th century) an enslaved Christian boy who lived in Taif during the time of Muhammad, who was supposedly the first person from the western province of Taif to convert to Islam.
- Adriaan de Bruin (c. 1700–1766), earlier called Tabo Jansz, was an enslaved servant in the Dutch Republic who ended up a free man in Hoorn, North Holland. He was portrayed by Nicolaas Verkolje.
- Adam Brzeziński (1768 – after 1797), Polish serf and Royal Ballet Dancer, donated to the king of Poland by will and testament.

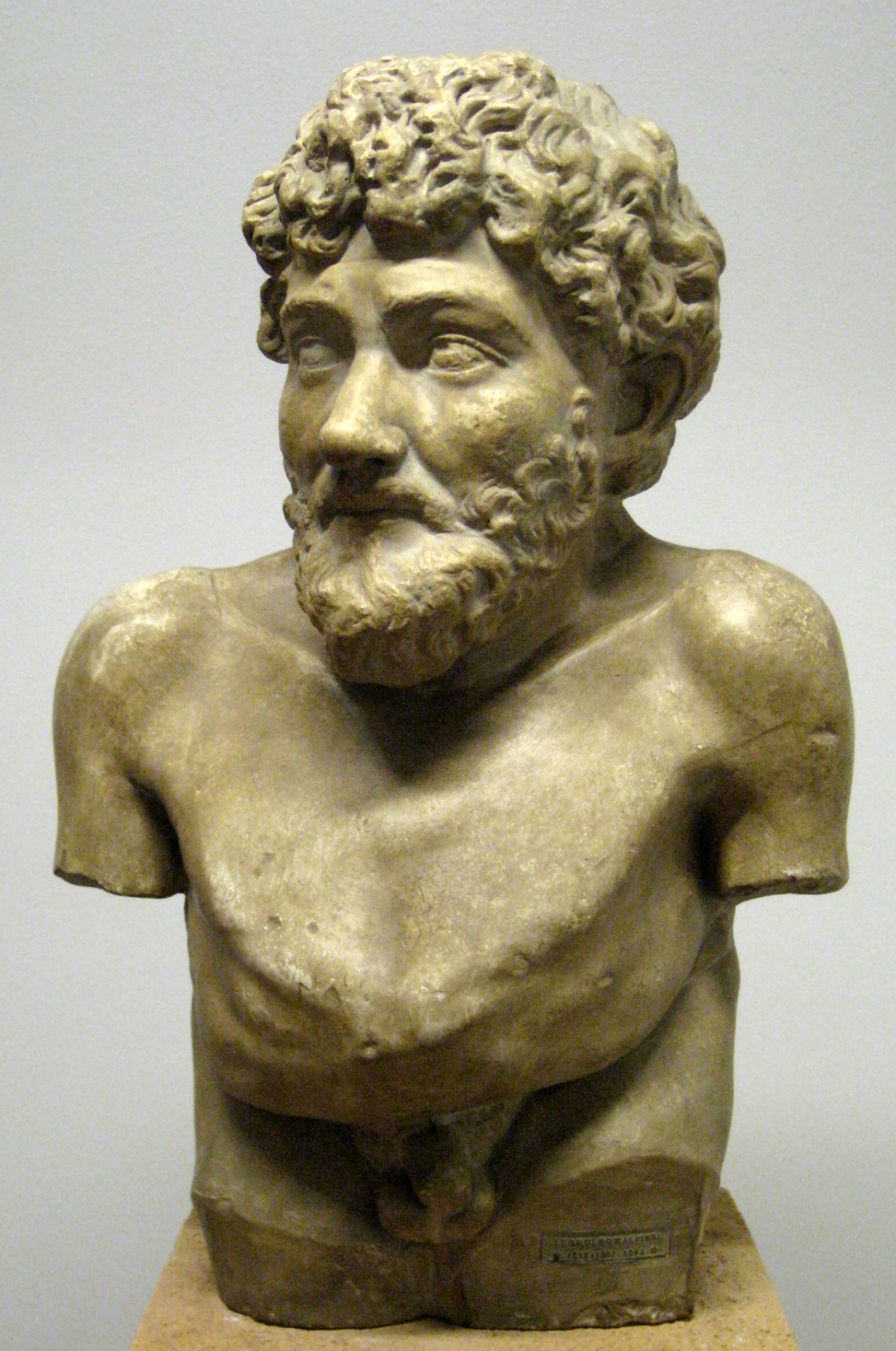
Aesop

- Aesop (c. 620–564 BCE), Greek poet and author or transcriber of Aesop's Fables.
- Afanasy Grigoriev (1782–1868), Russian serf and Neoclassical architect.
- Afrosinya (1699/1700–1748), Russian serf, possibly a Finnish captive, enslaved mistress of Alexei Petrovich, Tsarevich of Russia.
- Agathoclia (died c. 230), a martyr and patron saint of the town of Mequinenza in Spain.
- Alam al-Malika (died 1130), enslaved singer who was promoted to become the de facto prime minister, adviser and ruler of the principality of Zubayd, in what is now Yemen.
- Alexina Morrison (born c. 1842), a fugitive from slavery in Louisiana who claimed to be a kidnapped white girl and sued her master for her freedom on that ground, arousing such popular feeling against him that a mob threatened to lynch him.
- Alfred "Teen" Blackburn (1842–1951), one of the last living survivors of slavery in the United States who had a clear recollection of it.
- Alfred Jackson (c. 1812–1901), formerly enslaved wagoner of Seventh U.S. President Andrew Jackson who became an early tour guide at Jackson's former plantation, The Hermitage.
- Alfred Francis Russell (1817–1884), 10th President of Liberia.
- Alice Clifton (c. 1772–unknown), as an enslaved teenager, she was a defendant in an infanticide trial in 1787.

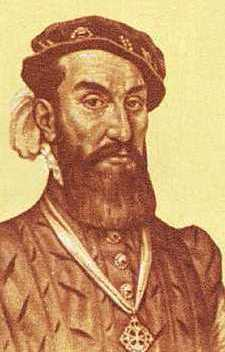
Álvar Núñez Cabeza de Vaca

- Álvar Núñez Cabeza de Vaca (c. 1490–c. 1558), a Spanish explorer who was enslaved by Native Americans on the Gulf Coast of what is now the United States after surviving the collapse of the Narváez expedition in 1527.
- Al-Khayzuran bint Atta (died 789), an enslaved Yemenite girl who became the wife of the Abbasid Caliph Al-Mahdi and mother of both Caliphs Al-Hadi and Harun al-Rashid, the most famous of the Abbasids.
- Alp-Tegin (died 963), a member of the nomadic Turks of Central Asian steppes who was brought as an enslaved child into the Samanid court at their capital Bukhara and who rose to become a commander of the army of the Samanid Empire in Khorasan. He later became the governor of Ghazna which then fell under the Samanid Empire. Later his son-in-law Sabuktigin would found the Ghaznavid Empire.
- Amanda America Dickson (1849–1893), the daughter of white Georgian planter David Dickson and Julia Frances Lewis, who was enslaved by Dickson's mother. Although legally enslaved until her emancipation after the American Civil War, Amanda Dickson was raised as her father's favorite and inherited his $500,000 estate after his 1885 death.
- Ammar bin Yasir (570–657), one of the most famous sahaba (companions of the Islamic prophet Muhammad) freed by Abu Bakr.
- Amos Fortune (1710–1801), an African prince who was enslaved in the United States for most of his life. A children's book about him, Amos Fortune, Free Man won the Newbery Medal in 1951.
- Anarcha Westcott (c. 1828–unknown), a black woman enslaved in the United States who was one of the several enslaved women experimented on by J. Marion Sims.

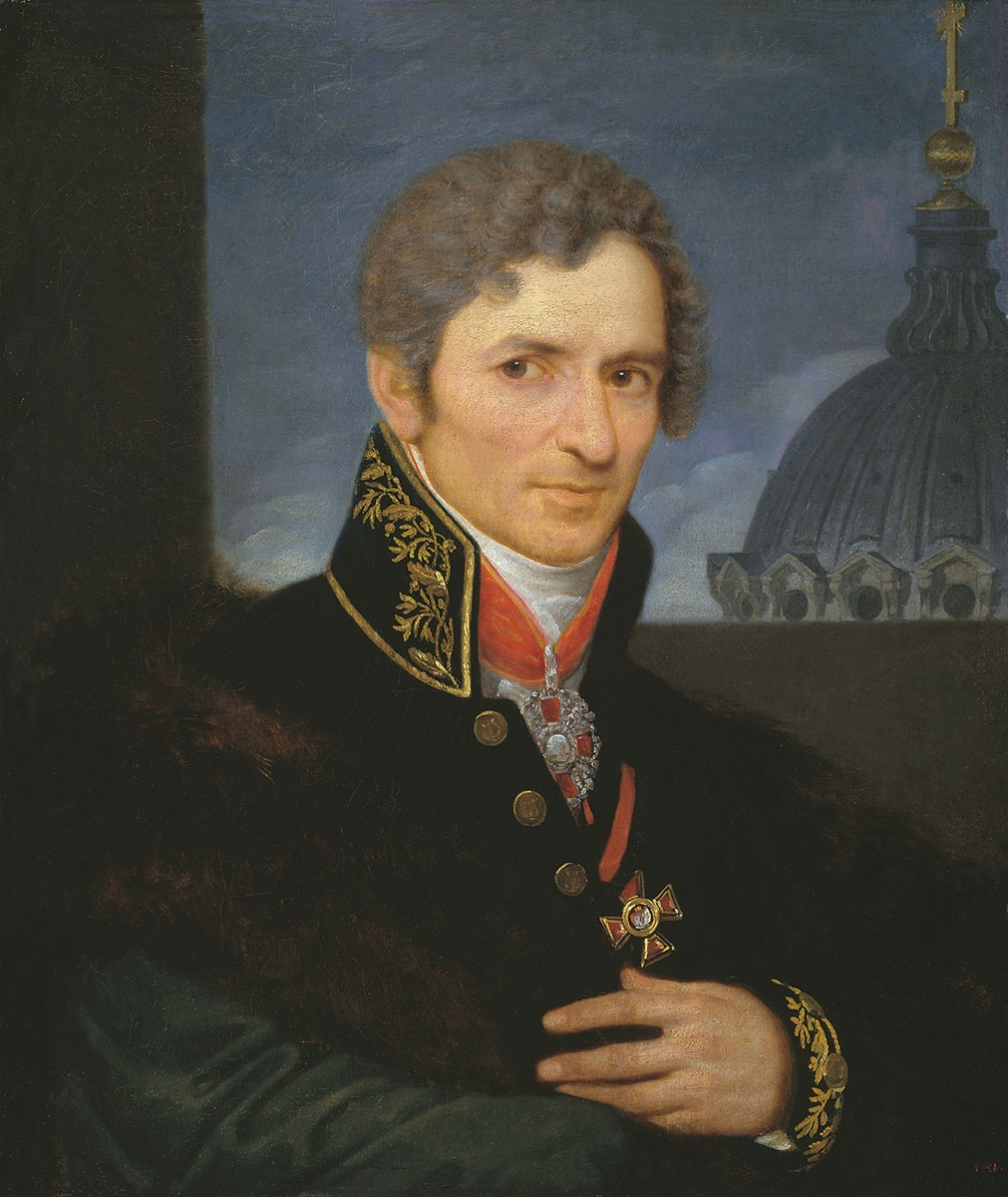
Andrey Voronikhin

- Andrey Voronikhin (1759–1814), Russian serf, architect and painter.
- Andrea Aguyar (died 1849), a formerly-enslaved freed black man from Uruguay who joined Giuseppe Garibaldi during Italian revolutionary involvement in the Uruguayan Civil War of the 1840s and was killed fighting in defense of the Roman Republic of 1849.
- Andrew Jackson Beard (1849–1921), inventor, emancipated at age 15 by the Emancipation Proclamation.
- Anna J. Cooper (1858–1964), author, educator, speaker and prominent African-American scholar.
- Anna Madgigine Jai Kingsley (1793–1870), enslaved woman and then a planter and enslaver herself.
- Anna Williams, an enslaved woman in Washington, D.C. who successfully sued the United States Court of Appeals for the DC Circuit for her freedom.
- Annice (died 1828), executed for the murders of five children.
- Annika Svahn (fl. 1714), Finnish woman abducted by the Russians during the Great Northern War. The daughter of a vicar in Joutseno, she became perhaps the best-known victim of the abuse suffered by the civilian population in Finland during the Russian occupation Greater Wrath.
- Antarah ibn Shaddad (525–608), pre-Islamic Arab born to an enslaved woman, freed by his father on the eve of battle, also a poet.
- Anthony Burns (1834–1862), a Baptist preacher who escaped slavery to Boston only to be recaptured due to the Fugitive Slave Act of 1850, then had his freedom bought by those who opposed his recapture in Boston.
- Antonia Bonnelli (1786–1870), captured and enslaved by the Mikasuki tribe in Florida in 1802.
- António Corea, European name given to a Korean. He was taken to Italy, which made him possibly the first Korean person to set foot in Europe.
- Antón Guanche (15th century), a Guanche from Tenerife, captured, enslaved, and returned to the island.
- Aqualtune Ezgondidu Mahamud da Silva Santos (died 1677), princess of Kongo, mother of Ganga Zumba and grandmother of Zumbi dos Palmares. She led 10,000 men during the Battle of Mbwila between Kingdom of Kongo and Kingdom of Portugal. She was captured by Portuguese forces, was brought to Brazil and sold into slavery. She created the slave settlement of Quilombo dos Palmares with her son Ganga Zumba.
- Archer Alexander (1810–1879), the model for the enslaved man in the 1876 Emancipation Memorial sculpture.
- Archibald Grimké (1849–1930), born into slavery, the son of a white father, became an American lawyer, intellectual, journalist, diplomat and community leader.
- Arthur Crumpler (c. 1835–1910), escaped slavery in Virginia, second husband of Dr. Rebecca Davis Lee Crumpler.
- Aster Ganno (c. 1872–1964), a young Ethiopian woman was rescued by the Italian Navy from a slave ship crossing to Yemen. She went on to translate the Bible into the Oromo language. Also she prepared literacy materials and went on to spend the rest of her life as a school teacher.
- Augustine Tolton (1854–1897), the first black priest in the United States.
- Aurelia Philematium, a freedwoman whose tombstone glorifies her marriage with her fellow freedman, Lucius Aurelius Hermia.

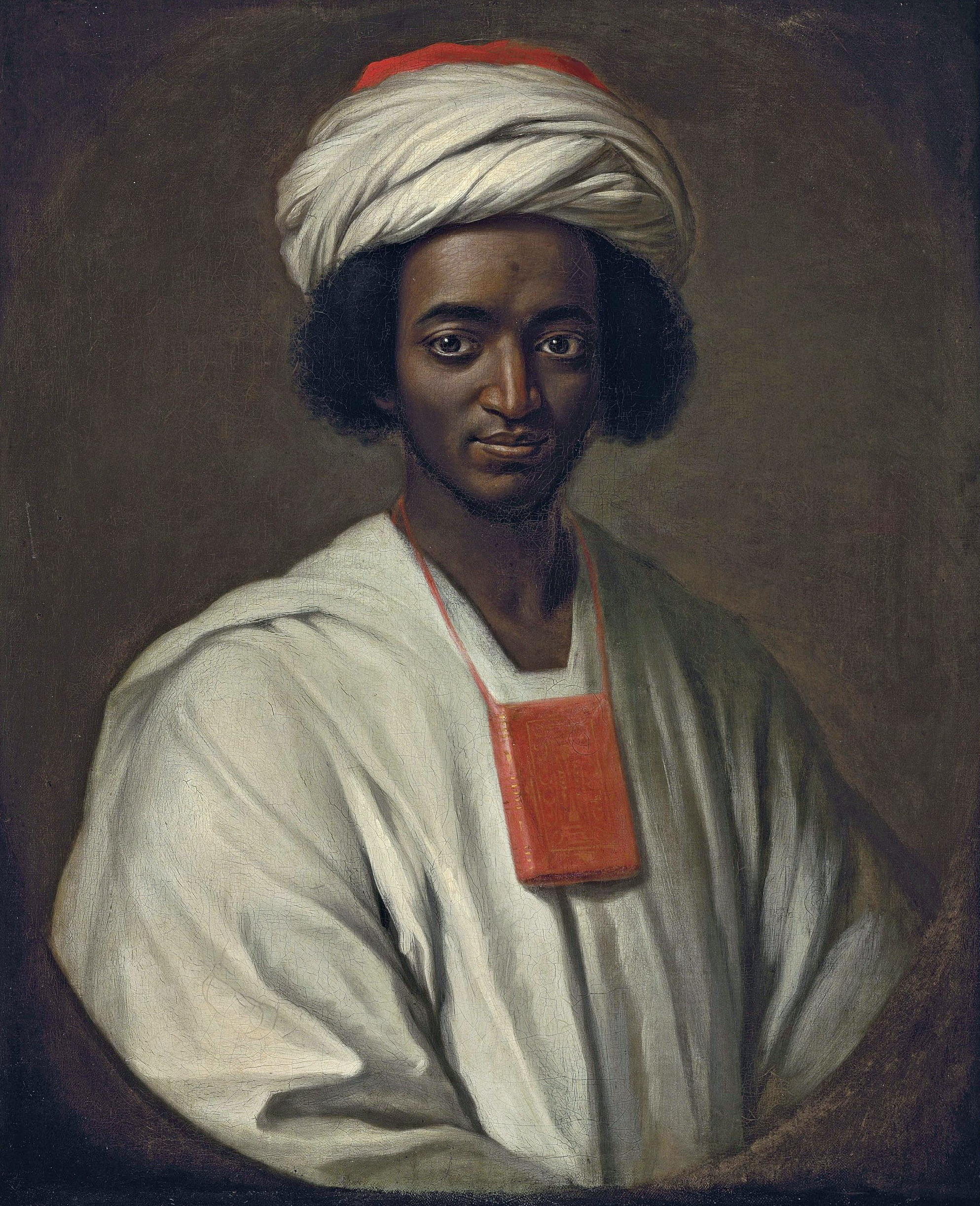
Ayuba Suleiman Diallo

- Ayuba Suleiman Diallo (1701–1773), also known as Job ben Solomon, a Muslim of the Bundu state in West Africa who was enslaved for two years in Maryland, freed in 1734, and later wrote memoirs that were published as one of the earliest slave narratives.

== B ==
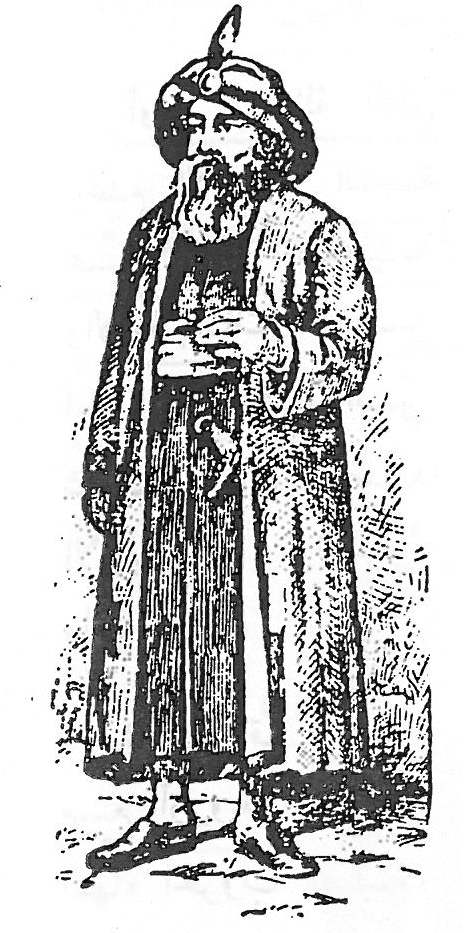
Baibars

- Baibars (1223–1277), also known as Abu al-Futuh, a Kipchak Turk who became a Mamluk sultan of Egypt and Syria.
- Balthild (c. 626–680), an Anglo-Saxon woman of elite birth who was sold into slavery as a young girl and served in the household of Erchinoald, mayor of the palace of Neustria. Later she became queen consort by marriage to Clovis II, and then regent during the minority of her son Clotaire. She abolished the practice of trading enslaved Christian and sought the freedom of children sold into slavery. She was canonized by Pope Nicholas I about 200 years after her death.
- Bass Reeves (1838–1910), one of the first black Deputy U.S. Marshals west of the Mississippi River, credited with arresting over 3,000 felons as well as shooting and killing fourteen outlaws in self-defense.

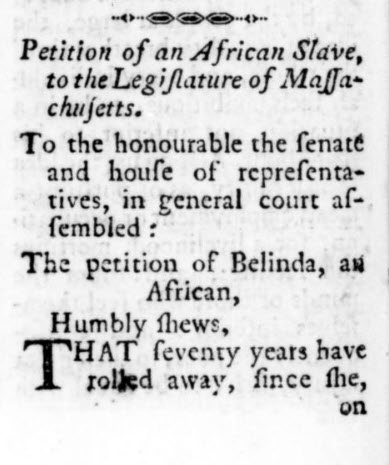
Belinda Sutton's petition, reprinted

- Belinda Sutton (1713–179?), born in Ghana, petitioned for support from her enslaver's estate, considered an early reparations case and inspired future activism.
- Bell (Belinda) (c. 1750–c. 1772), born in Bengal, she was brought to Scotland in the service of an East India Company nabob. Accused of infanticide, she petitioned to be banished and was indentured as a "slave for life" and transported to Virginia in 1772. She was the last person to be deemed a slave in a British court.
- Benjamin S. Turner (1825–1894), formerly enslaved politician who represented Alabama's 1st congressional district in the United States House of Representatives becoming the first African American to represent the state in Congress.
- Benkos Biohó, born into the royal family of the Bissagos Islands, who was abducted and enslaved. After transportation to Spanish New Granada in South America he managed to escape, help many other enslaved people to escape and established the maroon community of San Basilio de Palenque. He was betrayed and hanged by Governor Diego Pacheco Téllez-Girón Gómez de Sandoval of Cartagena in 1621, but the community he founded survived in freedom and exists up to the present.
- Betty Hemings (c. 1735–1807), an enslaved mixed-race woman in colonial Virginia whom in 1761 became the sex slave of her master, planter John Wayles, and had six mixed-race children with him over a 12-year period, including Sally Hemings and James Hemings.
- Big Eyes (fl. 1540), Wichita woman enslaved by Tejas people before being captured and enslaved by conquistador Juan de Zaldívar.
- Bilichild (died 610), was a queen of Austrasia by marriage to Theudebert II.
- Bilal ibn Ribah (580–640), freed in the 6th century. He converted to Islam and was Muhammad's muezzin.
- Bill Richmond (1763–1829), born in America, was freed and became one of England's best-known boxers.
- Billy (born c. 1754), a man who escaped John Tayloe II's plantation and was charged with treason against Virginia during the American Revolutionary War. He was pardoned after arguing that, as an enslaved man, he was not a citizen and thus could not commit treason against a government to which he owed no allegiance.
- Bissula (fl. 368) enslaved Alemannic woman, and muse of the Roman poet Ausonius.
- Blanche Bruce (1841–1898) first and only former enslaved person to have served in the United States Senate.
- Blandina (c. 162–177), an enslaved Christian martyr in Roman Gaul.
- The Bodmin manumissions, a manuscript now in the British Library preserves the names and details of the enslaved freed in Bodmin (the then-principal town of Cornwall) during the 9th or 10th centuries.
- Booker T. Washington (1856–1915), born into slavery, became an American educator, author and leader of the African-American community after the Civil War.
- Boston Jersey (born 1736 or 1737), enslaved by British naval officier Paul Henry Ourry, he served in the crews of three ships of the Royal Navy.

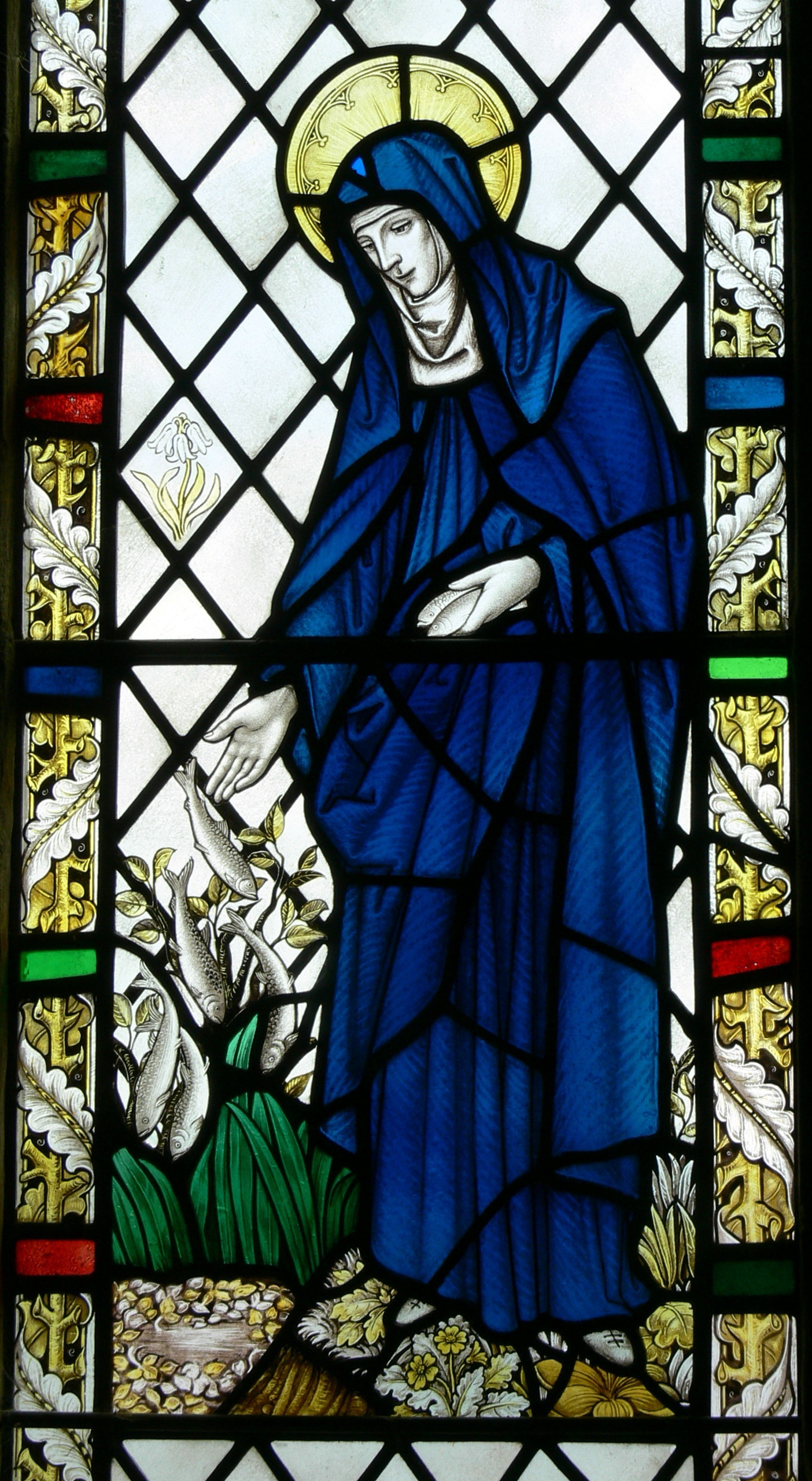
Brigid of Kildare

- Brigid of Kildare, a major Irish Saint. According to tradition, Brigid was born in the year 451 AD in Faughart, just north of Dundalk in County Louth, Ireland. Her mother was Brocca, an enslaved Christian Pict who had been baptized by Saint Patrick. They name her father as Dubhthach, a chieftain of Leinster. Dubthach's wife forced him to sell Brigid's mother to a druid when she became pregnant. Brigid herself was born into slavery. The child Brigid was said to have performed miracles, including healing and feeding the poor. Around the age of ten, she was returned as a household servant to her father, where her habit of charity led her to donate his belongings to anyone who asked. In two Lives, Dubthach was so annoyed with her that he took her in a chariot to the King of Leinster to sell her. While Dubthach was talking to the king, Brigid gave away his jewelled sword to a beggar to barter it for food to feed his family. The king recognized her holiness and convinced Dubthach to grant his daughter her freedom, after which she started her career as a well-known nun.
- Brigitta Scherzenfeldt (1698–1733), Swedish memoirist and weaving teacher who was captured during the Great Northern War and lived enslaved in the kingdom of the Kalmyk in Central Asia.
- Bussa (died 1816), born a free man in West Africa of possible Igbo descent and was captured by African slave merchants, sold to the British, and transported to Barbados in the late 18th century in slavery.

== C ==
- Caenis (died 75 AD), a formerly-enslaved woman and secretary of Antonia Minor (mother of the emperor Claudius) and the mistress of Roman emperor Vespasian.
- Caesar (c. 1737–1852), the last enslaved person to be manumited in New York. A supercentenarian, he may have also been the earliest-born person ever photographed while alive, in 1851.
- Caesar Nero Paul (c. 1741–1823), enslaved as a child in Africa and brought to Exeter, New Hampshire, he was freed and started a prominent New England family of abolitionists.
- Pope Callixtus I (died 223), a formerly-enslaved man, pope from about 218 to about 223, during the reigns of Roman emperors Heliogabalus and Alexander Severus. He was martyred for his Christian faith and is a canonized saint of the Roman Catholic Church.
- Cara Mehmed (c. 1723–1749), an enslaved Ottoman Tripolitanian who gained his freedom during the Lupa revolt in January 1748. As a free man he adopted the name Giovanni Battista Emanuele Pinto, and was executed after being implicated in another slave revolt plot.
- Carlota (died 1844), led a slave rebellion on Cuba in 1843–1844.
- Castus, an enslaved Gaul and one of the leaders of rebellions of enslaved people during the Third Servile War
- Catalina of Motril (fl. 1501–1531), enslaved bedchamber servant of Catherine of Aragon during the marriage of Catherine and Henry VIII in England
- Cato (1786–1803), an enslaved man in Charleston, New York, who murdered twelve-year-old Mary Akins after an attempted rape. His confession was published in the murder literature of the time.
- Cato, an enslaved African-American man who served as an American Black Patriot spy and courier gathering intelligence with his owner, Hercules Mulligan.
- Celia (died 1855), a woman convicted and executed for the murder of Robert Newsom, her enslaver. During the trial, John Jameson argued she had killed him in self defense to stop Newsom from raping her.
- Cesar Picton (c. 1765–1831), enslaved in Senegal, worked as a servant in England, and later became a wealthy coal merchant.
- Cevri Kalfa, an enslaved Georgian girl at the sultan's harem in Istanbul, who saved Mahmud II's life and was rewarded for her bravery and loyalty by being appointed haznedar usta, the chief treasurer of the imperial Harem.

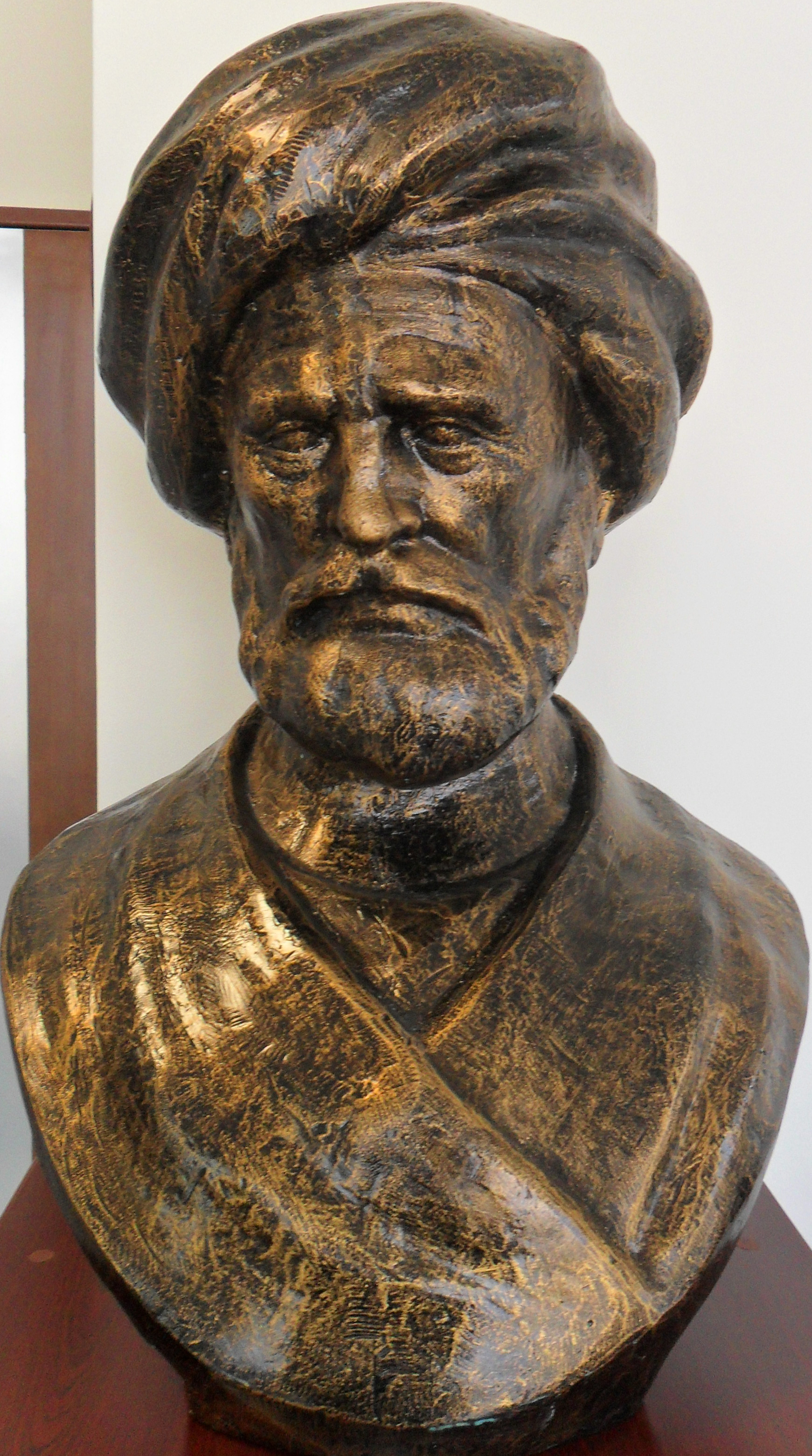
Cezayirli Gazi Hasan Pasha

- Cezayirli Gazi Hasan Pasha (1713–1790), an enslaved Georgian in the Ottoman Empire who rose to be grand vizier, Kapudan Pasha and an army commander.
- Charity Folks (1757–1834), an enslaved African-American born in Annapolis, Maryland, released from slavery in 1797 and later became a property owner.
- Charles Deslondes, Haitian mulatto tasked with overseeing other enslaved people on the André plantation and leader of the 1811 German Coast Uprising in present-day Louisiana. He was brutally killed by the "militia" which put down the slave revolt.

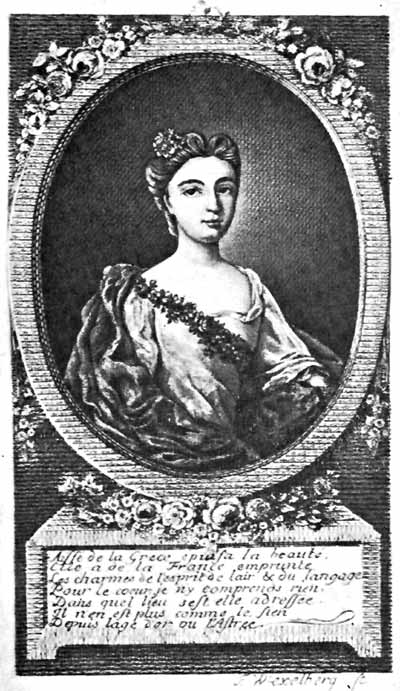
Charlotte Aïssé

- Charlotte Aïssé, (c. 1694–1733), a French letter-writer, the daughter of a Circassian chief, victim of the Ottoman Black Sea slave trade.
- Charlotte Dupuy (c. 1787/1790–c. 1866), also called Lottie, filed a freedom suit in 1829 against her enslaver, Henry Clay, then Secretary of State, and lost.
- Chica da Silva (c. 1732–1796), also known as Xica da Silva, Brazilian courtesan who became famous for becoming rich and powerful despite having been born into slavery.
- Chloe Cooley (fl. 1793), enslaved in Canada, her violent treatment and transport to the United States prompted Upper Canada's 1793 Act Against Slavery.
- Christopher Shields (born 1774), enslaved by George Washington and kept in slavery at Mount Vernon. The location and year in which he died is unknown.
- Christophorus Plato Castanis, (born 1814) a runaway enslaved Greek man from Chios. He came to the United States with Samuel Gridley Howe and John Celivergos Zachos. Castanis was a Greek-American author and lecturer.
- Çiçek Hatun (c. 1442–1498), a Greek girl taken captive during the fall of Constantinople and placed as a concubine in the Ottoman Imperial Harem of Sultan Mehmet II
- Clara Brown (c. 1800–1885), a formerly enslaved Virginian woman who became a community leader, philanthropist and aided settlement of formerly enslaved people during Colorado's Gold Rush.
- Claudia Acte (fl. 1st century), mistress of Roman emperor Nero.
- Pope Clement I (died 100), the fourth Pope according to Catholic tradition. He may have been a freedman of Titus Flavius Clemens.
- Clifton Blackburn Prewitt (1826–1902) formerly enslaved Kentucky man, who became a real estate developer in Georgetown, Kentucky
- Cleon (died 132 BC) leader in the First Servile War.
- Colonel Tye (1753–1780), also known as Titus Cornelius, formerly enslaved, he became a Black Loyalist soldier and guerrilla leader during the American Revolution.
- Crixus, a Gallic gladiator and military leader in the Third Servile War.
- Cudjoe Lewis (c. 1840–1935), born Oluale Kossola, the third-to-last surviving victim in the United States of the Transatlantic slave trade. Transported upon the slave ship Clotilda.
- Cuffy (died 1763), was an Akan man who was captured in his native West Africa, taken to work in the plantations of the Dutch colony of Berbice in present-day Guyana, and in 1763 led a revolt of more than 2,500 enslaved people against the colonial regime. Today, he is a national hero in Guyana.

== D ==
- Dabitum, enslaved woman in Old Babylonia known for her letter concerning a miscarriage.
- Daniel Bell (c. 1802–1877) who tried for decades to obtain lasting freedom for himself, his wife, and his children. He helped organize what was called "the single largest known escape attempt by enslaved Americans", called the Pearl incident in Washington, D.C., in 1848.
- Dada Masiti (c. 1810s–15 July 1919) poet, mystic and Islamic scholar.
- Dave Drake (c. 1801–1876), also known as Dave the Potter.
- Deborah Squash, with her husband Harvey escaped from George Washington's Mount Vernon, joined the British in New York during the American Revolutionary War, and were evacuated in 1783 as freedmen.
- Denmark Vesey (c. 1767–1822), an enslaved African-American man and later a freeman who planned what would have been one of the largest slave rebellions in the United States had word of the plans not been leaked.
- Dido Elizabeth Belle (1761–1804), born into slavery as the natural daughter of Maria Belle, an enslaved African woman in the West Indies, and Sir John Lindsay, a career Royal Navy officer. Lindsay took Belle with him when he returned to England in 1765, entrusting her raising to his uncle William Murray, 1st Earl of Mansfield, and his wife Elizabeth Murray, Countess of Mansfield. The Murrays educated Belle, bringing her up as a free gentlewoman at their Kenwood House, together with their niece, Lady Elizabeth Murray. Belle lived there for 30 years. In his will of 1793, Lord Mansfield confirmed her freedom and provided an outright sum and an annuity to her, making her an heiress.
- Diego was a formerly-enslaved freedman closely associated with the Elizabethan English navigator Francis Drake. In March 1573, Drake raided Darien (in modern Panama), in which he was greatly aided by Maroons – Africans who had escaped from Spanish enslaver and were glad to help their English enemies. One of them was Diego, who proved a capable ship builder and accompanied Drake back to England. In 1577, when Queen Elizabeth sent Drake to start an expedition against the Spanish along the Pacific coast of the Americas – which eventually developed into Drake circumnavigating the world – Diego was once again employed under Drake; his fluency in Spanish and English would make him a useful interpreter when Spaniards or Spanish-speaking Portuguese were captured. He was employed as Drake's servant and was paid wages, just like the rest of the crew. Diego died while Drake's ship was crossing the Pacific, of wounds sustained earlier in the voyage. Drake was saddened at his death, Diego having become a good friend.
- Diogenes of Sinope (c. 412–323 BCE), Greek philosopher kidnapped by pirates and sold in Corinth.
- Diocletian (244–312), Emperor of Rome, was by some sources born as the into slavery and enslaved by Senator Anullinus. By other sources, it was Diocletian's father (whose own name is unknown) who was enslaved, and was freed prior to the birth of his son, the future emperor.
- Dionysius I (died 1492), Ecumenical Patriarch of Constantinople, previously enslaved by the Ottomans after the Fall of Constantinople in 1453.
- Dolly Johnson (born late 1820s, died after 1887), African-American woman from Tennessee, enslaved by President Andrew Johnson, later a small small-business owner.
- Dorota Sitańska (died after 1797), Polish serf and Royal Ballet Dancer, donated to the king of Poland by will and testament.

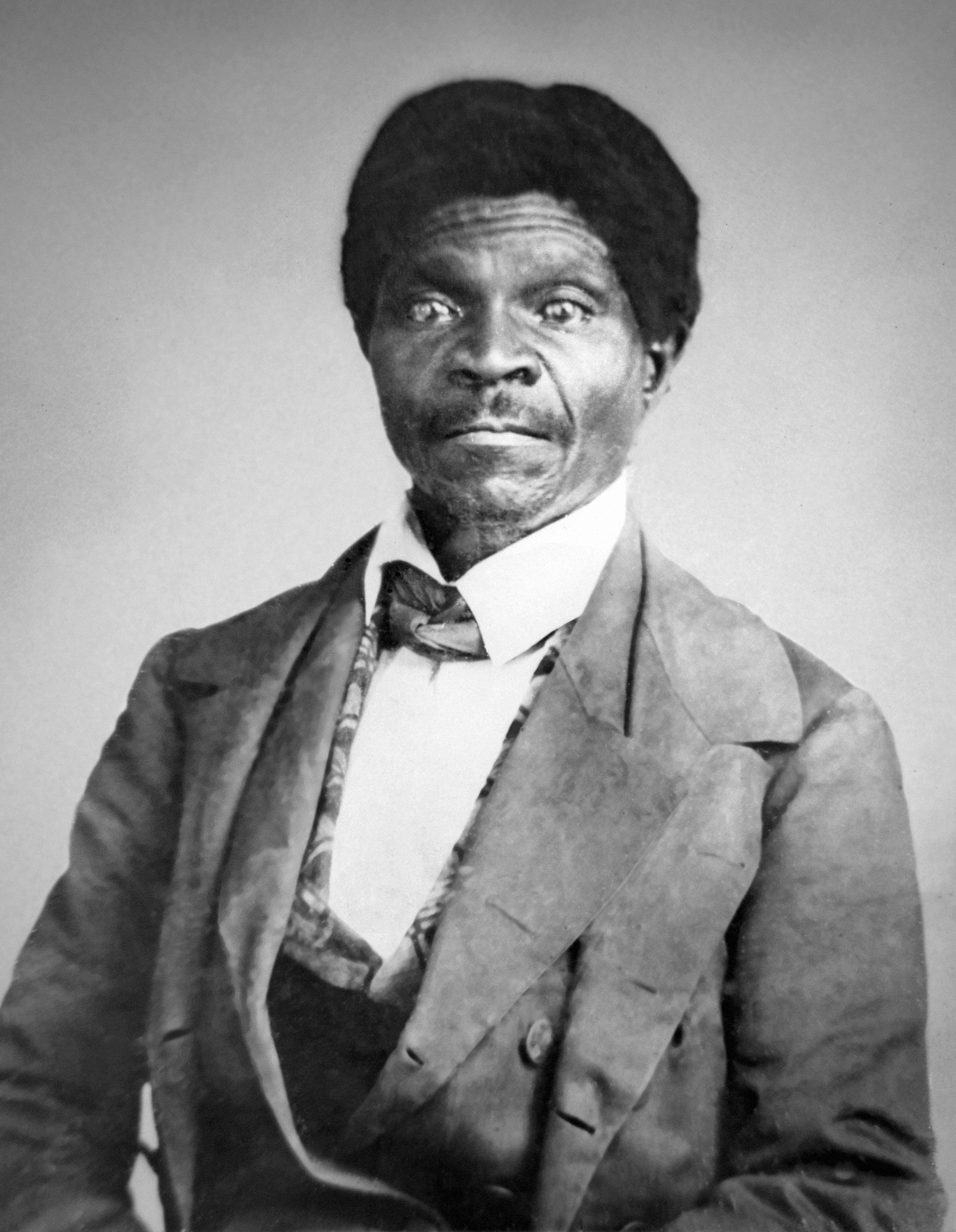
Dred Scott

- Dred Scott (c. 1799–1858), an enslaved African-American man in Missouri who sued for his freedom in a nationally publicized trial, Scott v. Sandford, that reached the United States Supreme Court in 1857.

== E ==
- Edward Mozingo Sr., (c. 1649–1712), kidnapped from Africa when about 10 years old, sold into slavery in Jamestown, Virginia. After his owner died, he sued for his freedom and won it. He married an impoverished white woman, Margaret Pierce Bayley (1645–1711) and together they, essentially, founded the Mozingo family line in North America.
- Elijah Abel (1808–1884), born enslaved in Maryland and believed to have escaped slavery on the Underground Railroad into Canada. He joined the Church of Jesus Christ of Latter-day Saints in its early days, was among the first blacks to receive its priesthood and the first black person to rise to the ranks of an elder and seventy.
- Elizabeth Marsh (1735–1785), an Englishwoman who was captured by corsairs and held in slavery in Morocco.
- Edith Hern Fossett, a woman enslaved by U.S. President Thomas Jefferson, was taught to cook by a French chef and created French cuisine at the White House and at Monticello.
- Elias Polk (1806–1886), a conservative political activist of the 19th century.
- Eliezer of Damascus, enslaved by Abraham and trusted as manager of the Patriarch's household in the Hebrew Bible.
- Elieser was a man enslaved by the family of Paulo de Pina, Portuguese Jews who moved to the Netherlands in 1610 to escape persecution and forced conversion in Portugal. He lived with the family in Amsterdam until his death in 1629 and was buried in the Beth Haim cemetery, oldest Jewish cemetery in the Netherlands. He appears to have been set free, either de jure or in practice, and to have been on near equal footing with the family that owned him back in Portugal – indicated by the fact that he attended the funeral of the wife of his master, Sara de Pina, and contributed to that occasion six stuivers, and that he was buried alongside his (former) owners and alongside Jacob Israel Belmonte, the community's richest businessman. Elieser must have been converted to Judaism and widely accepted as Jewish, otherwise he would not have been buried inside the Jewish cemetery; the name "Elieser" was likely bestowed on him at conversion, recalling Eliezer of Damascus. In recent years, Elieser's memory was taken up by members of the Surinamese community in the Netherlands, who erected a statue of him and hold an annual pilgrimage to his grave on what came to be known as Elieser Day.
- Elisenda de Sant Climent (1220–1275), enslaved during a slave raid on Mallorca and placed in the harem of the emir in Tunis.
- Eliza Hopewell, a woman enslaved by Confederate spy Isabella Maria Boyd ("Belle Boyd"). In 1862, she aided her owner's espionage activities, carrying messages to the Confederate Army in a hollowed-out watch case.
- Eliza Moore (1843–1948), one of the last proven enslaved African-Americans living in the United States.
- Elizabeth Johnson Forby, mixed-race American woman enslaved by President Andrew Johnson, daughter of Dolly Johnson.
- Elizabeth Key Grinstead (1630–after 1665), the first woman of African ancestry in the North American colonies to sue for her freedom and win. Key and her infant son, John Grinstead, were freed on July 21, 1656, in the colony of Virginia, based on the fact that her father was an Englishman and that she was a baptized Christian.
- Elizabeth Freeman (c. 1742–1829), known as Bett and later Mum Bett, was among the first enslaved black people in Massachusetts to file a freedom suit and win in court under the 1780 constitution, with a ruling that slavery was illegal.
- Elizabeth Hobbs Keckley (1818–1907), best known as the personal modiste and confidante of Mary Todd Lincoln, the First Lady of the United States. Keckley wrote and published an autobiography, Behind the Scenes: Or, Thirty Years a Slave and Four Years in the White House (1868).
- Ellen Craft (1826–1891), light-skinned wife of William Craft, who escaped with him from Georgia to Philadelphia, by posing as a white woman and a man she enslaved, in a case that became famous.
- Ellen More, an enslaved woman brought to the royal Scottish court
- Emilia Soares de Patrocinio (1805–1886) was an enslaved Brazilian, enslaver, and businesswoman.
- Emiline (age 23); Nancy (20); Lewis, brother of Nancy (16); Edward, brother of Emiline (13); Lewis and Edward, sons of Nancy (7); Ann, daughter of Nancy (5); and Amanda, daughter of Emiline (2), were freed in the 1852 Lemmon v. New York court case after they were brought to New York by their Virginia owners.
- Emily Edmonson (1835–1895), along with her sister Mary, joined an unsuccessful 1848 escape attempt known as the Pearl incident, but Henry Ward Beecher and his church raised the funds to free them.
- Enrique of Malacca, also known as Henry the Black, enslaved man, and interpreter of Ferdinand Magellan and possibly the first man to circumnavigate the globe in Magellan's voyage of 1519–1521.
- Epictetus (55–c. 135), ancient Greek stoic philosopher.
- Estevanico (1500–1539), also known as Esteban the Moor. In principle he was enslaved by the Portuguese to, later, be a servant of the Spaniards. He was one of only four survivors of the ill-fated Narváez expedition, later a guide in search of the fabled Seven Cities of Gold and possibly the first African person to arrive in what is now Arizona and New Mexico.
- Eston Hemings (1808–1856), son of Sally Hemings and Thomas Jefferson.
- Eucharis, a Greek born freedwoman of Roman Licinia, described in her epitaph in the 1st century AD as fourteen when she died, a child actress and a professional dancer.
- Eunus (died 132 BC), an enslaved Roman from Apamea in Syria, the leader of the slave uprising in the First Servile War in the Roman province of Sicily. Eunus rose to prominence in the movement through his reputation as a prophet and wonder-worker. He claimed to receive visions and communications from the goddess Atargatis, a prominent goddess in his homeland; he identified her with the Sicilian Demeter. Some of his prophecies were that the rebel enslaved would successfully capture the city of Enna and that he would be a king some day.
- Euphemia (died 520s), Empress of the Byzantine Empire by marriage to Justin I, originally enslaved.
- Euphraios, an enslaved Athenian and banker.
- Exuperius (died 127), enslaved in Pamphylia, Roman Anatolia and a Christian martyr. He and his family were killed for refusing to participate in pagan rites when their son was born.

== F ==
- Fabia Arete, Ancient Roman actress and freedwoman who is referred to as an elite actress or archimima who enjoyed a highly successful career and likely belonged to the minority of female actors to perform speaking parts.
- Felicitas (died 203), Christian martyr and saint.
- Fezzeh Khanom (c. 1835–1882), an African woman enslaved by the Báb.

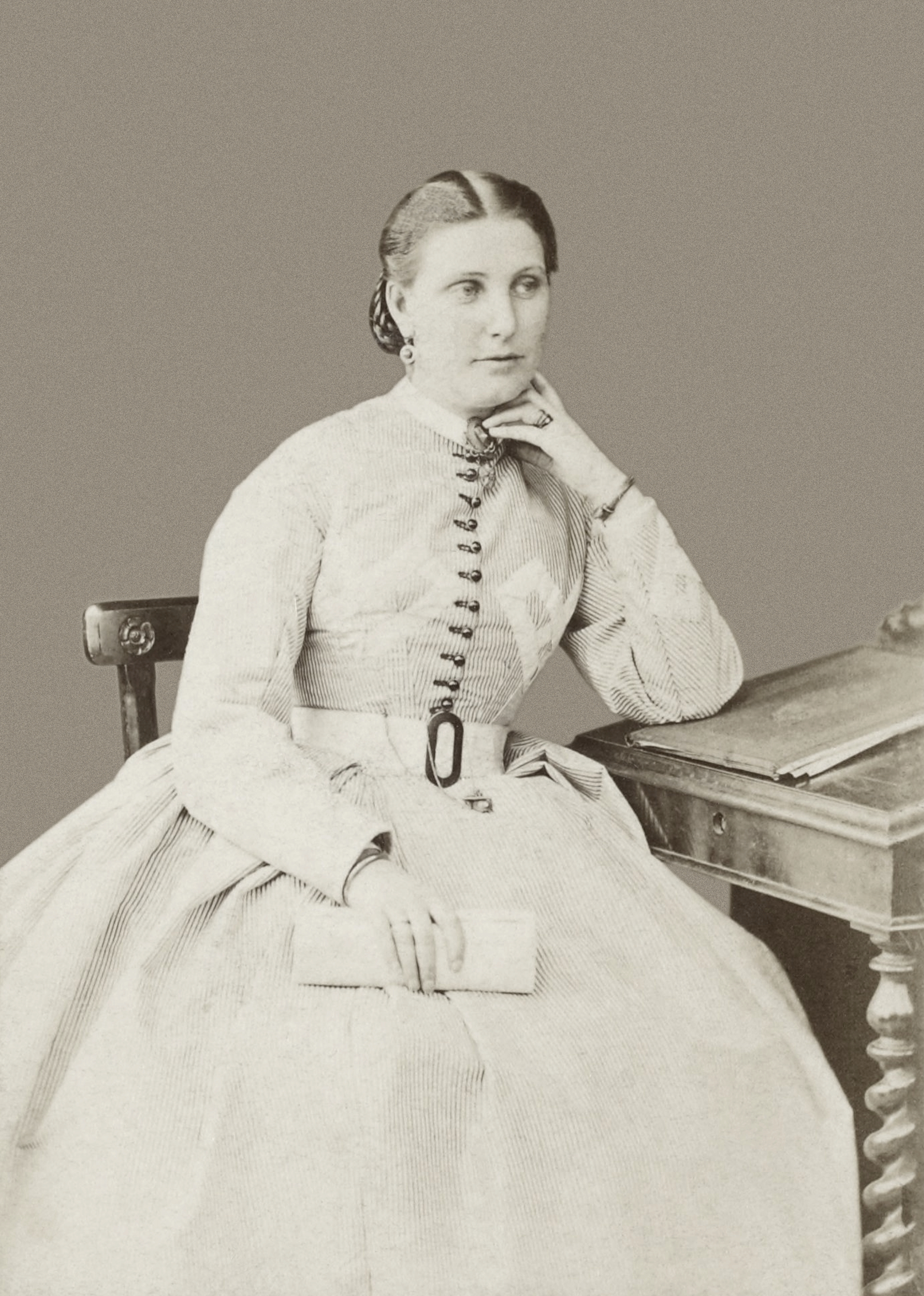
Florence Baker

- Florence Baker (1841–1916), a Hungarian-British explorer, sold into slavery in the Ottoman Empire and saved by Samuel Baker whom she later married.
- Florence Johnson Smith, mixed-race American woman enslaved by President Andrew Johnson, daughter of Dolly Johnson.
- Fortunata, a Roman woman who was sold into slavery in London in the first or second century AD.
- Fountain Hughes (1848–1957), interviewed in June 1949 about his life by the Library of Congress as part of the Federal Writers' Project.
- Francis Bok (born 1979), an enslaved Dinka from South Sudan, now an abolitionist and author in the United States.
- Francis Jackson (born 1815 to 1820), born free, he was kidnapped in 1850 and sold into slavery and was finally freed in 1855 with the resolution of Francis Jackson v. John W. Deshazer.
- Francis James Grimké (1850–1937), minister.
- Francisco Menéndez, a man enslaved in South Carolina who escaped to Spanish Florida, where he served in the Spanish militia, leading the garrison established in 1738 at Fort Mose. This site was the first legal free black community in what is now the United States.
- François Mackandal (died 1758), Haitian Maroon leader.

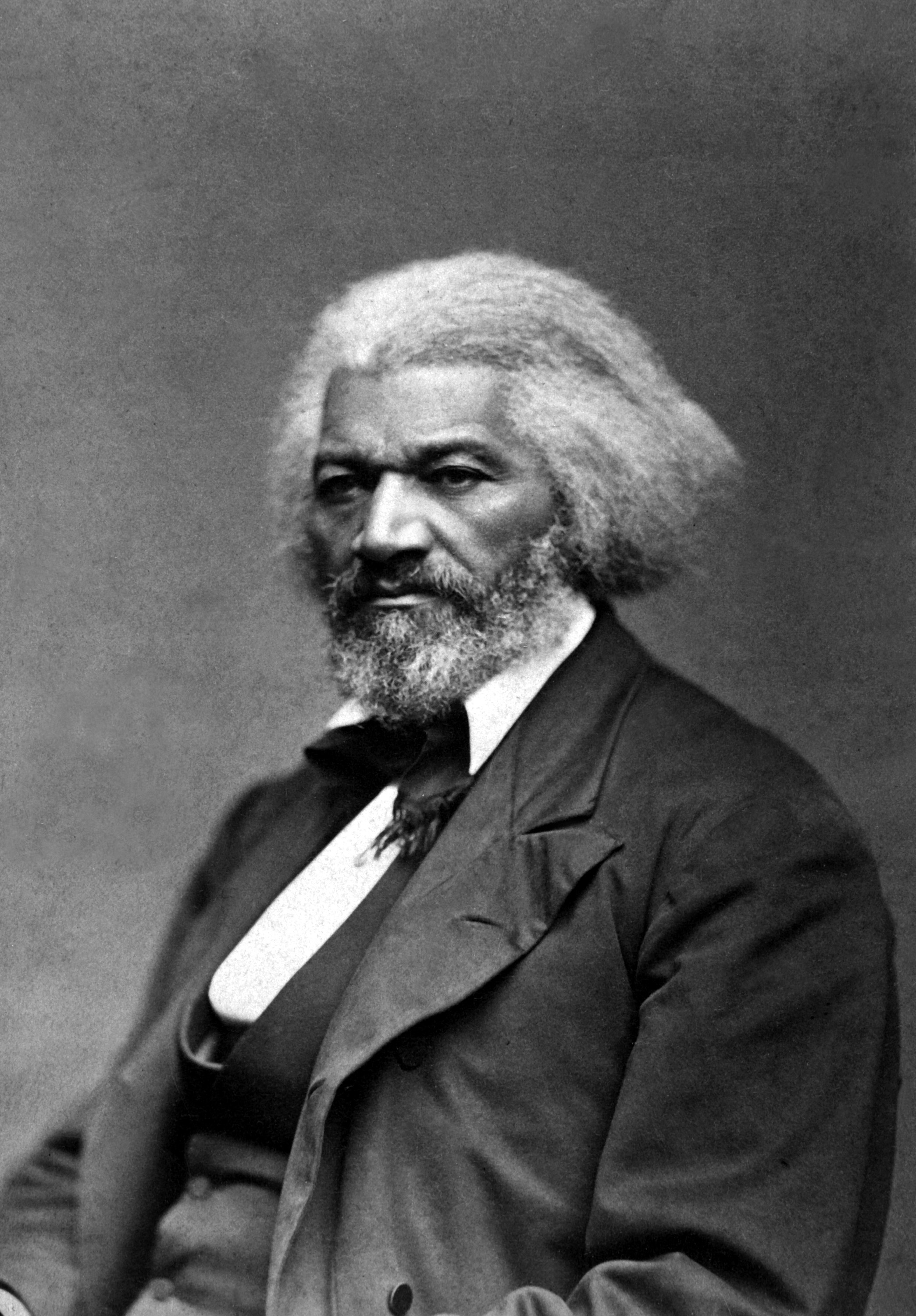
Frederick Douglass

- Frederick Douglass (1818–1895), born into slavery in Maryland and escaped to the Northeast in 1838, where he became an internationally renowned abolitionist writer, speaker, and diplomat.

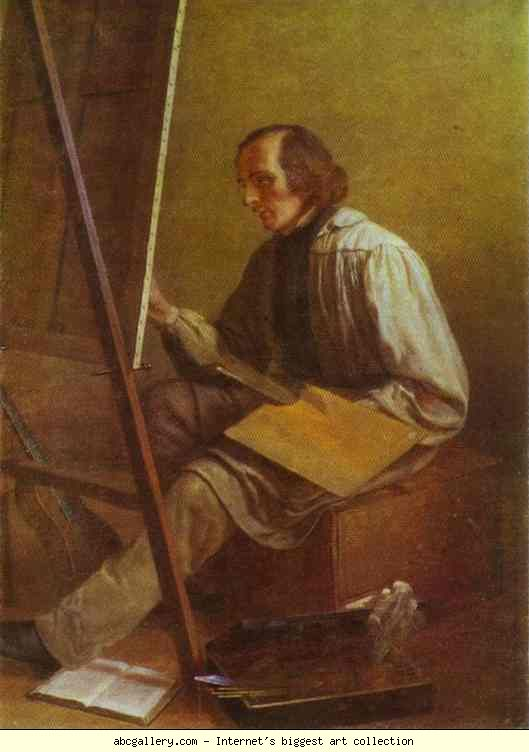
Fyodor Slavyansky

- Fyodor Slavyansky (1817–1876), Russian serf painter.

== G ==
- Gabriel Prosser (1776–1800), leader of Virginia slave revolt.
- Gaius Furius Chresimus, ancient Roman. As a freedman, he produced such crops from his small farm that he was accused of witching away other people's crops, but when he produced his agricultural implements in court, he was acquitted. Pliny the Elder recounts his tale as evidence that hard work is what counts in farming.
- Galatian de Sesse (16th century), Aragonese Hospitaller knight and Governor of Gozo who was enslaved during the 1551 Ottoman attack on Gozo and spent five years as a galley slave before being ransomed and freed.
- Galeria Lysistrate (2nd century), mistress of Roman emperor Antoninus Pius.
- Ganga Zumba or Ganazumba (c. 1630–1678), a descendant of an unknown king of Kongo who escaped slavery in colonial Brazil and became the first leader of the runaway slave settlement of Quilombo dos Palmares.
- Gannicus, an enslaved Celt and one of the leaders of rebel slaves during the Third Servile War
- Garafilia Mohalbi (1817–1830), an enslaved Greek child, rescued by an American merchant and brought to Boston. She died young and inspired a huge art movement.
- Genghis Khan (c. 1162–1227), captured after a raid and enslaved by the Taichiud.
- George Africanus (1763–1834), an enslaved African man from Sierra Leone who became a successful entrepreneur in Nottingham.
- George Edward Doney (1758–1809), Gambian man enslaved by William Capell, 4th Earl of Essex.
- George Colvocoresses (1816–1872), from Chios, Greece, who came to the United States and became a captain in the U.S. Navy, was briefly enslaved as a child. Colvos Passage is named after him.
- George Freeman Bragg (1863–1940), born into slavery in North Carolina and later became a leading Episcopal priest and social activist.
- George Lewis (1794–1811), also known as Slave George, was an enslaved man murdered in Kentucky on the night of December 15–16, 1811.
- George Moses Horton (1797–1884), the first African-American author; first book of poetry published in North Carolina.
- George Washington Carver (c. 1864–1943), an African-American scientist, botanist, educator and inventor known for encouraging cultivation of alternative crops to cotton such as sweet potatoes and peanuts in the South; born into slavery in Missouri and freed as a young child following the American Civil War.
- George Griffin (1849–1897), born into slavery in Maryland and later freed; confidant of Mark Twain
- George W. Hayes (1847–1933), a court crier and politician in Ohio of mixed African American and Native American heritage enslaved early in his life.
- Gerónimo de Aguilar (1489–1531), a Franciscan friar, shipwrecked on the Yucatán Peninsula in 1511 and captured and enslaved by Mayans.
- Gosala, a sixth-century BC ascetic teacher of ancient India – a contemporary (and rival) of Gautama Buddha – was said to have been born into slavery, and became a naked ascetic after fleeing from his irate captor, who managed to grab hold of Gosala's garment and disrobe him as he fled.
- Gonzalo Guerrero (died 1536), a sailor from Palos, Spain, who shipwrecked along the Yucatán Peninsula in 1511 and was enslaved by the local Maya.

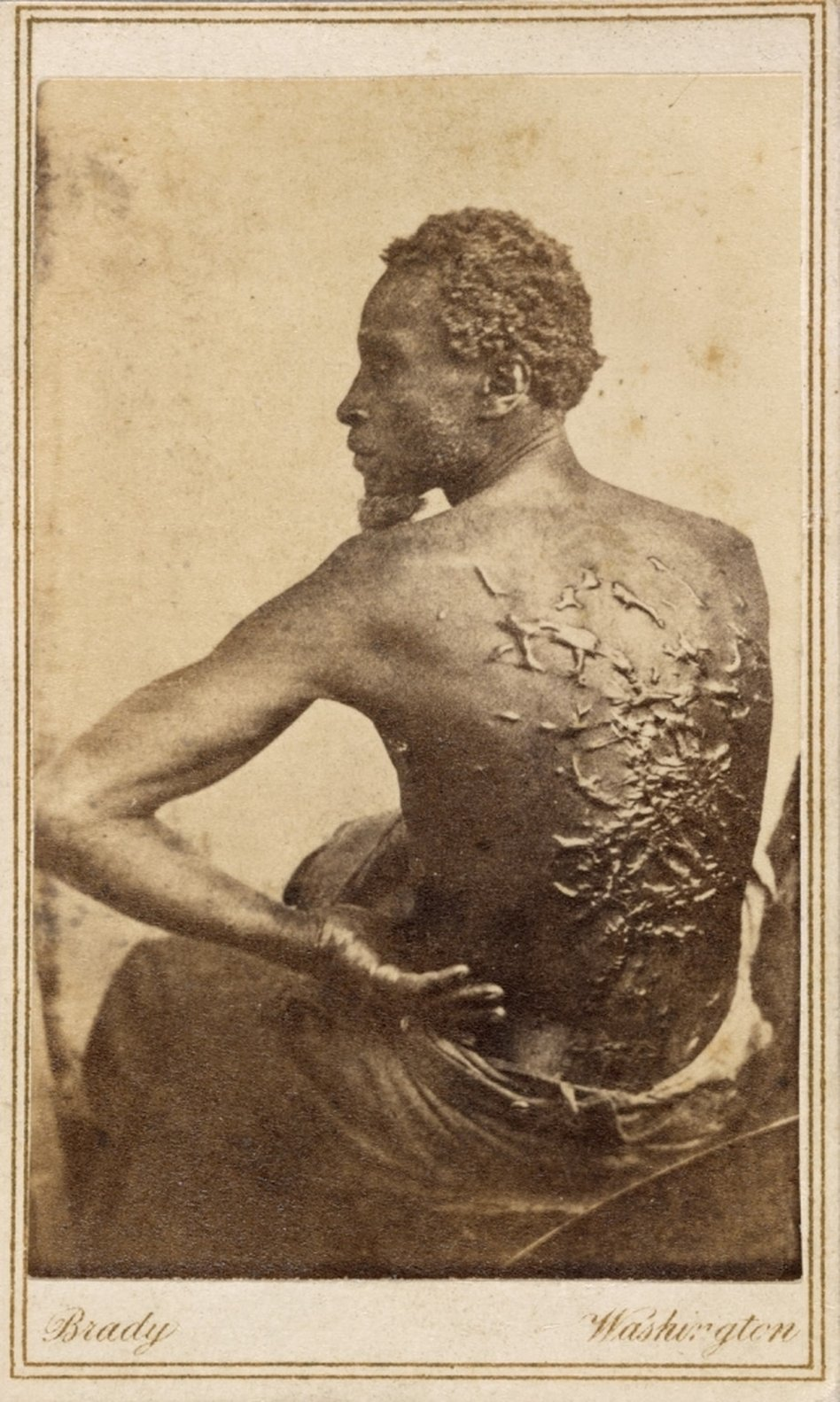
Gordon

- Gordon, also known as Whipped Peter, an enslaved African-American man who escaped to a Union Army camp from a plantation near Baton Rouge, Louisiana in 1863. The images of Gordon's scourged back taken during a medical examination were published in Harper's Weekly and provided Northerners visual evidence of the brutality of slavery. They inspired many free blacks to enlist in the Union Army.

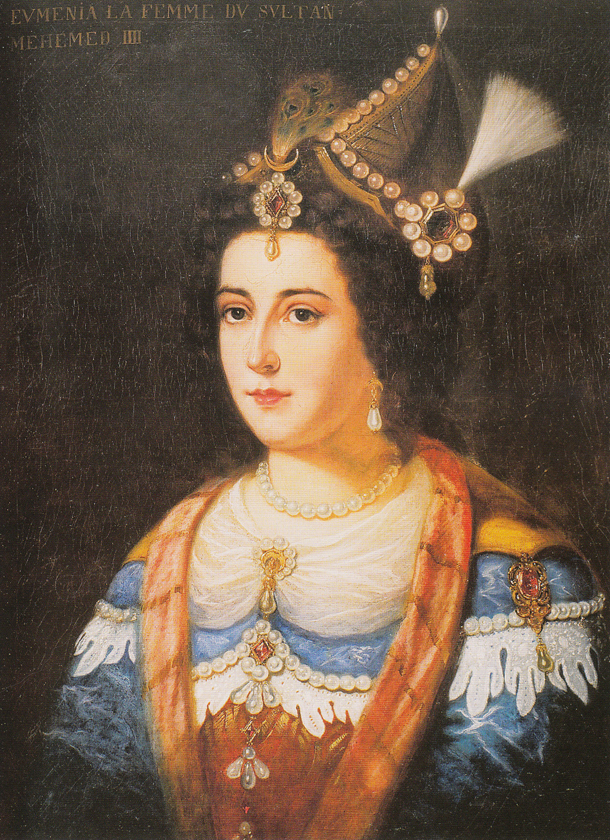
Gülnuş Sultan

- Gülnuş Sultan (1642–1715) was Haseki Sultan of Ottoman Sultan Mehmed IV and Valide sultan to their sons Mustafa II and Ahmed III.
- Guðríður Símonardóttir (1598–1682), Icelandic woman taken captive by North African slavers (Barbary Pirates).
- Gustav Badin (died 1822), servant at the royal Swedish court, originally an enslaved Dane.

== H ==
- Hababah, concubine of Caliph Yazid II.
- Hagar, biblical figure, belonging to Sarah.
- Hannah Bond (born 1830s), pen name Hannah Crafts, wrote The Bondwoman's Narrative after gaining her freedom. Possibly the first novel by an African-American woman, it is the only known novel written by a woman fugitive from slavery.
- Hannah Jackson (c. 1794–1894), a former enslaved housekeeper of Seventh U.S. President Andrew Jackson, purchased as a child to be a companion to Jackson's wife, Rachel. Hannah and her family escaped to freedom in 1863.
- Hark Olufs (1708–1754), Danish sailor, was captured by Algerian pirates. Sold to the Bey of Constantine, he became Commander in Chief of the Bey's cavalry. He was released in 1735.
- Harriet Balfour (c. 1818–1858), Surinam-born enslaved woman who was freed in 1841 and moved to Scotland
- Harriet Evans Paine, (c. 1822–1917), Texas enslaved woman and later oral historian and storyteller.
- Harriet Hemings (1801–after 1822), daughter of Sally Hemings and Thomas Jefferson.
- Harriet Jacobs (1813–1897), author of Incidents in the Life of a Slave Girl.
- Harriet Powers (1837–1910), American folk artist, and quilter.
- Harriet Tubman (c. 1822–1913), nicknamed "Moses" because of her efforts in helping other enslaved Americans escape through the Underground Railroad.
- Harry, the plaintiff in the 1818 Harry v. Decker & Hopkins decision by the Supreme Court of Mississippi (the first among U.S. southern states) to free a person from slavery solely on the basis of prior residence in a free territory.
- Harry Washington (died 1800), also known as Henry Washington, was enslaved by George Washington. Transported into slavery in to America, he was bought by Washington in 1763 to work on a project for draining the Great Dismal Swamp.
- Hafsa Sultan (died March 1534), the wife of Selim I and the first valid sultan of the Ottoman Empire as the mother of Suleiman the Magnificent. Her background is disputed but some historians hold that she was enslaved.
- Helen Gloag (1750–1790), of Muthill, Perthshire, Scotland, became the Empress of Morocco as the harem slave of Morocco's sultan.
- Henry Bibb (1815–1854), American author and abolitionist who was born enslaved. After escaping from slavery to British Upper Canada, he founded an abolitionist newspaper, The Voice of the Fugitive. He later returned to the U.S. and lectured against slavery.
- Henry Highland Garnet (1815–1882), born an enslaved African-American in Maryland, escaped slavery in 1824, and became an abolitionist and educator.
- Hercules (born c. 1755), head cook enslaved by George Washington at Washington's plantation, Mount Vernon. He escaped and gained his freedom in 1797, but his wife Alice and his three children remained enslaved.
- Hermas, author of the text The Shepherd of Hermas and brother of Pope Pius I.
- Hernando de Escalante Fontaneda, born in Cartagena, was enslaved at the age of 13 when the ship bearing him to Spain for education sank off Florida. A Calusa chief enslaved him and used him as a translator until he was ransomed at 30.
- Horace King (1807–1885), American architect, engineer, and bridge builder, was born into slavery on a South Carolina plantation.
- Hümaşah Sultan (fl. 1647–1672) was the wife of Sultan Ibrahim of the Ottoman Empire.

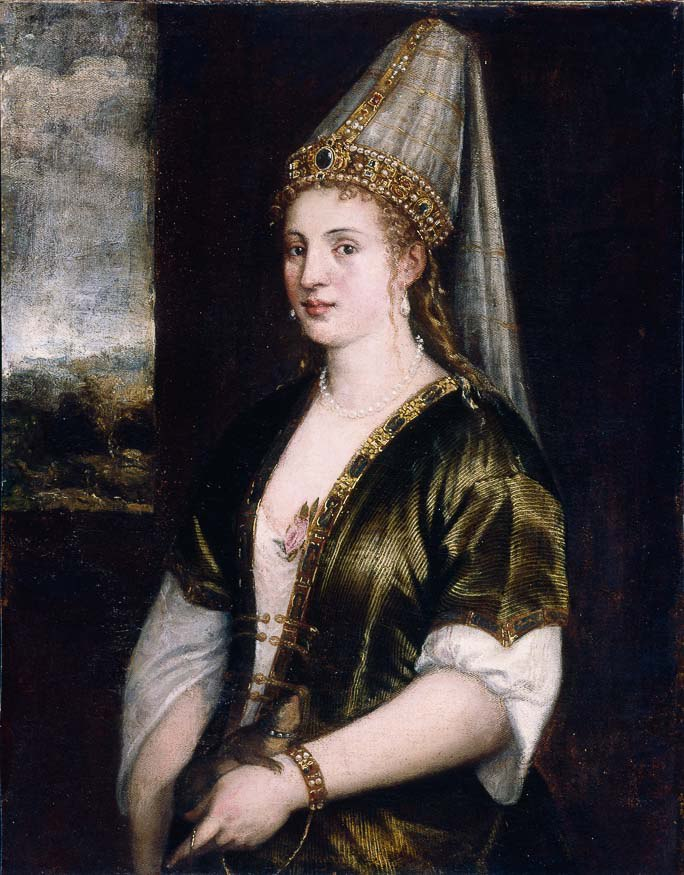
Hurrem Sultan

- Hurrem Sultan (c. 1504–1558), also known as Roxelana, an Eastern European girl, was captured by slave traders and sold to the Imperial Harem, becoming the chief consort and legal wife of the Ottoman sultan Süleyman the Magnificent.
- Halime Sultan (c. 1570–after 1639), Valide Sultan and de facto co-ruler of the Ottoman Empire
- Handan Sultan (c. 1568–1605), Valide Sultan and de facto regent of the Ottoman Empire

== I ==
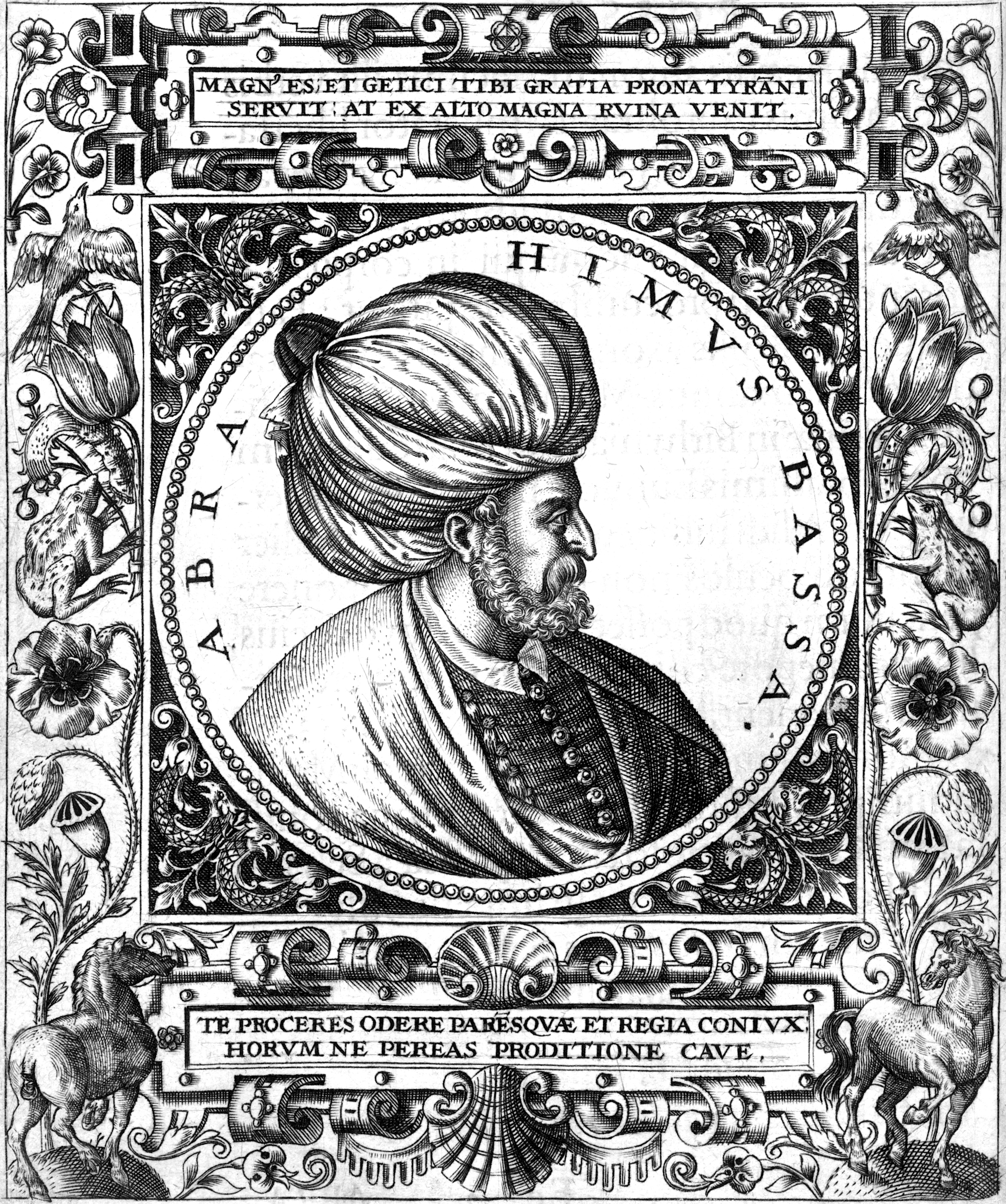
Ibrahim Pasha

- Ibrahim Pasha (c. 1495–1536), Suleiman the Magnificent's first appointed Grand Vizier. Greek by birth, at the age of six he was sold as a into slavery to the Ottoman palace for future sultans where he befriended Suleiman, who was the same age.
- Icelus Marcianus, enslaved by Roman emperor Galba in the 1st century CE, and later freedman. He was one of three men said to completely control the emperor, increasing Galba's unpopularity.
- Ida B. Wells (1862–1931), prominent African-American activist, born into slavery, who in later life campaigned against and succeeded in abolishing lynching. In 1909 she co-founded the National Association for the Advancement of Colored People (NAACP).
- Imma, a Northumbrian aristocrat who was knocked unconscious in battle (in 679 AD) and later pretended to have been a peasant, so that his captors would not kill him. His manners and bearing soon betrayed him, and he was sold into slavery.
- Isabel de Solís (fl. 1485), enslaved Castilian concubine of Abu l-Hasan Ali, Sultan of Granada.
- Isabella Gibbons (1826–1890), became a schoolteacher in Virginia after her liberation in 1865.
- Isfandíyár, an enslaved servant in Bahá'u'lláh's house in Tehran, Isfandíyár died in Mazandaran
- Israel Jefferson (c. 1800–after 1873), known as Israel Gillette before 1844, was born into slavery at Monticello, the estate of Thomas Jefferson, and worked as a domestic servant close to Jefferson for years.
- Ivan Bolotnikov (1565–1608), a fugitive kholop (enslaved in Russia) and leader of the Bolotnikov rebellion in 1606–1607.

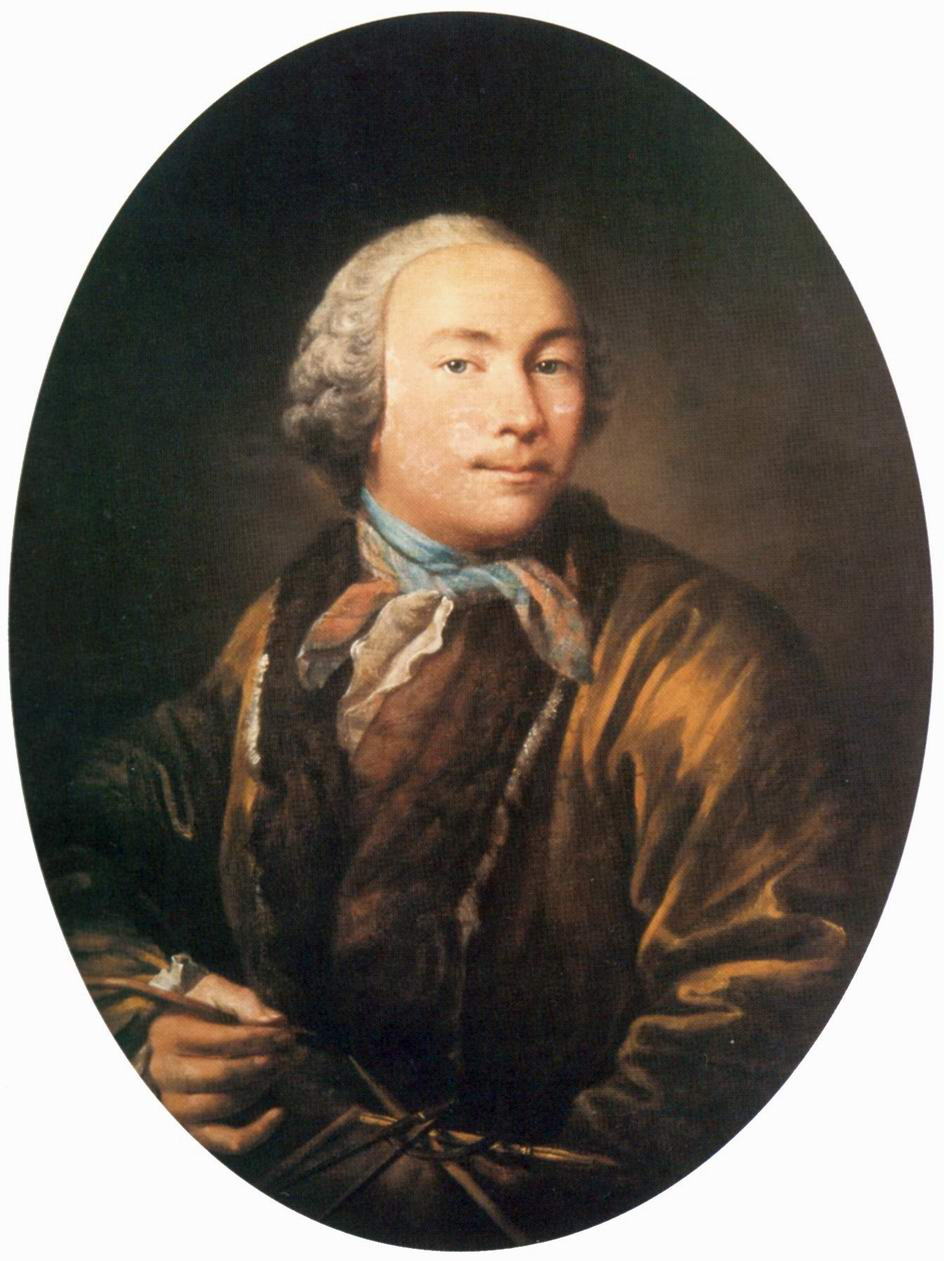
Ivan Argunov

- Ivan Argunov (1729–1802), Russian serf painter, one of the founders of the Russian school of portrait painting.

== J ==
- Jack Gladstone, leader of the Demerara rebellion of 1823.
- Jackey Wright, an enslaved American woman who sued for and won her freedom in the famous 1806 Virginia case of Hudgins v. Wright. The opinion of the Virginia Supreme Court relied on Wright appearing white and Native American, whereas the lower court under George Wythe had tried to establish a presumption of freedom for all people, regardless of race.
- Jacob Notaras (fl. 1453), Byzantine nobleman enslaved by Sultan Mehmed the Conqueror during the fall of Constantinople.
- Jaja of Opobo (1821–1891), sold at about the age of 12 into slavery in the Kingdom of Bonny in present-day Nigeria. Proving at an early age his aptitude for business, he not only earned his way out of slavery but also became a rich and powerful merchant prince and the founder of the Opobo city-state, his career eventually ended by the British colonizers whom he tried to defy.
- James Armistead Lafayette (1760–1830), an enslaved African-American man who served the Continental Army in the American Revolutionary War as a double agent.
- James Baugh, an enslaved American who sued for his freedom on the grounds that his maternal grandmother had been an Indian.
- James Hemings (1765–1801), mixed-race American man enslaved and later freed by Thomas Jefferson. He was the older brother of Sally Hemings and a half-sibling of Jefferson's wife, Martha Wayles Skelton Jefferson, through their father John Wayles.
- James Leander Cathcart (1767–1843), a diplomat and sailor notable for his narrative of eleven years of enslavement in Algiers and for his diplomatic accomplishments while in slavery.
- James Poovey (born c. 1769), a Philadelphian who was enslaved from birth and achieved manumission through non-violent disobedience.
- James M. Priest (1819–1883), 6th Vice President of Liberia, born into slavery in Kentucky
- James Somersett or Somerset, a man enslaved in colonial America whose escape while in England in 1771, supported by notable British abolitionists, led to the milestone legal case Somerset v Stewart, which effectively ended slavery in Britain, though not in its colonies.
- James W. C. Pennington (c. 1807–1870), African-American writer and abolitionist.
- Jan Ernst Matzeliger (1852–1889), a Surinamese-American inventor in shoe manufacturing.
- Jane Johnson (1814/1827–1872), gained freedom on July 18, 1855, with her two young sons while in Philadelphia with her owner and his family. She was aided by William Still and Passmore Williamson, abolitionists of the Pennsylvania Anti-Slavery Society and its Vigilance Committee.
- Jean Amilcar (c. 1781–1793), the Senegalese foster son of Marie Antoinette.
- Jean-Jacques Dessalines (1758–1806), leader of the Haitian Revolution and first leader of independent Haiti.
- Jean Marteilhe (1684–1777), French Huguenot slave narrator, he served as a galley slave.
- Jean Saint Malo (died 1784), leader of runaway slaves (maroon colony) in Spanish Louisiana and namesake of Saint Malo, Louisiana.

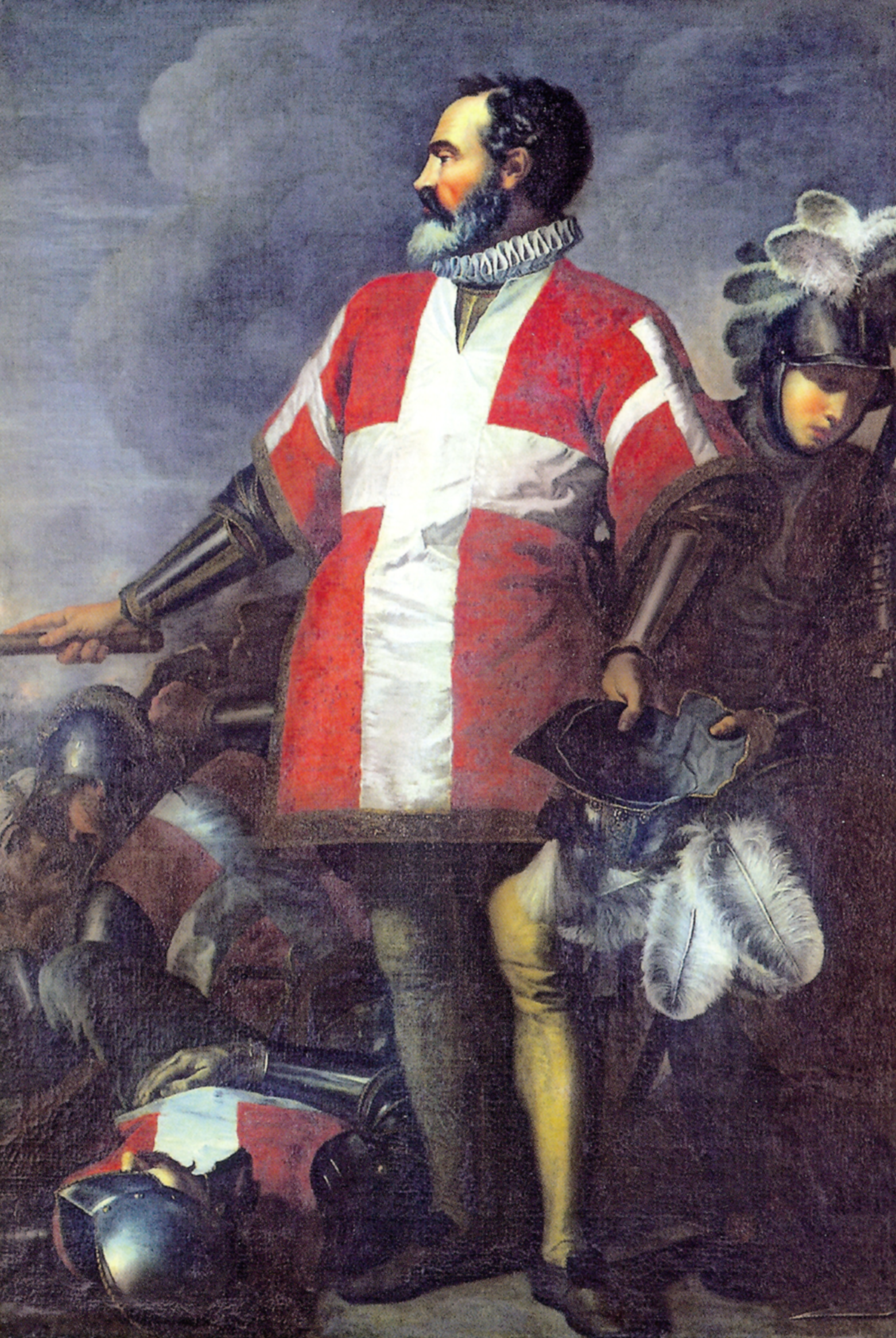
Jean Parisot de Valette

- Jean Parisot de Valette (1495–1568), a knight of the Order of Saint John was captured and made a galley slave in 1541 by Barbary pirates under the command of Turgut Reis. He was freed after about a year and later became Grand Master of the Order.
- Jefferson F. Long (1836–1901), first former enslaved person to serve in the United States Congress and the first African American to represent the state of Georgia in Congress.
- Jeffrey Hudson (1619–c. 1682), an English courtier who spent 25 years enslaved in North Africa.
- Jehan Alard (fl. 1580), a French Huguenot who served as a galley slave in Italy, condemned by the Inquisition.
- Jehu Grant (c. 1752–1840), Revolutionary War veteran.
- Jeremiah Haralson (1846–unknown), formerly enslaved person and politician who represented Alabama's 1st congressional district in the United States House of Representatives during the 44th United States Congress.
- Jermain Wesley Loguen (1813–1872), an African-American man who escaped slavery and became an abolitionist, a bishop of the African Methodist Episcopal Zion Church, and the author of a slave narrative.
- Jim Cuff or Jim Crow was a physically disabled enslaved African man, variously claimed to have resided in St. Louis, Cincinnati, or Pittsburgh, whose song and dance supposedly inspired the blackface song and dance "Jump Jim Crow" by white comedian Thomas D. Rice. The great popularity of Rice's creation soon led to Jim Crow becoming a pejorative name for blacks, and later to the name being used for the segregationist Jim Crow Laws, a mockery of the namesake.
- Jim Henson, an African man who escaped slavery and published his memoirs, Broken Shackles, in Canada.
- Joana da Gama (c. 1520–1586), a Portuguese maid-of-honor and writer.
- Joe, a man enslaved by William B. Travis, one of the Texian commanders in the Battle of Alamo. After the Texian defeat, Mexican General Santa Anna spared Joe, hoping to convince other enslaved people in Texas to support the Mexican government over the Texian rebellion. Afterwards, Joe together with some other survivors were sent to Gonzales and encouraged to relate the events of the battle, and to inform the remainder of the Texian forces that Santa Anna's army was unbeatable.
- John Axouch (1087–1150), a Seljuk Turk captured as a child by the Byzantine Empire, freed and raised in the imperial household as the companion of future emperor John II Komnenos, and on his accession given command of the empire's armies and remaining the emperor's only close personal friend and confidant.
- John Boston (c. 1832–after 1880) a formerly-enslaved man who represented Darlington County for the South Carolina House of Representatives during the Reconstruction era. He was involved in community endeavors and, as a minister, established the Lamar Colored Methodist Church in 1865. By 1880, he was a farmer.
- John "Lit" Fleming, born into slavery in Virginia but later moved to Edmundson, Arkansas, with his parents and siblings. He would then move to Memphis, Tennessee, and was part-owner of the newspaper Memphis Free Speech with activist Ida B. Wells-Barnett.
- John Munroe Brazealle, along with his mother, the subjects of Hinds v. Brazealle (1838), a case in the Supreme Court of Mississippi which denied the legality and inheritance rights in Mississippi of deeds of manumission executed by Elisha Brazealle, a Mississippi resident, in Ohio to free the pair.
- John Brown (c. 1810–1876), escaped and wrote of conditions in the Deep South of the United States.
- John Casor, the first to be enslaved as the result of a civil case in the Thirteen Colonies (Virginia Colony, 1655).
- John Ezzidio (c. 1810–1872), enslaved Nigerian man who became a successful Sierra Leonese politician and businessman.
- John Adams Hyman (1840-1891), formerly enslaved politician who served in the North Carolina Senate and who later served as the first African American to represent the state in Congress.
- John Jea (born 1773), enslaved African-American man best known for his 1811 autobiography, The Life, History, and Unparalleled Sufferings of John Jea, the African Preacher.
- John Joyce, born into slavery in Maryland, served in the United States Navy, held a variety of jobs after, and murdered a shopkeeper, Sarah Cross; his life and crime recounted in the murder literature of his day.
- John R. Jewitt (1783–1821), an English armourer who spent three years as a captive of Maquinna of the Nuu-chah-nulth (Nootka) people on the Pacific coast of what is now Canada.
- John R. Lynch (1847–1939), formerly enslaved politician who served in the Mississippi House of Representatives becoming the first African American to serve as the leader of a state legislative chamber. Later served in the United States House of Representatives and authored The Facts of Reconstruction to address criticisms of Reconstruction era policies.
- John Punch (c. 1605–c. 1650), an enslaved African man in the Virginia Colony. In July 1640, the Virginia Governor's Council sentenced him to serve for the remainder of his life as punishment for running away to Maryland. Many historians consider Punch the "first official slave in the English colonies," and his case as the "first legal sanctioning of lifelong slavery in the Chesapeake." Historians also consider this to be one of the first legal distinctions between Europeans and Africans made in the colony, and a key milestone in the development of the institution of slavery in the United States.
- John S. Jacobs (1815–1873), born into slavery in North Carolina, escaped, became an abolitionist speaker and author of a slave memoir. Brother of famed author Harriet Jacobs.
- John Smith (1580–1631), English soldier, sailor, and author best known for his role in the survival of the Jamestown colony in Virginia. Smith was captured by the Crimean Tatars in 1602 while fighting in Wallachia and enslaved by the Ottoman Empire, but escaped and returned to England by 1604. As Smith described it: "we all sold for slaves, like beasts in a market-place."
- Jordan Anderson (1825–1907), best known for a letter sent to his former oppressor/master in response to the latter's request that Jordan return to his service.
- Jordan Winston Early (1814–after 1894) was an American Methodist multiracial preacher who was the subject of a book about his life as a slave.
- John White, an enslaved black boy who was captured by Creeks in 1797 and escaped back to New Orleans, where he was returned to slavery by Spanish officials.
- John Ystumllyn, also known as Jac Du or Jack Black, an 18th-century Welsh gardener and the first well-recorded Black person of North Wales.
- Jonathan Strong, the subject of one of the earliest legal cases relating to slavery in Britain.
- José Antonio Aponte leader of the Aponte conspiracy.
- Joseph, important figure in the Old Testament and the Quran.
- Joseph Antonio Emidy (1775–1835), violinist and composer born in Africa, died in Cornwall.
- Joseph Cinqué (1814–1879), also known as Sengbe Pieh, leader of a slave rebellion on the slave ship La Amistad and defendant in the subsequent Supreme Court case United States v. Amistad in 1839.
- Joseph Jackson Fuller (1825–1908), one of the earliest enslaved persons to be freed in Jamaica, initially under the partial freedoms of the 1833 Slavery Abolition Act.
- Joseph Knight, successfully sought his freedom through a legal suit in Scotland in 1777, a case which established that Scots law would not uphold the institution of slavery.

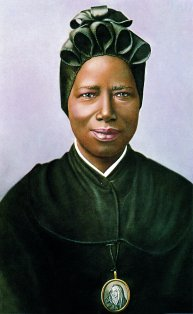
Josephine Bakhita

- Josephine Bakhita (c. 1869–1947), Sudanese-born Roman Catholic Canossian nun and saint.
- Joshua Glover, fugitive from slavery aided by abolitionists at Racine, Wisconsin in 1854.
- Josiah T. Walls (c. 1842–1905), formerly enslaved politician who served in both chambers of the Florida State Legislature and who became the first African American to represent the state in Congress

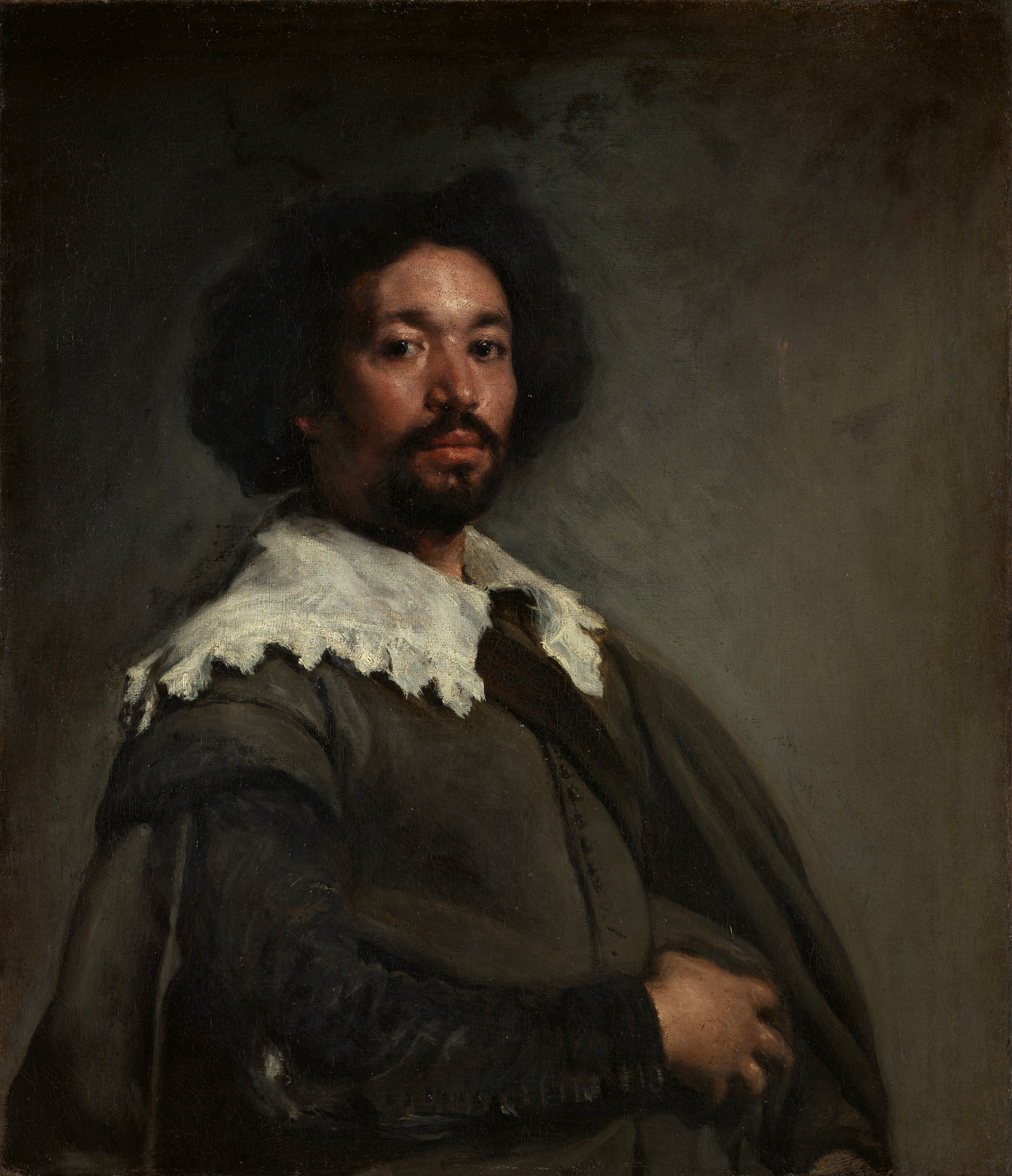
Juan de Pareja

- Juan de Pareja (1606–1670), man enslaved by Spanish artist Diego Velázquez. Velázquez trained him as a painter and freed him in 1650.
- Juan Francisco Manzano (c. 1797–1854), Cuban poet.
- Juan Gros, a free black soldier captured near Pensacola by an Upper Creek, who sold him to a white trader who sold him to Mitasuki chief Kinache, from whom Spaniards ransomed him.
- Juan Latino, called "el negro Juan Latino", from Ethiopia, brought to Spain as a child, received an education and rose to be professor of Latin at the University of Granada, in 16th-century Spain.
- Juan Ortiz, a young Andalusian nobleman enslaved by Chief Ucita in Florida to avenge injuries he suffered at the hands of the expedition Ortiz belonged to.
- Juan Valiente (died 1553), enslaved Black African on permission to be a conquistador. He died at the battle of Tucapel against Mapuche forces in Chile.
- Juana Ramírez (1790–1856), rebel soldier and heroine of the Venezuelan War of Independence.
- Julia Chinn, an octoroon enslaved woman and common-law wife of Richard Mentor Johnson, ninth Vice President of the United States.
- Julia Frances Lewis, mother of Amanda American Dickson by the son of her owner.
- Juliana, a Guaraní woman from present-day Paraguay, famous for killing her Spanish enslaver between 1538 and 1542 and urging other indigenous women to do the same.
- Julius Soubise (1754–1798) was a freed formerly enslaved Afro-Caribbean who became a well-known fop in late eighteenth-century Britain.
- Julius Zoilos, enslaved by Julius Caesar. After obtaining his freedom, he rose to prominence in his home city of Aphrodisias after Caesar's death.
- Jupiter Hammon (1711–before 1806), in 1761 became the first African-American writer to be published in the present-day United States. Born into slavery, Hammon was never emancipated. He is considered one of the founders of African-American literature.

== K ==
- Kunta Kinte (c. 1750–c. 1822), a character from the 1976 novel Roots: The Saga of an American Family whom author Alex Haley was based on one of his actual ancestors. Kinte was a man of the Mandinka people who grew up in a small village called Juffure in what is now The Gambia and was raised as a Muslim before being captured and enslaved in Virginia. The historical accuracy of Haley's story is disputed.
- Kodjo (c. 1803–1833), an enslaved Surinamese who was burnt alive for starting the 1832 fire in Paramaribo, Dutch Suriname, possibly as an act of resistance.

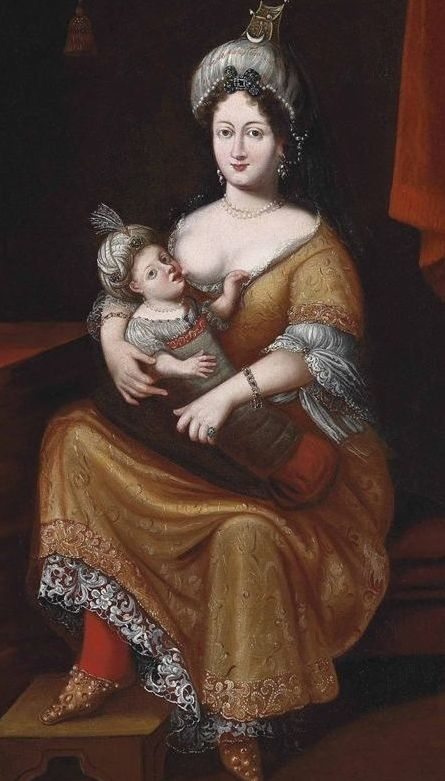
Kösem Sultan

- Kösem Sultan (1589–1651), an Ottoman enslaved woman, later extremely powerful as wife, then mother and later grandmother of the Ottoman sultan during the Sultanate of Women.

== L ==
- Lalla Balqis (1670–after 1721), an Englishwoman captured and enslaved by corsairs and included in the harem of the Sultan of Morocco.
- Lamhatty, a Tawasa Indian captured and enslaved by Creek; he escaped.
- Lampegia (died after 730), Aquitanian noblewoman, captured by Abd al-Rahman ibn Abd Allah al-Ghafiqi, who in 730 took the Llivia Fortress, executed her spouse Munuza and sent her to be enslaved in the harem of Hisham ibn Abd al-Malik in Damascus.

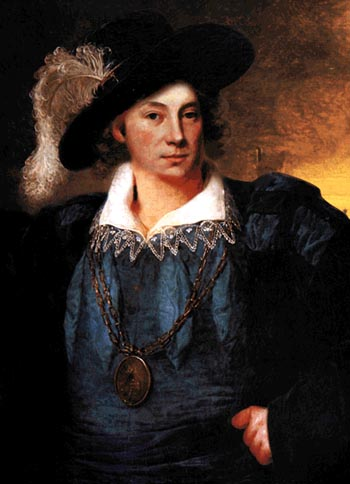
Laurens de Graaf

- Laurens de Graaf (c. 1653–1704), a Dutch pirate, mercenary, and naval officer, enslaved by Spanish slave traders when captured in what is now the Netherlands and transported to the Canary Islands to work on a plantation, prior to 1674.
- Lear Green (c. 1839–1860), an African-American woman from Maryland who escaped to freedom in New York by mailing herself in a box.
- Leo Africanus (1494–1554), a Moor born in Granada who was taken by his family in 1498 to Morocco when expelled from Spain. As an adult he served on diplomatic missions. Captured by Crusaders while in the Middle East, he was enslaved in Rome and forced to convert to Christianity. He eventually regained his freedom and lived out his life in Tunis.
- Leofgifu the dairy maid, an enslaved woman in Anglo-Saxon England, named in her manumission.
- Leoflaed, an enslaved woman in Anglo-Saxon England, whose freedom was bought by a man who described her as a "kinswoman."
- Leonor de Mendoza, an enslaved woman in colonial Mexico who tried to marry Tomás Ortega, a man enslaved by another master; when her master imprisoned Tomás she appealed to a church court for assistance, which threatened excommunication if he did not free Tomás.
- Letitia Munson (c. 1820–after 1882), midwife and formerly enslaved, she was acquitted of performing an illegal abortion in Canada.
- Lewis Adams (1842–1905), a formerly-enslaved man who co-founded the Tuskegee Institute, now Tuskegee University, in Alabama.
- Lewis Hayden (1811–1889), African-American man born in Kentucky, later elected to the Massachusetts General Court.
- Lilliam Williams, a Tennessee settler who was captured by the Creek while pregnant. The Creek adopted her daughter (whom she named Molly and they named Esnahatchee,); they kept the girl when Williams' freedom was arranged.
- Liol, a Chinese man enslaved by Mongol bannerman Soosar. He was rewarded with semi-independent status, as a separate register dependent. In 1735, his son Fuji tried to claim that he and his brother were in fact Manchus and detached household bannermen, but failed.
- Lorenzo de Apapis (c. 1501–1586), Gozitan priest and notary who was enslaved during the 1551 Ottoman attack on Gozo. He was ransomed and freed by 1553.
- Lott Cary (c. 1780–1828), born an enslaved African-American in Virginia, bought his freedom c. 1813, emigrated to Liberia in 1822, where he later served as colonial administrator.
- Louis Hughes (1832–1913), African-American man who escaped slavery, author, and businessman
- Lovisa von Burghausen (1698–1733), Swedish writer who published an account of being enslaved in Russia after being taken prisoner during the Great Northern War.
- Lucius Agermus, freedman of Agrippina the Elder.
- Lucius Aurelius Hermia, a freedman butcher whose tombstone glorifies his marriage with his fellow freedwoman Aurelia Philematium.
- Lucius Cancrius Primigenius, a freedman of Clemens in an inscription praising him for breaking spells against the city.
- Lucius of Campione, who lost a lawsuit in the 8th century over a man Toto's claimed ownership of him.
- Lucy, the black woman enslaved by John Lang. She was taken captive by the Creek when 12 years old and kept in slavery in Creek territory, where she had children and grandchildren who were also enslaved.
- Lucy Ann (Berry) Delaney (1830–1891), formerly-enslaved woman, daughter of Polly Berry.
- Lucy Higgs Nichols (1838–1915), escaped slavery, served as a nurse in the Civil War, member of the Grand Army of the Republic.
- Lucy Terry (c. 1733–1821), Kidnapped in Africa and enslaved, she was taken to the British colony of Rhode Island. She later gained freedom and became a poet.
- Luís Gama (1830–1882), born free in Brazil, illegally sold into slavery as a child, he regained liberty as an adult and became a lawyer who freed hundreds from slavery without asking for recompense, notably in the Netto Case.
- Lunsford Lane (1803–after 1870), an enslaved African-American man and entrepreneur from North Carolina who bought freedom for himself and his family. He also wrote a slave narrative.
- Lyde, an enslaved woman freed by Roman empress Livia.
- Lydia, an enslaved woman who was shot and wounded by her captor when she struggled to escape a whipping. The action was ruled legal by the Supreme Court of North Carolina in 1830 (see North Carolina v. Mann).
- Lydia Carter, the "Little Osage Captive," captured and enslaved among the Cherokee. She was ransomed by Lydia Carter, who made her her namesake. The Osage attempted to reclaim her, but she took ill and died.
- Lydia Polite, mother of Robert Smalls.

== M ==
- Macuncuzade Mustafa Efendi (born c. 1550s), Ottoman qadi and poet who was enslaved in Malta after the ship he was on was captured by the Knights Hospitaller in 1597. He was ransomed and freed in 1600, and he wrote a narrative about his captivity.
- Madison Hemings (1805–1877), son of Sally Hemings and Thomas Jefferson.
- Mãe Judith (died 1940), West African woman who was taken to Brazil and became a Mãe-de-santo (priestess) in the disaporic Afro-Brazilian religion Candomblé.
- Mae Louise Miller (1943–2014), American woman kept in modern-day slavery (peonage) until 1961.
- Malgarida (born c. 1488), black African woman and companion of the conquistador Diego de Almagro. In 1536 she became the first non-indigenous woman to enter the territory of what is now Chile.
- Malik Ambar, born in 1548 as Chapu, a birth-name in Harar, Adal Sultanate in modern-day Ethiopia. He was from the now extinct Maya ethnic group. As a child he was sold in slavery by his parents Mir Qasim Al Baghdadi, one of his slave owners, eventually converted Chapu to Islam and gave him the name Ambar, after recognizing his superior intellectual qualities. Malik was brought enslaved to India While in India he created a mercenary force numbering up to 1500 men. It was based in the Deccan region and was hired by local kings. Malik became a popular Prime Minister of the Ahmadnagar Sultanate, showing administrative acumen. He is also regarded as a pioneer in guerilla warfare in the region. He is credited with carrying out a revenue settlement of much of the Deccan, which formed the basis for subsequent settlements. He is a figure of veneration to the Siddis of Gujarat. He humbled the might of the Mughals and Adil Shah of Bijapur and raised the low status of the Nizam Shah.
- La Malinche (c. 1496/1501–c. 1529), a Nahua woman enslaved by Spanish conquistador Hernán Cortés. She became his personal interpreter, advisor, and mistress during the Spanish conquest of Mexico.
- Mammy Lou (1804–after 1918), a formerly-enslaved woman who lived to extreme old age and acted in the 1918 silent film The Glorious Adventure.
- Manes, a man enslaved by Diogenes of Sinope. He ran away shortly after his owner arrived in Athens, and Diogenes failed to pursue him on the grounds that if Manes could live without him, it would be disgraceful if he could not equally live without Manes.
- Manjeok, enslaved Korean person and leader of an abortive slave uprising.
- Manjutakin (died 1007), a Turkish-born enslaved soldier (ghulam) and general of the Fatimids.
- Mann, either of two men enslaved by Æthelgifu in Anglo-Saxon England and freed by the terms of her will. One was a goldsmith and the other's wife was freed at the same time.
- Marcos Xiorro, a man enslaved in Puerto Rico who, in 1821, planned a revolt against the sugar plantation owners and the Spanish colonial government. Though the conspiracy was unsuccessful, he became a part of island's folklore.
- Marcia (died 193), mistress of Roman emperor Commodus.
- Marcius Agrippa (late 2nd and early 3rd century), an enslaved man who was not only freed but eventually elevated to senatorial rank by Roman emperor Macrinus.
- Marcus Tullius Tiro (c. 103–4 BCE), Roman author, enslaved person, and secretary of the Roman politician Cicero, later freed. He invented a long-lasting system of shorthand and wrote books that are now lost.
- Margaret Garner (1835–1858), an enslaved woman in antebellum America infamous for killing her own daughter rather than see the child returned to slavery.
- Margaret Himfi (before 1380–after 1408), a Hungarian noblewoman who was abducted and enslaved by Ottoman marauders in the late 14th century. She later became an enslaved mistress of a wealthy Venetian citizen of Crete, with whom she had two daughters. Margaret returned to Hungary in 1405.
- Margaret Morgan, involved in the Prigg v. Pennsylvania United States Supreme Court case in which the court held that the federal Fugitive Slave Act precluded a Pennsylvania state law that prohibited blacks from being taken out of Pennsylvania into slavery, and overturned the conviction of Edward Prigg as a result.
- Marguerite Duplessis (c. 1718–after 1740), a Pawnee woman enslaved in Montreal who, in 1740, unsuccessfully sued for her freedom.
- Marguerite Scypion (c. 1770s–after 1836), an African-Natchez woman born into slavery in St. Louis who sued for and eventually won her freedom.
- Maria al-Qibtiyya (died 637), also known as "Maria the Copt" or, alternatively, Maria Qupthiya, an enslaved Copt who was sent as a gift from Muqawqis, a Byzantine official, to the Islamic prophet Muhammad in 628, and became Muhammad's slave concubine. She was the mother of Muhammad's son Ibrahim, who died in infancy. Her sister, Sirin, was also sent to Muhammad. Muhammad gave her to his follower Hassan ibn Thabit. Maria died five years after Muhammad's death in 632.
- Maria (died 1716), the leader of a slave rebellion on Curaçao.
- Maria Bohuslavka (17th century), Ukrainian woman enslaved in a harem, and became a heroine of assisting the escape of 30 Cossacks from slavery.
- Maria Guyomar de Pinha (1664–1728), Siamese royal chef of Japanese-Portuguese ancestry.
- Maria Perkins, an enslaved woman from Virginia who wrote a letter to her husband in 1852 about their son being sold away.
- Maria ter Meetelen (1704–after 1751), Dutch writer of a slave narrative, enslaved by pirates and sold to the Sultan of Morocco. Her 1748 biography is considered to be a valuable witness statement of the life of a formerly enslaved person.
- Mariah Bell Winder McGavock Otey Reddick (died 1922), as a girl she was given as a wedding gift to Carrie Winder when she married John McGavock in 1848 in Terrebonne Parish, Louisiana. Mariah, born enslaved in Mississippi, was taken to Franklin, Tennessee, where she lived for most of the remainder of her life. She was matched with Harvey Otey after his first wife Phebe died. They had several children, including two sets of twins, born into slavery. During the Civil War, she was sent to Montgomery to be far from Union lines and possible freedom. She has been featured in three novels: Widow of the South and Orphan Mother both by Robert Hicks and in a book by her great-grandson William 'Damani' Keene and his wife Carole 'Ife' Keene entitled Clandestine: The Times and Secret Life of Mariah Otey Reddick.
- Marianna Malińska (died after 1797), Polish serf and Royal Ballet Dancer, donated to the king of Poland by will and testament.
- Marie (died 1759), an enslaved Cree woman sentenced to death in Trois-Rivières, New France.
- Marie-Cessette Dumas, a woman enslaved by Marquis Antoine de la Pailleterie, mother of General Thomas-Alexandre Dumas, and grandmother of famous author Alexandre Dumas, père.
- Marie-Josèphe dite Angélique (died 1734), a black Portuguese enslaved woman who was tried and convicted, beaten and hanged for setting fire to her female owner's home, burning much of what is now referred to as Old Montreal.
- Marie Thérèse Metoyer, a planter, and businesswoman at the colonial Louisiana outpost of Natchitoches after being freed.
- Mark, Massachusetts man enslaved by Captain John Codman. Mark's body was displayed in chains publicly near Charlestown, Massachusetts for twenty years. The gruesome display of his body was so well known at the time, the site where Mark's body was displayed is mentioned by Paul Revere as a landmark, in his 1798 account of Revere's 1775 midnight ride.
- Martha Ann Erskine Ricks (1817–1901), an African-American born enslaved in Tennessee, later an Americo-Liberian quilter
- Marthe Franceschini (1755–1799), an Italian captured and enslaved by Corsairs and included in the harem of the Sultan of Morocco.
- Mary, mother of George Washington Carver.
- Mary (died 1838), teenager hanged for the murder of Vienna Brinker, a two-year-old girl she was babysitting
- Mary Black, one of three enslaved women charged with witchcraft during the Salem witch trials of 1692.
- Mary Calhoun, white woman and cousin of John C. Calhoun who was kidnapped by Cherokee. She never returned home.
- Mary Edmonson (1832–1853), along with her sister Emily, joined an unsuccessful 1848 escape attempt known as the Pearl incident, but Henry Ward Beecher and his church raised the funds to free them.
- Mary Eliza Smith, described in various records as "slave" or "former slave," common-law wife of Michael Morris Healy and mother of his children, including James Augustine Healy, Patrick Francis Healy, Michael A. Healy, and Eliza Healy.
- Mary Fields (c. 1832–1914): the first African-American female star route mail carrier in the United States.
- Mary Mildred Williams, Nee Botts (born 1847), the original 'Poster Child' whose image was used to advance the abolitionist cause by propagandising 'White Slavery' in 1855.
- Mary Prince (c. 1788–after 1833), the account of her life galvanized the anti-slavery movement in England.
- The Master of Morton and the eldest son of the Chief of Clan Oliphant, two Scottish nobles who were exiled from Scotland after being implicated in the 1582 Raid of Ruthven. The ship in which they sailed was lost at sea, and it was rumoured that they had been caught by a Dutch ship. The last report was that they were enslaved on a Turkish ship in the Mediterranean. A plaque to their memory was raised in the church in Algiers.
- Masúd, initially purchased as a youth by Khál-i Akbar, an uncle of the Báb, Masúd would serve Bahá'u'lláh in Acre.
- Matilda McCrear (c. 1857–1940), the last surviving victim in the United States of the Transatlantic slave trade. Transported upon the slave ship Clotilda.
- Mende Nazer (born c. 1982), a Nuba woman captured in Darfur and transported from Sudan to London, where she eventually won refugee status and wrote the memoir Slave: My True Story (2002).
- Menecrates of Tralles (1st century BC), Greek physician.
- Metaneira, a woman in ancient Greece described in Against Neaera as the property of Nicarete, who prostituted her.
- Michael Shiner (1805–1880), enslaved laborer, painter entrepreneur, civic leader and diarist at the Washington Navy Yard.
- Miguel de Buría (c. 1510–c. 1555), enslaved person and rebel.
- Miguel Perez was the Spanish name of a boy of the Yojuane people who was among 149 Yojuane women and children taken captive in 1759 during an attack on their camp by an expedition of Spaniards and Apaches along the Red River in what is now northern Texas. Many of the captives died of smallpox while those who survived were enslaved. The boy was sold to a Spanish soldier who bestowed the Spanish name on him. Perez became an Hispanicized Indian of San Antonio but he continued to maintain contact with the Yojuanes. In 1786, Perez was recruited to convince the Yojuanes and their Tonkawa allies to go to war with the Lipan Apache, which he did successfully.
- Mikhail Matinsky (1750–1820), Russian serf scientist, dramatist, librettist and opera composer.
- Michał Rymiński (died after 1797), Polish serf and Royal Ballet Dancer, donated to the king of Poland by will and testament.

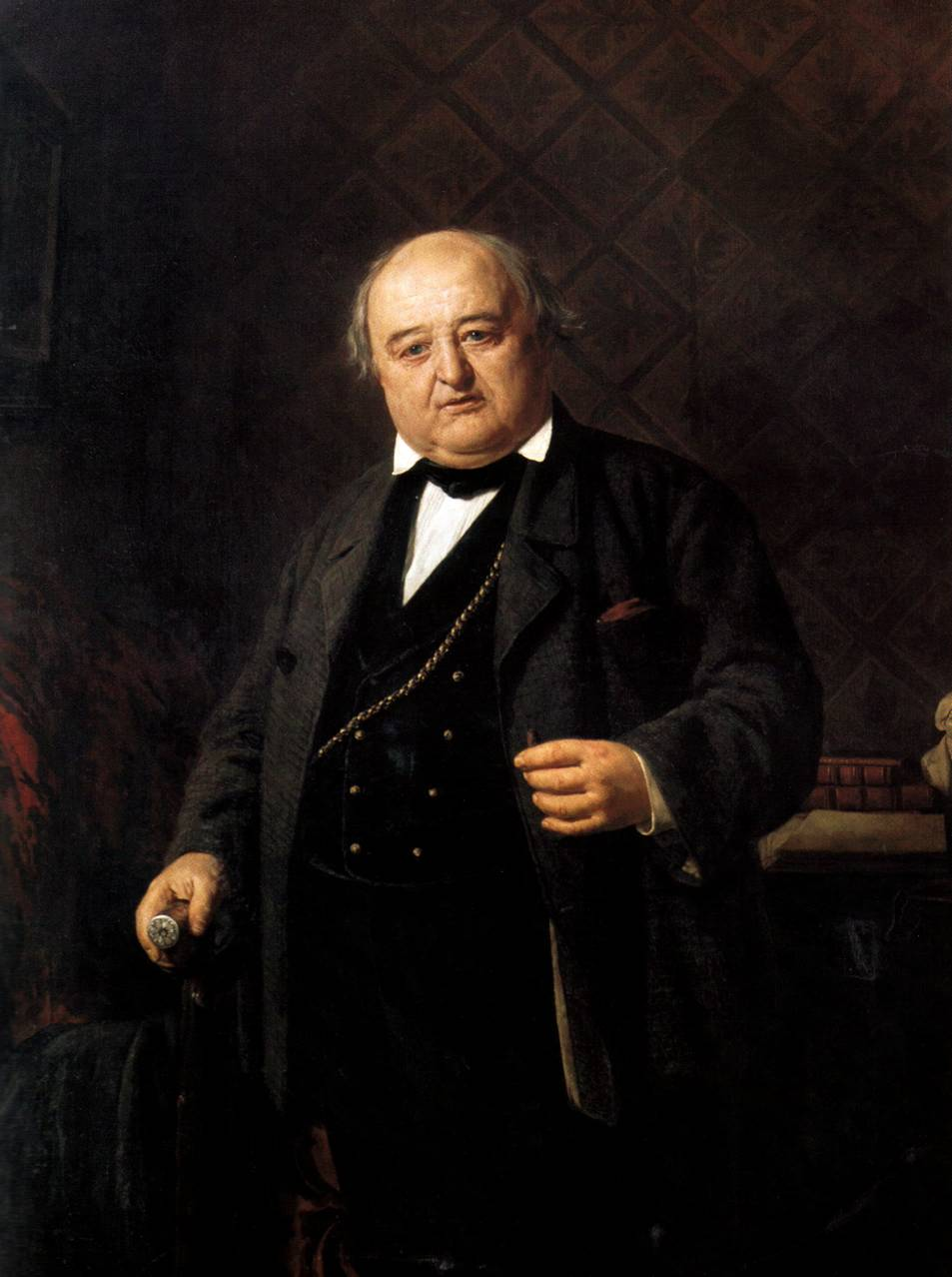
Mikhail Shchepkin

- Mikhail Shchepkin (1788–1863), Russian serf actor.
- Mikhail Shibanov, Russian serf painter active during the 1780s.
- Mikhail Tikhanov (1789–1862), Russian serf artist.
- Mina Kolokolnikov (1708?–1775?), Russian serf painter and teacher.
- Mingo, the 15–16 years old boy enslaved by the Titsworth family in Tennessee, who was captured in 1794 by Creeks in a raid on the house and kept enslaved by them.
- Minerva (Anderson) Breedlove, mother of Madam C.J. Walker.
- Moses A. Hopkins (1846–1886), African-American diplomat, U.S. minister to Liberia.

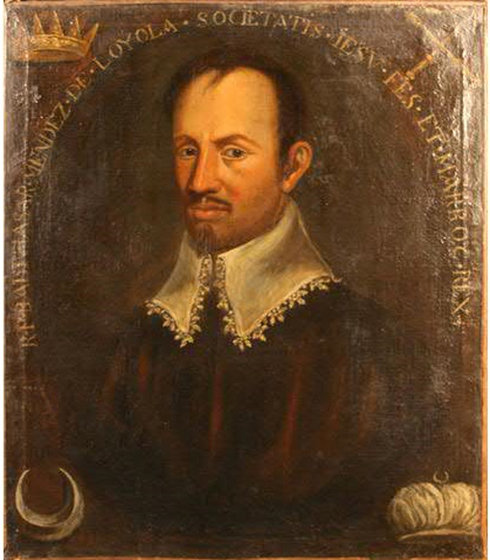
Muhammad el-Attaz

- Muhammad el-Attaz (1631–1667), Moroccan prince who was enslaved in Malta from 1651 to 1656. He later converted to Christianity, adopted the name Baldassare Diego Loyola and became a Jesuit priest.
- Murad Agha (c. 1480–c. 1556), Italian-born Ottoman eunuch and naval officer who became Beylerbey of Tripoli
- Mustafa (c. 1708 – c. 1751/1763), Ottoman Pasha of Rhodes who was enslaved in Malta after the Lupa revolt in January 1748. He was freed in May 1749, and attempted to instigate a slave rebellion in June 1749.
- Mustapha Khaznadar (1817–1878), born Georgios Halkias Stravelakis, a Christian Greek on the island of Chios, captured by Ottoman troops during the 1822 Massacre of Chios, converted to Islam and given the name Mustapha, sold in Constantinople to an envoy of the Husainid Dynasty. He was raised by the family of Mustapha Bey, then by his son Ahmad I Bey while he was still crown prince. Initially, he worked as the prince's private treasurer before becoming Ahmad's state treasurer (khaznadar). He managed to climb to the highest offices of the Tunisian state, married Princess Lalla Kalthoum in 1839 and was promoted to lieutenant-general of the army, made bey in 1840 and then president of the Grand Council from 1862 to 1878.
- Muyahid ibn Yusuf ibn Ali (11th century), leader of the Saqaliba (enslaved persons of supposed Slavic origin) in Dénia, Spain (then part of Muslim Al Andalus). Taking advantage of the crumbling of the Caliphate of Córdoba, he and his followers rebelled, freed themselves, seized control of the city and established the Taifa of Dénia, a city-state which at its peak extended its reach as far as the island of Mallorca.

== N ==
- Nafisa al-Bayda (fl. 1768–1816), Egyptian investor and diplomat, referred to as a "white slave", originally bought and enslaved as a concubine.
- Nancy, otherwise called Ann, the plaintiff in the 1799 New Brunswick habeas corpus suit R v Jones
- nancy brown Nancy Caffrey, a white captive enslaved by a Creek. When trader John O'Reilly attempted to ransom her and Elsey Thompson, he was told they were not taken captive to be allowed to go back, but to work.
- Nanny of the Maroons, also known as Granny Nanny and Queen Nanny, Jamaican Maroons leader.
- Nat Turner (1800–1831), escaped and led revolt in Southampton County, Virginia.
- Nathan McMillian, who as a freedman sued for the admission of his children to a local "Croatan Indian" school on the grounds that it was for all non-white children, and that his children had Croatan blood on their mother's side.
- Nathaniel Booth (1826–1901), escaped slavery in Virginia and settled in Lowell, Massachusetts. In 1851, the citizens of Lowell purchased his freedom from slave hunters.
- Neaera, a formerly-enslaved woman and prostitute whom the Athenian Stephanus married against the law c. 340 BC, according to a speech of Demosthenes.
- Nero Hawley (1742–1817), a formerly-enslaved freeperson who served in the Continental Army during the American Revolutionary War and was buried in Trumbull, Connecticut.
- Newport Gardner (1746–1826), a formerly-enslaved freeperson in colonial Newport, Rhode Island.
- Ng Akew (died 1880), a Tanka enslaved woman in British Hong Kong famed for a piracy scandal.
- Nicarete, a woman in ancient Greece, described in Against Neaera the freedwoman of Charisius the Elean and the wife of his cook Hippias, and as owning and prostituting several women c. 340 BC.
- Nilüfer Hatun (died c. 1363), enslaved person of probable Greek origin in the Ottoman Imperial Harem and mother of sultan Murad I.
- Nino (c. 280–c. 332), a 4th-century Roman woman from Constantinople who is greatly venerated for having brought Christianity to Georgia. By some of the accounts of her life, she originally came to Georgia enslaved and kidnapped from her homeland.
- Nurbanu Sultan (c. 1525–1583), née Cecilia Venier-Baffo, an enslaved Venetian noblewoman who became the most favored wife of Ottoman sultan Selim II and the highly influential mother of sultan Murad III.

== O ==
- Oenomaus, a Gallic gladiator and one of the leaders of rebellious enslaved persons during the Third Servile War.
- Olaudah Equiano (c. 1745–1797), also known as Gustavus Vassa, a prominent African-British author and figure in the abolitionist cause whose birthplace is heavily contested.

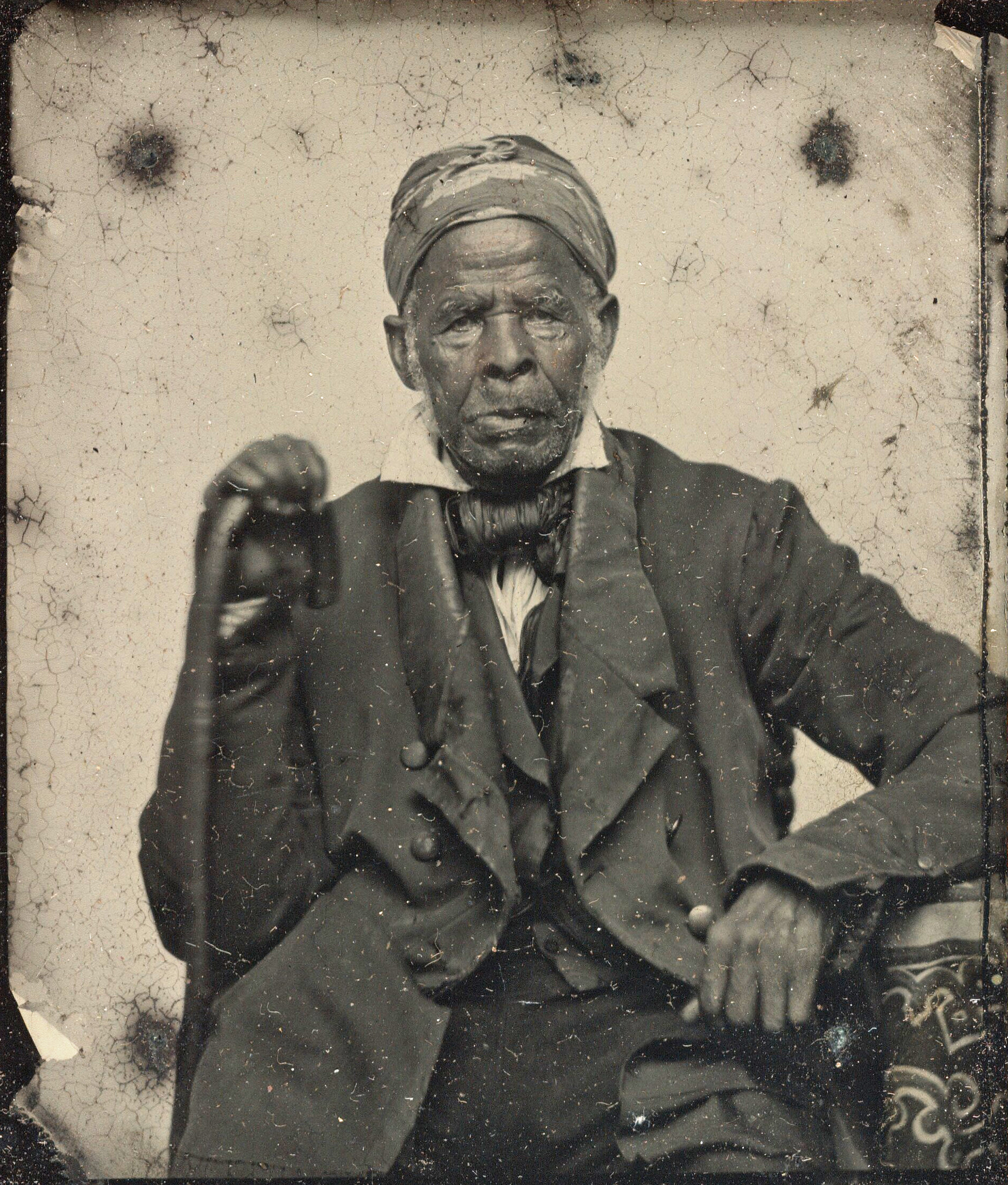
Omar ibn Said

- Omar ibn Said (1770–1864), a writer and Islamic scholar from Senegal who was enslaved and transported to the United States in 1807, where he spent the rest of his life enslaved.
- Onesimus, enslaved by Philemon of Colossae who ran away and, having met St. Paul, was converted by him. Paul sent him back to the Christian Philemon with a letter, which is the Epistle to Philemon. Ignatius of Antioch mentions an Onesimus as Bishop of Ephesus in the early 2nd century, but it is not certain that these are the same men.
- Onesimus, an enslaved person in colonial Boston who was instrumental in spreading knowledge about inoculation against smallpox.
- Onesimos Nesib (c. 1856–1931), an Ethiopian bought out of slavery by Swedish missionaries when he was a boy. He went on to work with another formerly enslaved by Aster Ganno to translate the Bible into the Oromo language.
- Oney Judge (1773–1848), enslaved by the family of Martha Washington, and then by the First Lady herself, Judge worked at Mount Vernon and elsewhere as a personal servant to Martha Washington until she escaped in 1796 to Portsmouth New Hampshire.

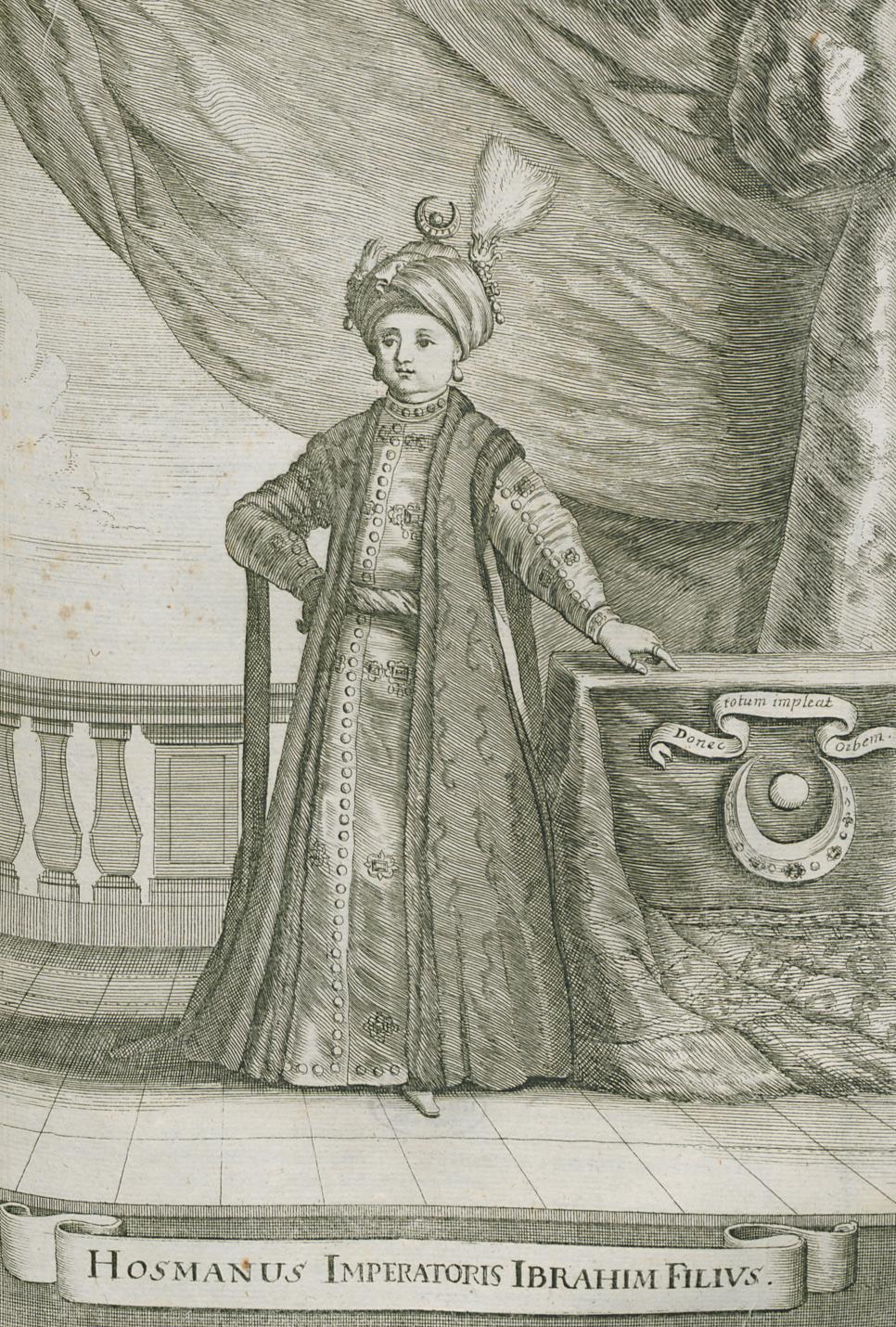
Osman

- Osman (1642–1676), alleged son of Ottoman sultan Ibrahim and Zafire Hatun. At a young age, he was captured in a naval battle in 1644 and was briefly enslaved by the Knights Hospitaller on Malta until his possible identity was revealed and he was released by Giovanni Paolo Lascaris. Later in life, he converted to Christianity, adopted the name Domenico di San Tommaso and became a Dominican friar.
- Ottobah Cugoano, also known as John Stuart (c. 1757–after 1791), was an abolitionist, political activist, and natural rights philosopher from West Africa who was active in Britain.
- Owen Fitzpen (c. 1582–1636), an English merchant who was taken captive by Barbary pirates in 1620 and subsequently escaped.
- Owen Breedlove, father of Madam C.J. Walker.

== P ==
- Pallas, secretary to Roman emperor Claudius.
- Pasion, an enslaved Athenian man and banker. Late in life, he received the rare honor for a freedman of citizenship.
- Pata Seca (real name Roque José Florêncio), born in Angola in 1828, captured and brought to Brazil enslaved, was a very tall, muscular and strong man: 2m18 tall and over 140 kgs weight. He was forced to work as a breeder, fathering over 200 children. When slavery was abolished in Brazil in 1888, he received a plot of land, where he lived out his life with his wife and 9 children.
- Saint Patrick, abducted from Britain, enslaved in Ireland, escaped to Britain, returned to Ireland as a missionary.
- Patsey (born c. 1830), an enslaved African-American person who lived in the mid-1800s in South Carolina.
- Paul Jennings (1799–1874), personal servant enslaved by President James Madison during and after his White House years, bought his freedom in 1845 from Daniel Webster. Noted for publishing the first White House memoir, 1865's A Colored Man's Reminiscences of James Madison.
- Paul Smith, a free black who accused the Cherokee headman Doublehead of kidnapping him and forcing him into bondage.
- Pedro Camejo (1790–1821), Venezuelan soldier in the Venezuelan War of Independence.
- Peggy Margaret Titsworth, enslaved at 13 years for three years, after a Creek raid in 1794 on her Tennessee home.
- Pehr Philander (1758–1811), enslaved as a young boy by the Dutch East India Company but later purchased free and brought to Sweden.

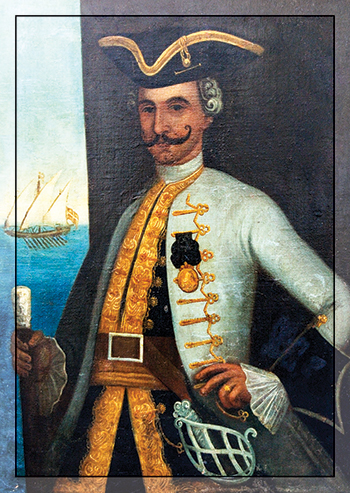
Petar Želalić

- Petar Želalić (c. 1731–1811), enslaved Montenegrin on board the Ottoman ship Corona Ottomana who led a successful revolt in 1760. He later became a corsair in Hospitaller Malta.
- Pete and Hannah Byrne, freed enslaved persons of the Napoleon Bonaparte Byrne family which traveled from Missouri to California overland (a six-month journey) in 1859, leaving the farm in Missouri and bringing six adults (including Pete & Hannah), the four Byrne children and a herd of cattle and settling in Berkeley, California. Pete and Hannah are considered the first blacks living in Berkeley and among the first African-Americans in California.
- Peter Salem (c. 1750–1816), African American born into slavery in Massachusetts, served as a soldier in the American Revolutionary War
- Petronia Justa, a woman in Herculaneum who sued her owner claiming to have been born after her mother's emancipation; the records of the lawsuit were preserved by the eruption of Vesuvius.
- Phaedo of Elis, captured in war, enslaved in Athens and forced into prostitution, became a pupil of Socrates who had him freed, gave his name to one of Plato's dialogues, Phaedo and became a famous philosopher in his own right.
- Phaedrus (c. 15 BCE–c. 50 CE), Roman fabulist.
- Phillis (died 1755), a Massachusetts woman enslaved by Captain John Codman. Convicted in the successful plot to poison her owner as she and her fellow enslaved "found the rigid discipline of their master unendurable", Phillis was burned to death in 1755.
- Phillis Wheatley (1753–1784?), Colonial American poet, the second published African-American poet and first published African-American woman.
- Phoebe, an enslaved woman who sued for her freedom in Tennessee, along with her sons Davy and Tom, claiming to be the descendants of an enslaved Indian woman whose sister and other relatives had proven that they were wrongly enslaved.
- Philocrates, enslaved by 2nd-century BCE Roman reformer Gaius Gracchus. He remained at his master's side when Gracchus was fleeing from his enemies, forsaken by everybody else. Arriving at a grove sacred to the Furies, Philocrates first assisted Gracchus in his suicide before taking his own life, though some rumors held that Philocrates was only killed after he refused to let go of his master's body.
- Phormion, an enslaved Athenian man and banker. Late in life, he received the rare honor for a freedman of citizenship.
- Pierre d'Espagnac, sometimes Pierre d'Espagnal (1650–1689) was a French Jesuit missionary, enslaved by the Siamese.
- Pope Pius I (died c. 154), the Bishop of Rome from about 140 to about 154, during the reign of Roman emperor Antoninus Pius. He was the brother of the freedman Hermas and therefore likely to have been a former slave himself, though that is not mentioned explicitly in the scant records of his life.
- Pleasant Richardson, escaped slavery and became a Union soldier and property owner in Fincastle, Virginia.
- Polly Berry, also known as Polly Crockett and Polly Wash, won an 1843 freedom suit in St. Louis, Missouri and also gained the freedom of her daughter Lucy Ann Berry.
- Polly Strong, the subject of the 1820 Indiana Supreme Court case Polly v. Lasselle, which resulted in all slaves held within Indiana to be freed.
- Politoria, the subject of a lead curse tablet in ancient Rome; it was a curse on Clodia Valeria Sophrone, that she should not get Politoria into her power. She appears to have been a slave-courtesan who feared being sent to the brothel.

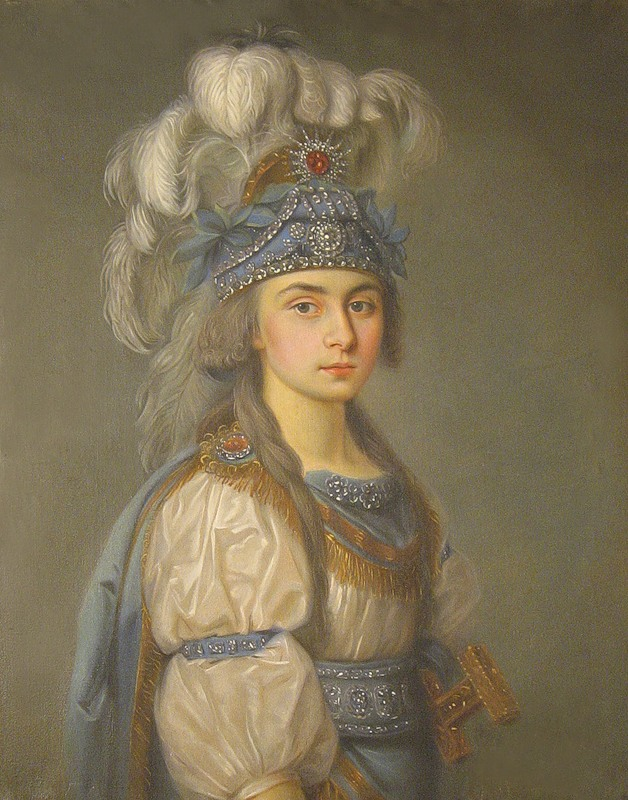
Praskovia Kovalyova-Zhemchugova

- Praskovia Kovalyova-Zhemchugova (1768–1803) was a Russian serf actress and soprano opera singer.
- Primus Fowle (1700–1791), enslaved by Daniel Fowle of Portsmouth, New Hampshire. Primus operated the press for the New Hampshire Gazette which is the American newspaper in longest continuous print.
- Prince was the slave of a Choctaw man named Richard Harkins. Angered that his owner failed to give his slaves a Christmas celebration, Prince brutally murdered him and then unceremoniously dumped the body into the river in 1858.
- Prince Boston (born 1750), sued for and won his freedom in a 1773 U.S. jury trial
- Prince Estabrook (1741–1830), enslaved by Benjamin Estabrook; fought in the Continental Army and was wounded at the Battle of Lexington and Concord
- Prince Whipple (1750–1796), enslaved by American General William Whipple
- Prosper, an enslaved man murdered in 1807 in Virgin Islands by his owner Arthur William Hodge, for which Hodge was tried and executed in 1811, the first (and virtually only) such case ever recorded.
- A pregnant Thrall whose name is not preserved, who was fleeing for her life in 11th-century Oslo, was given refuge on the boat of Hallvard Vebjørnsson, who tried to shield her but was killed together with her by the attackers' arrows, for which he was canonised and became the patron saint of Oslo.
- Publilius Syrus (fl. 85–43 BCE), a Latin writer best known for his sententiae. He was a Syrian who was brought as a slave to Italy.

== Q ==
- Quamina Gladstone, father of Jack Gladstone and implicated in the Demerara rebellion of 1823.
- Quassi van Timotebo or Kwasimukamba (1692–1787) Surinamese slave, freedman and Maroon hunter in Dutch Surinam. His name is given to the plant genus Quassia.
- Quock Walker, also known as Kwaku or Quok Walker, sued for and won his freedom in 1781 in a case citing language in the new Massachusetts Constitution (1780) that declared all men to be born free and equal.
- Qutb ud-Din Aibak (1150–1210), a formerly-enslaved Turk, became a soldier, the first of the Sultans of Delhi, founder of India's "slave dynasty".

== R ==
- Rachel, the subject of the 1834 Rachel v. Walker case in the Supreme Court of Missouri which ruled that a U.S. Army officer forfeited his slave if he took the person to territory where slavery is prohibited. This ruling was cited as precedent in 1856 in the Dred Scott v. Sandford case before the Supreme Court of the United States.
- Rachel of Kittery, Maine (died 1695), enslaved woman murdered by her owner whose case set a legal precedent in New England.
- Rachel Knight (died 1889), initially enslaved by the grandfather of Newton Knight, the well-known Southern Unionist who during the American Civil War defied the Confederacy in the rebellion known as the Free State of Jones. After the war, Rachel was emancipated along with the other slaves. By the mid-1870s, Knight had separated from his wife, Serena, and married Rachel. In this period, Knight's grown son, Mat (from his first wife), married Rachel's grown daughter, Fannie, from a previous union. Knight's daughter, Molly, married Rachel's son, Jeff, making three interracial families in the community. Newton and Rachel Knight had several children before her death in 1889.
- Rebecca Huger, an enslaved woman who was freed by General Benjamin F. Butler in New Orleans, and described in a Harper's Weekly article as being to all appearance white, and having come to a school for emancipated slaves in Philadelphia.
- Redoshi (c. 1848–1937), also known as Sally Smith, the next-to-last surviving victim in the United States of the Transatlantic slave trade. Transported upon the slave ship Clotilda.
- Regina, a Romano-British freedwoman known from her tombstone at Arbeia.
- Rei Amador, leader of a slave rebellion in 1595 in Portuguese São Tomé and Príncipe.
- Remigio Herrera (c. 1810s–1905), an enslaved Cuban person who became a revered priest in Regla.
- Reytory Angola (c. 1626–1689), freed slave from New Amsterdam.
- Richard Preston (c. 1791–1861), escaped slavery to become a religious leader and abolitionist in Nova Scotia.
- Robert Blake, earned the Medal of Honor as a sailor during the American Civil War, after becoming a "contraband" (i.e. a slave freed by Unionist forces) and enlisting.
- Robert Drury (1687–1743/1750), an English sailor who was shipwrecked on the island of Madagascar in 1702, and remained enslaved there until 1717.
- Robert J. Patterson (1809–1884), escaped slavery in Virginia to become a restaurateur in Saint John, New Brunswick.
- Robert Smalls (1839–1915), commandeered a Confederate ship leading the ship and its enslaved captives to freedom, causing the Union to allow African Americans to enlist; later served as a member of the South Carolina Senate before serving in the U.S. House of Representatives representing South Carolina's 5th congressional district.
- Robin and Polly Holmes, the plaintiffs in the 1853 Holmes v. Ford court case in the Oregon Territory that freed their children. The decision re-affirmed that slavery was illegal in the territory as outlined in the Organic Laws of Oregon that were continued once the region became a U.S. territory.
- Rosina Downs, an enslaved woman who was freed by General Benjamin F. Butler in New Orleans, and described in a Harper's Weekly article as being to all appearance white, and having come to a school for emancipated slaves in Philadelphia.

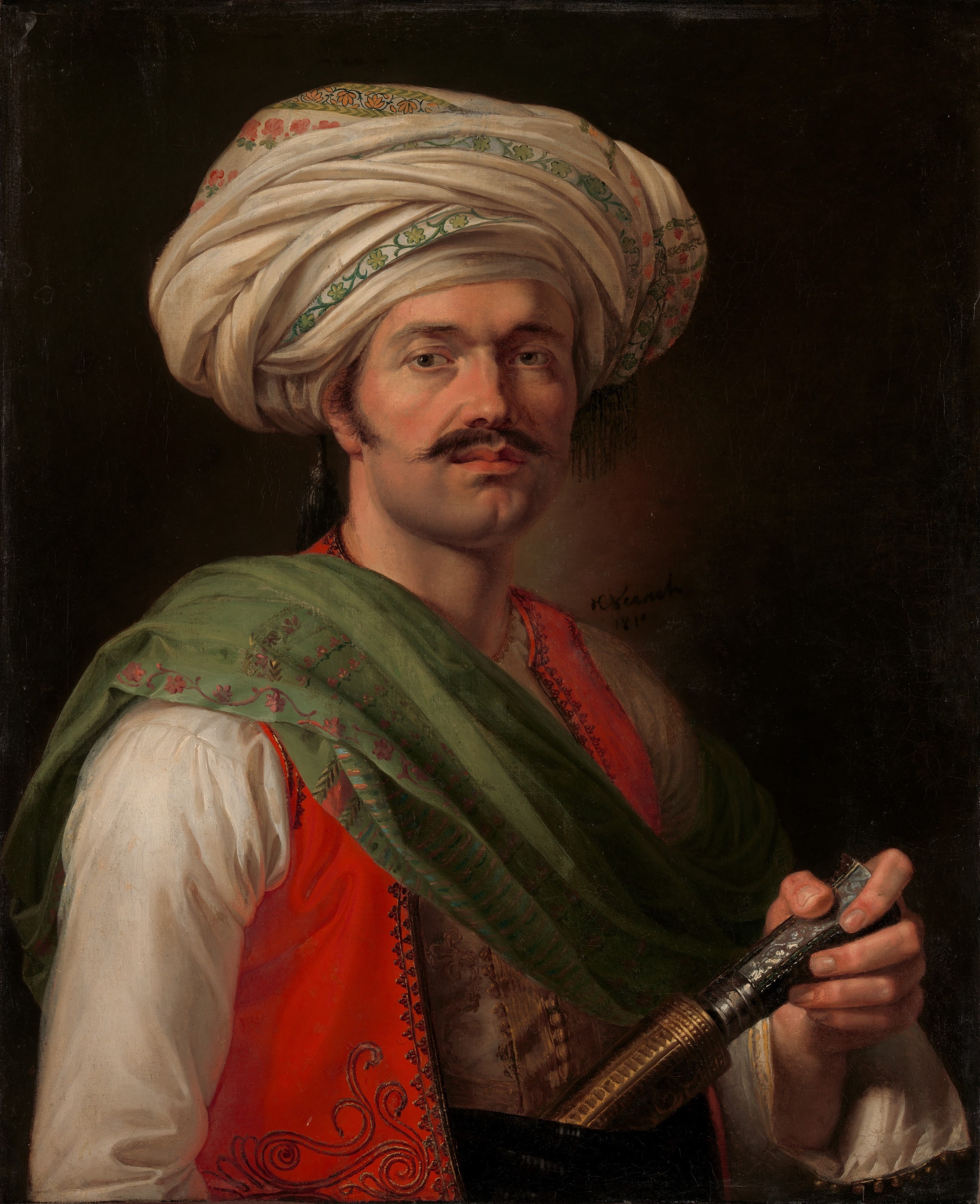
Roustam Raza

- Roustam Raza (1783–1845), Napoleon's Armenian bodyguard.

== S ==
- Sabuktigin (c. 942–997), full name Abu Mansur Sabuktigin, captured and sold into slavery at a young age, rose to become a general and eventually a king and the founder of the Ghaznavid Empire in medieval Iran.
- Safiye Sultan (c. 1550 – c. 1619), an enslaved Albanian woman who was placed in the harem of the Ottoman sultan Murad III and became the mother of sultan Mehmed III.
- Salem Poor (1747–1802), an enslaved African-American man who purchased his freedom, and a war hero during the American Revolutionary War.
- Sally Hemings (1773–1835), a mixed-race woman enslaved by Thomas Jefferson believed by many to have had six children with him, four of whom survived to adulthood.
- Sally Miller or Salomé Müller (born c. 1814), an enslaved American woman whose freedom suit in Louisiana was based on her claimed status as a free German immigrant and indentured servant.
- Sally Seymour (died 1824), American pastry chef and restaurateur, an enslaved woman who was manumitted and became a slave owner herself.
- Salonia the second wife of Cato the Elder
- Salvius, also known as Tryphon, leader of the 104 BCE slave rebellion in Sicily known as the Second Servile War.
- Sambo (died 1736), an enslaved boy who arrived at Sunderland Point, near Lancaster, England, around 1736 from the West Indies in the capacity of a servant a ship's captain. He is buried in an unconsecrated grave in a field near the small village of Sunderland Point, Lancashire, England.
- Sambo, a black captive of Tiger King, a Lower Creek, who told the traveler William Bartram that Sambo was his family property.
- Samson Rowlie (died after 1588), also known as Hassan Aga, Chief Eunuch and Treasurer of Algiers.
- Samuel Benedict (1792–1854), born an African-American slave, later became free and emigrated to Liberia, where he became a politician and judge.
- Samuel Green (c. 1802–1877), an enslaved man who bought his freedom and freedom for his loved ones, was involved with the Underground Railroad, and was jailed in 1857 for carrying a copy of Uncle Tom's Cabin.
- Samuel Ringgold Ward (1817–c. 1866), African-American abolitionist and journalist.
- Sandy Jenkins, an enslaved person mentioned by Frederick Douglass in his first autobiography.
- Sanker, the enslaved manservant of Samuel R. Watkins, author of "Co. Aytch" (1882), which recounts Watkins’ life as a soldier in the 1st Tennessee Infantry Regiment.
- Sarah Forbes Bonetta (1843–1880), an Egbado princess of the Yoruba who was orphaned in intertribal warfare, sold into slavery as a child, was rescued by Captain Frederick E. Forbes of the Royal Navy and taken to the United Kingdom where she became a goddaughter to Queen Victoria.
- Sarah Basset (died 1730), enslaved in Bermuda; executed for the poisoning of three individuals.
- Sarah Johnson (1844–1920) whose life at the first president's plantation was published in the book Sarah Johnson's Mount Vernon.
- Satrelanus, from Gaul, sold by Ermedruda to Toto in Milan in 725.
- Scipio Africanus (c. 1702–1720).
- Scipio Moorhead (fl. 1773–1775), enslaved African-American artist.
- Scipio Vaughan (c. 1784–c. 1840), was captured from his homeland in Africa at a young age and sold into slavery in the United States. He became a skilled artisan in Camden, South Carolina; gained his freedom and inspired a movement among some of his descendants.
- Septimus Clarke (1787–1859), formerly enslaved, he became a successful farmer and community leader in Nova Scotia.
- Servius Tullius, ancient King of Rome said to have started life enslaved (though this was disputed, both among Romans and modern historians).
- Seymour Burr (1754/1762–1837), fought for the Continental Army in the American Revolution.
- Shadrach Minkins (1814–1875), a fugitive from slavery saved by abolitionists at Boston in 1850.
- Shaghab (died 933), mother and co-ruler of the eighteenth Abbasid Caliph al-Muqtadir.

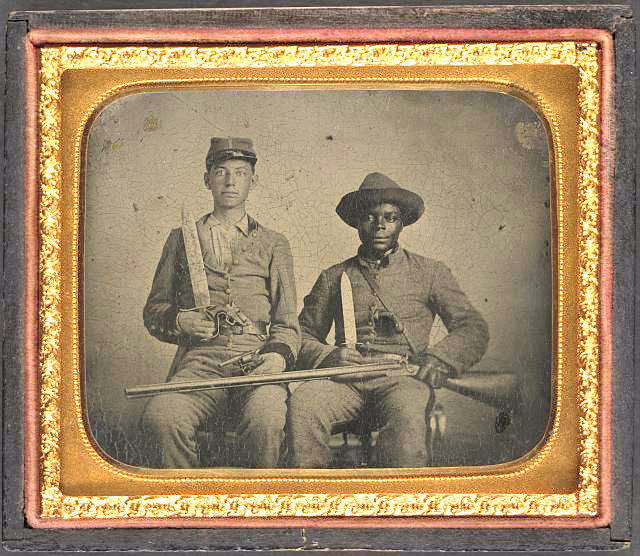
Silas Chandler (right) and his owner, Sergeant A.M. Chandler (left)

- Silas Chandler (1838–1919), man who accompanied his enslavers in the Confederate Army during the American Civil War.
- Sojourner Truth (c. 1797–1883), an abolitionist and women's rights activist.
- Solitude (1772–1802), known as La Mulâtresse, a slave on the island of Guadeloupe freed in 1794 by the abolition of slavery during the French Revolution. She was executed after having fought for freedom when slavery was reintroduced by Napoleon in 1802.
- Solomon Bayley (1771–1839), wrote a book in 1825 about his life as a slave.

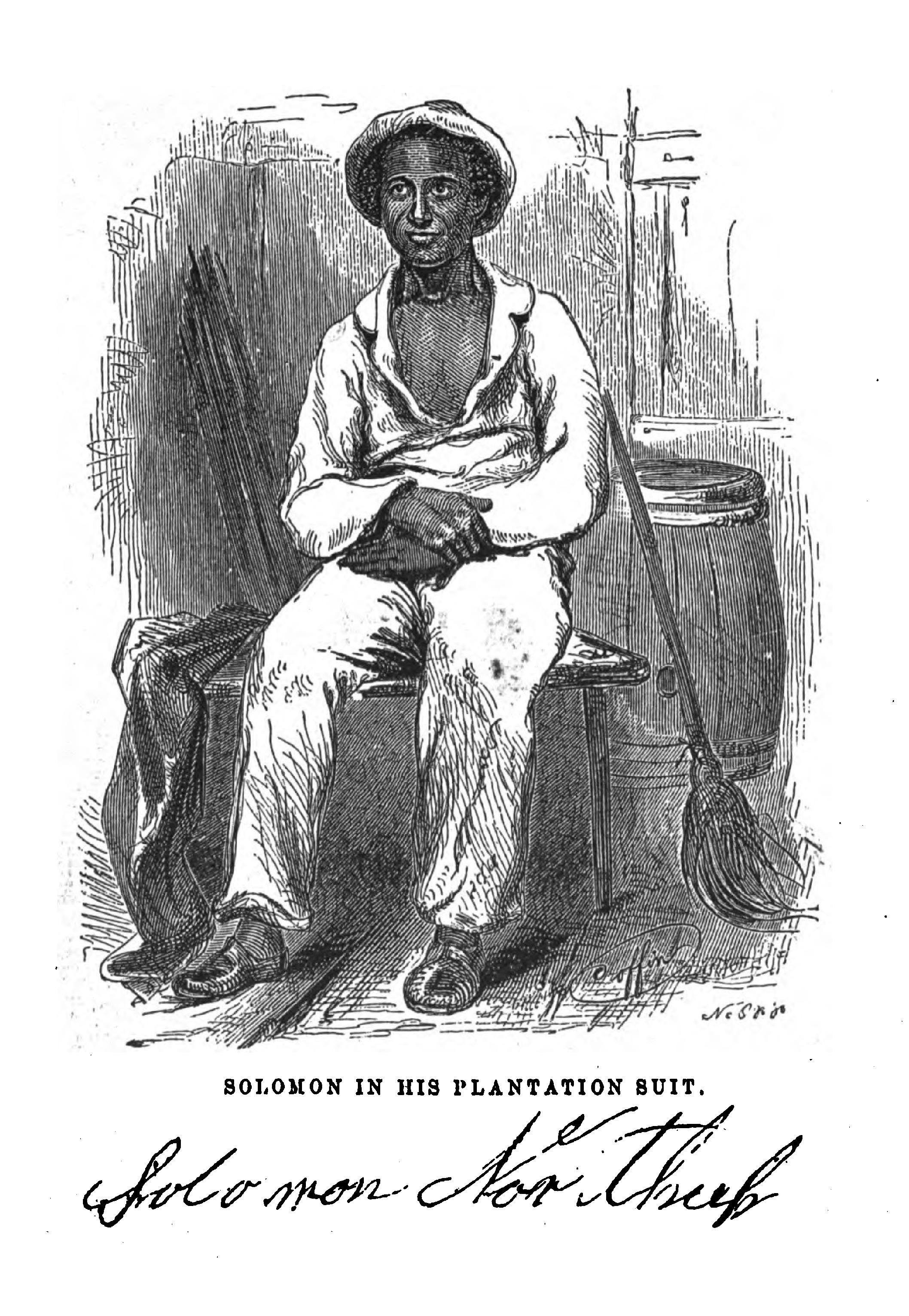
Solomon Northup

- Solomon Northup (1807–c. 1863), a farmer, professional violinist, and free-born black man from New York who was lured to Washington, D.C., where slavery was legal, kidnapped, and sold in the South. He remained enslaved in Louisiana from 1841 until he was rescued and liberated in 1853. Author of Twelve Years a Slave.
- Solomon Flores, enslaved man from northern Alabama.
- Sosias the Thracian, an enslaved Athenian man, and later freedman, enslaved by Nicias, who later leased him a thousand slaves for his mining operation.

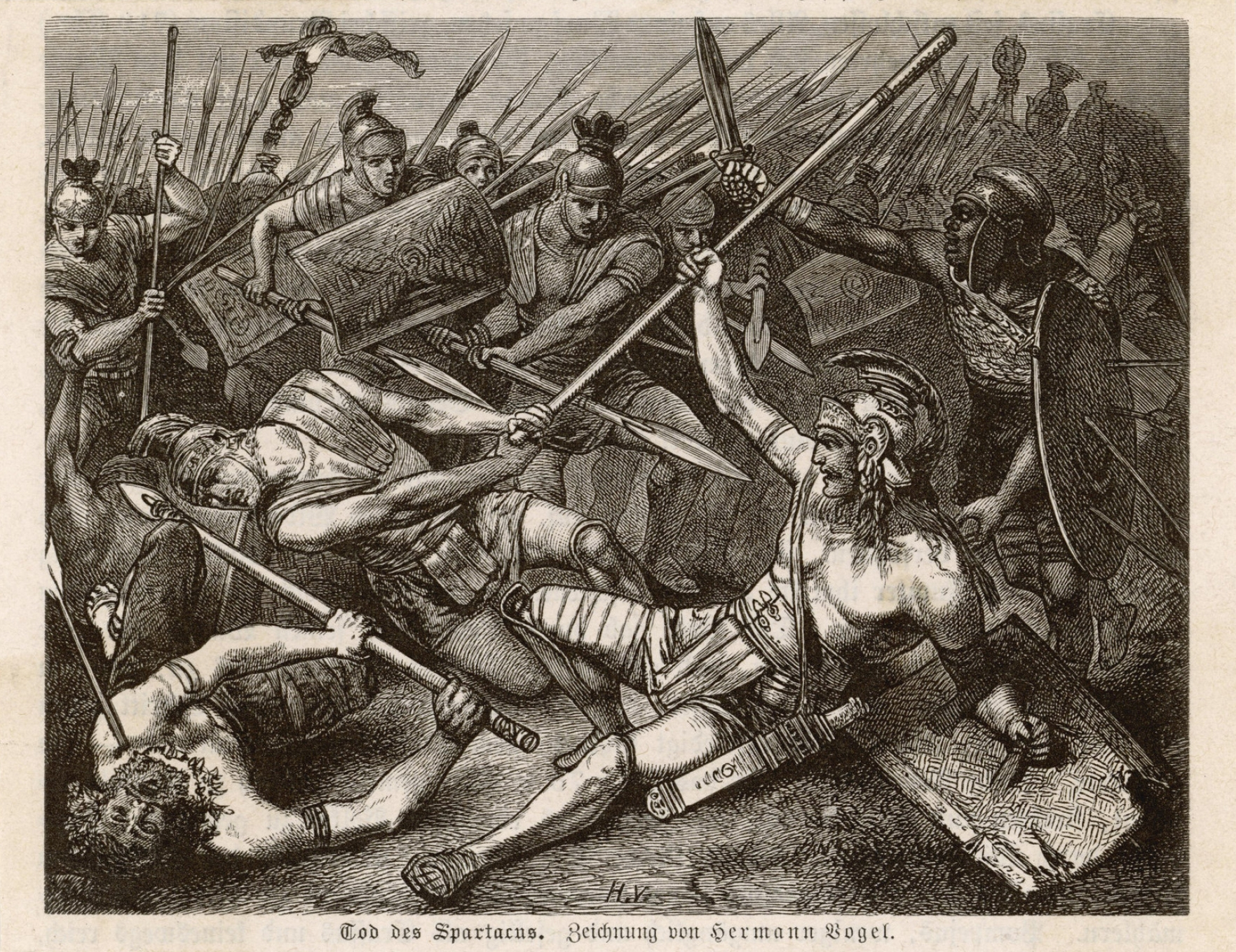
The Death of Spartacus by Hermann Vogel (1882)

- Spartacus (c. 111–71 BCE), a gladiator and rebel leader during the Servile Revolt.
- Spendius, a Campanian who escaped slavery and served as a Carthaginian mercenary during the First Punic War and then as a general in the Mercenary War against Carthage.
- Stefan Holnicki (died after 1797), Polish serf and Royal Ballet Dancer, donated to the king of Poland by will and testament.
- Stephen Bishop (c. 1821–1857), an enslaved mixed-race man in Kentucky known for being one of the first explorers and guides of Mammoth Cave.
- Sue, a black woman enslaved by James Brown, who was captured along with several members of the Brown family and other slaves by Chickamaugas. When the warrior who had captured her threatened another captive, the other captor threatened to kill Sue in retribution. James' son Joseph later kidnapped Sue and her children and grandchildren—eight in all—in retribution for his captivity.
- Suhayb ar-Rumi (born c. 587), also known as Suhayb ibn Sinan, enslaved in childhood in the Byzantine Empire, escaped as a young man to Mecca and went on to become an esteemed companion of Muhammad and revered member of the early Muslim community.
- Sumayyah bint Khayyat (550–615), a woman enslaved in Mecca and one of the first seven converts to Islam made by Muhammad in his early career. She was tortured and killed by enemies of the new faith, becoming the first Muslim Shahid.
- Squanto (1585–1622), also known as Tisquantum, a Native American of what is now coastal Massachusetts who was captured by English pirates and sold as a slave. He was later freed and returned to New England, where he met the Pilgrims of the Mayflower in 1621.
- Subh of Cordoba (940–999), an enslaved concubine of a Caliph and mother and regent of the next Caliph of Cordoba in the 10th century.
- Suk-bin Choe (1670–1718), consort of Sukjong of Joseon and mother of Yeongjo of Joseon.
- Surya Devi (died 715), Indian princess, enslaved by Caliph Sulayman ibn Abd al-Malik.

== T ==
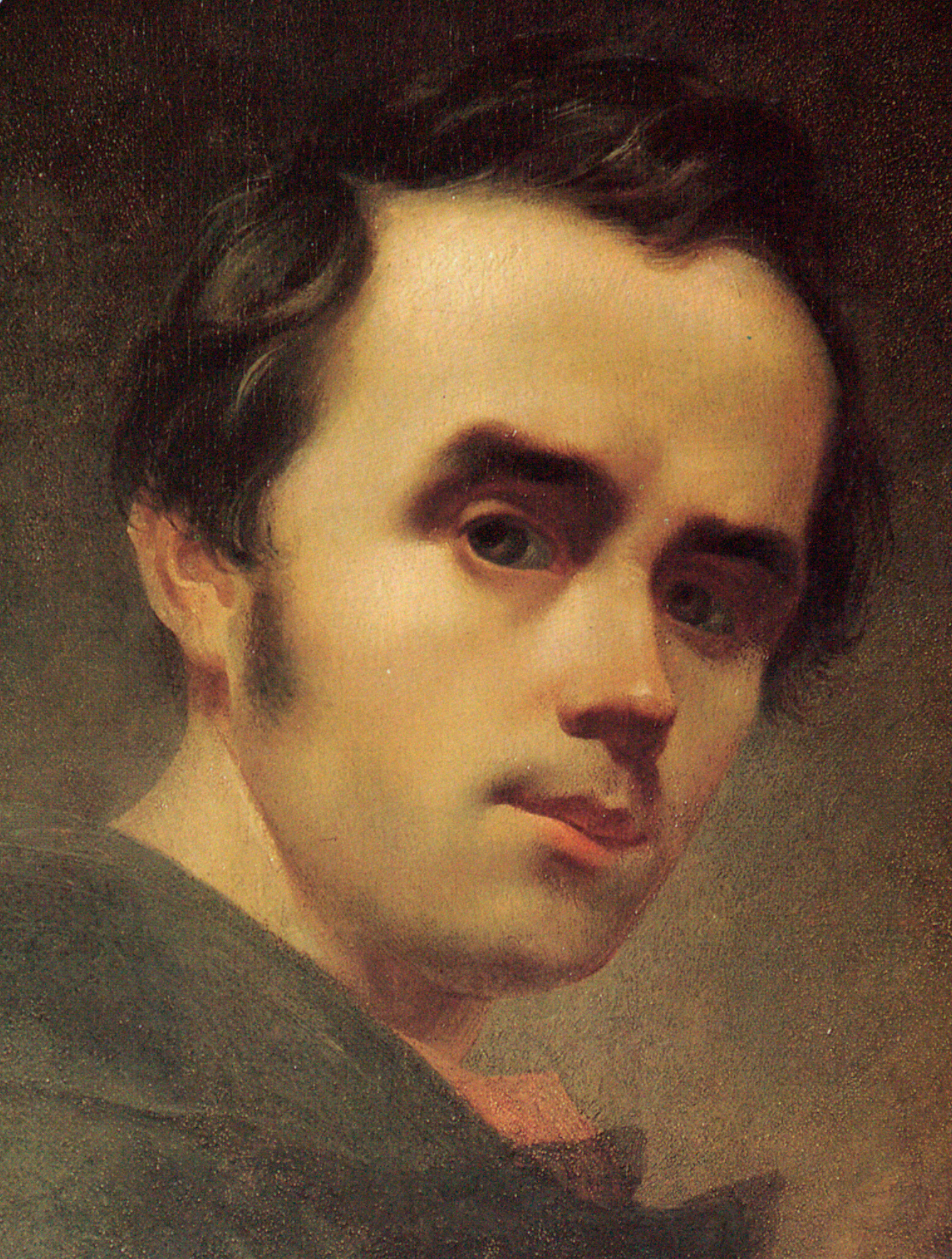
Taras Shevchenko

- Taras Shevchenko (1814–1861) Ukrainian poet, artist and illustrator born in a family of serfs. His artist friends bought his freedom in 1838.

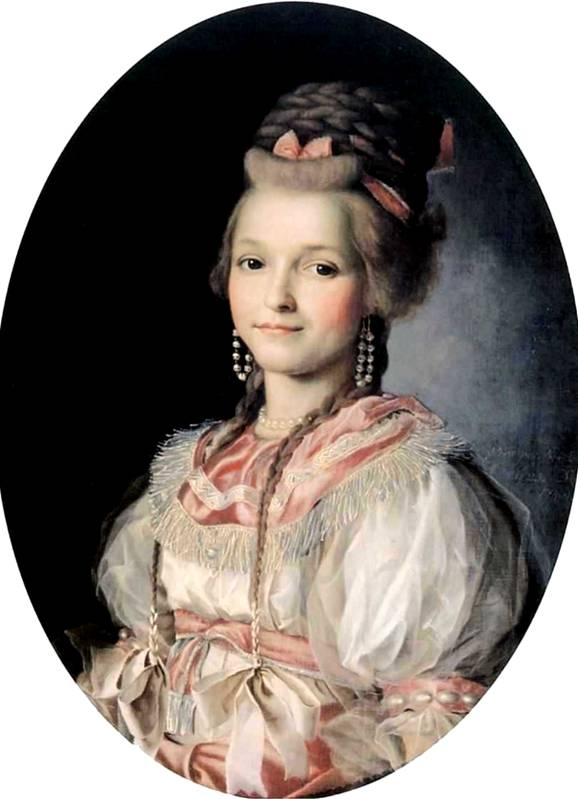
Tatyana Shlykova

- Tatyana Shlykova (1773–1863), Russian serf ballerina and opera singer.
- Thanadelthur (c. 1697–1717), a woman of the Chipewyan Dënesųłı̨ne nation who served as a guide and interpreter for the Hudson's Bay Company.
- Thomas Fuller, African American man enslaved in Virginia, renowned for his mathematical abilities.
- Thomas Pellow (1704–1745), enslaved by Barbary pirates, taken to Morocco the selected and tortured by Ismail Ibn Sharif. Escaped after 23 years and returned home to Cornwall.
- Thomas Peters (1738–1792), born Thomas Potters, one of the founding fathers of Sierra Leone. Formerly enslaved, he fled North Carolina during the American Revolutionary War. Peters was a Black Loyalist member of the British Black Company of Pioneers, became a sergeant, and settled and married in Nova Scotia. He recruited African settlers in Nova Scotia for the colonization of Sierra Leone and later became a leader in Freetown.
- Thomas Sims (born 1834), an enslaved African American man who escaped slavery in Georgia to Boston, Massachusetts, only to be recaptured under the Fugitive Slave Act of 1850 and to escape to Boston once more.
- Thomas-Alexandre Dumas (1762–1806), a French general and father of Alexandre Dumas.
- Thumal (c.890s/900s–c.929), administrator of justice to Abbasid Caliph al-Muqtadir.
- T. Aelius Dionysius, a freedman of the late Roman Empire, who created a stela for himself, his wife, and Aelius Perseus, his fellow freedman, and their freedman and those who came after them.
- T. Claudius Dionysius, a freedman whose freedwoman wife Claudia Prepontis erected a funerary altar to him. Their clasped hands, depicted on it, show the legitimacy of their marriage, possible only once they obtained their freedom.

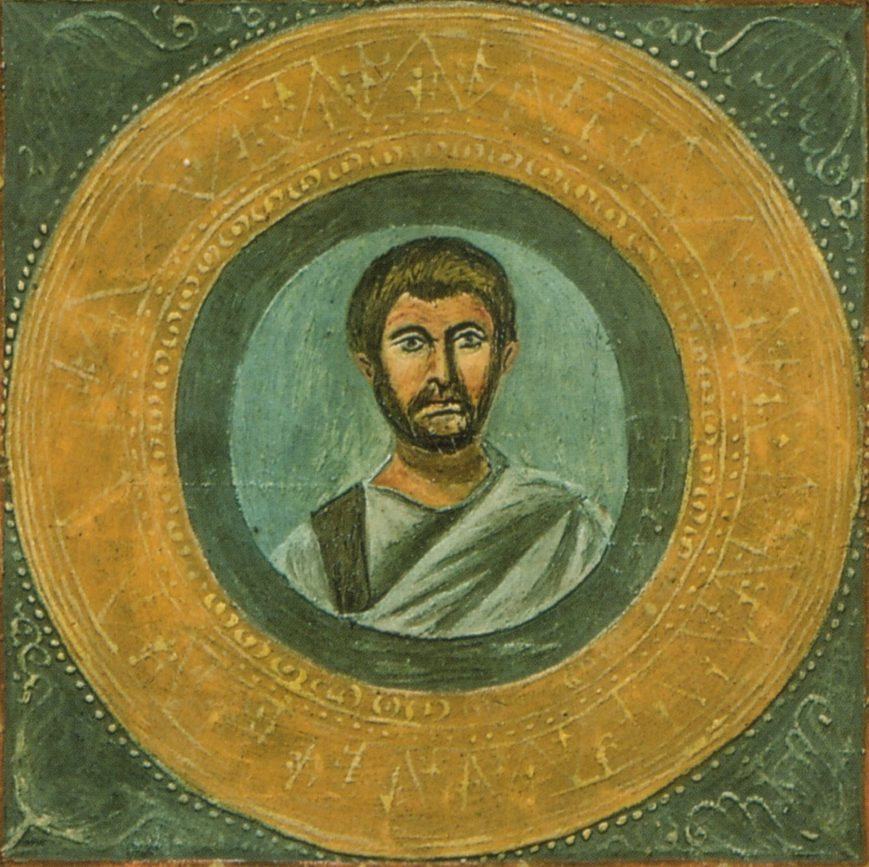
Terence

- Terence (c. 195/185–c. 159 BCE), full name Publius Terentius Afer, Roman playwright and comic poet who wrote before and possibly after his freedom.
- Tiberius Claudius Narcissus (died c. 54 AD), freedman who was secretary to Roman emperor Claudius.
- Tituba (fl. 1692–1693), a Native American woman who was enslaved by Samuel Parris of Danvers, Massachusetts. She was the first person accused of practicing witchcraft during the Salem witch trials.
- Tomás Ortega, an enslaved man in colonial Mexico who attempted to marry Leonor de Mendoza, a woman enslaved by another master. When that man imprisoned Tomás, Leonor appealed to a church court for assistance, and it threatened excommunication if he did not free Tomás.
- Titus Kent (1733–18??), enslaved by the Samuel Kent family in Suffield, Connecticut. He was owned by Samuel Kent, who lived 1698–1772; Samuel Kent's 1772 probate recorded that Titus was bequeathed Samuel Kent's son, Elihu Kent. American Revolutionary War records indicate that Titus served in different regiments from 1775 to 1783.
- Toussaint L'Ouverture (1743–1803), a freedman who led the slave revolt that led to the independence of Haiti.
- Tula (died 1795), a leader of the Curaçao Slave Revolt of 1795.
- Turgut Reis (1485–1565), also known as Dragut, a well-known admiral of the Ottoman Navy of the 16th century who was captured by the Genoese at Corsica and forced to work as a galley slave for nearly four years. He was finally rescued by his fellow admiral Barbarossa, who laid siege to Genoa and secured Turgut Reis' release for the prodigious ransom of 3,500 gold ducats. Thereupon, Turgut Reis resumed his naval career (which included the enslavement of various other people).
- Turhan Sultan (c. 1627–1683) was Haseki Sultan of the Ottoman sultan Ibrahim (reign 1640–1648) and Valide sultan as the mother of Mehmed IV (reign 1648–1687).

== U ==
- Ukawsaw Gronniosaw (1705–1775), also known as James Albert, a freedman turned writer whose autobiography is considered the first published by an African in Britain.
- Ursula Granger (1738–1800), a woman enslaved by Thomas Jefferson who worked as a cook, dairymaid, laundress, and wet nurse, and has been referred to as the "Queen of Monticello"

== V ==
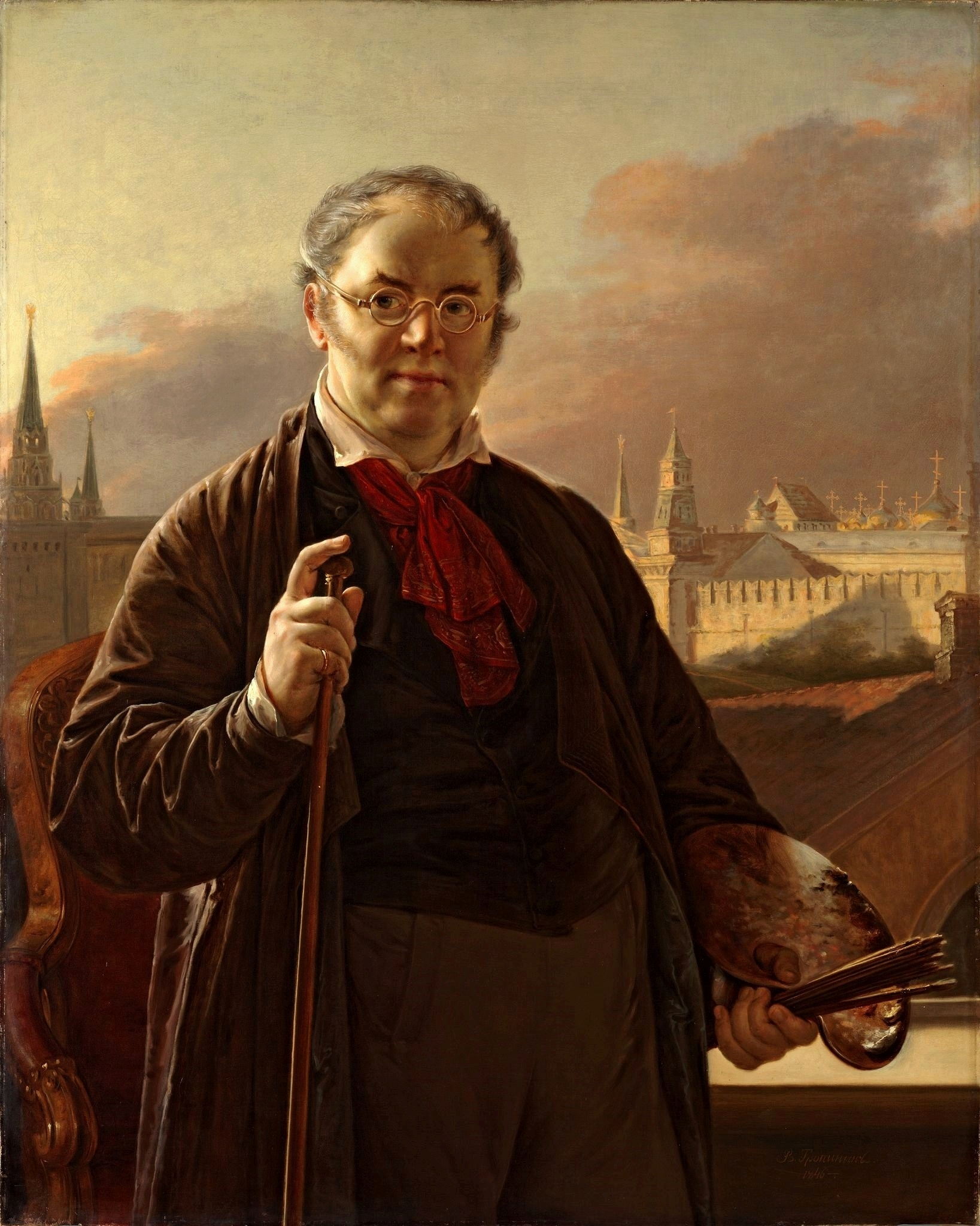
Vasily Tropinin

- Vasily Tropinin (1776–1857), Russian serf painter.
- Venture Smith (1729–1805), an African captured as a child and transported to the American colonies as a slave. When an adult, he purchased his freedom and that of his family – his wife Meg and their children Hannah, Solomon and Cuff. His history was documented and published by a schoolteacher, to whom he talked in his old age.
- Venus Vance (died c. 1850), an enslaved American woman who lived and worked on the plantation of Mira Margaret Baird Vance.
- The Vestmenn ("West Men" in Old Norse, referring to the Irish) were a group of Irish slaves brought to Iceland by Hjörleifr Hróðmarsson, one of the early Norse settlers there. He treated them badly, and they killed him and escaped to a group of offshore islands. Ingólfur Arnarson, Hjörleifur's blood brother, tracked the escaped slaves and killed them all. Though their individual names are unknown, their memory lives on in Icelandic geography, the islands where they sought refuge being known up to the present as "Vestmannaeyjar": "Islands of the West Men" (i.e. of the Irish).

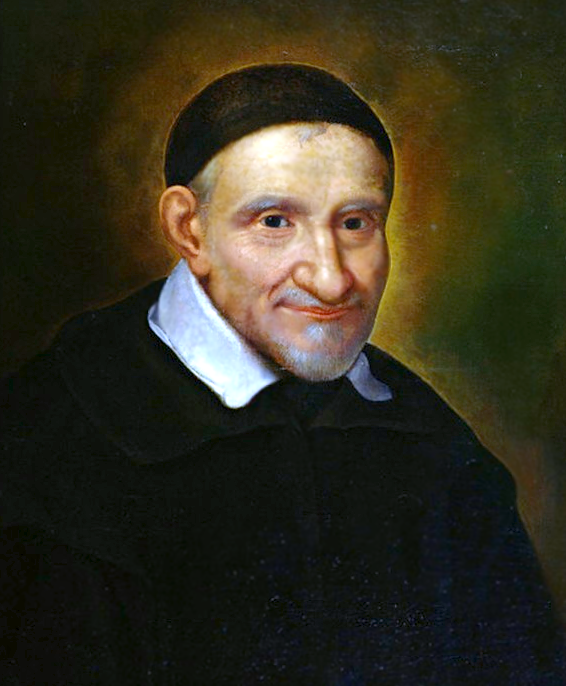
Vincent de Paul

- Vincent de Paul (1581–1660), a French priest who is venerated as a saint in the Catholic Church. He was taken captive by Turkish pirates, sold into slavery, and freed in 1607.
- Vindicius, an ancient Roman slave who discovered Tarquin's plot to regain power.
- Vibia Calybeni, a freedwoman of the late Roman Empire who unusually named herself as a madam on her tombstone.
- Virginia Boyd, an enslaved American woman whose letter to R.C. Ballard, pleading not to be sold with her children among strangers, has been preserved. Ballard had undertaken to have her sold at the request of Judge Samuel Boyd, the children's father, to hide her existence from his family.
- Violet Ludlow, an American woman sold into slavery several times despite her claims to be a free white woman.
- Virginia Demetricia (1842–after 1867), an enslaved Aruban known as a heroine of resistance against enslavement.
- Vitalis, ancient enslaved Roman. An epigraph describes an enslaved boy, Iucundus, as the son of Gryphus and Vitalis.
- Volumnia Cytheris, an enslaved and later freedwoman in ancient Rome. An actress and courtesan, her lovers included Brutus, Mark Antony, and Cornelius Gallus; her rejection of Gallus provided the theme for Virgil's tenth Eclogue.

== W ==
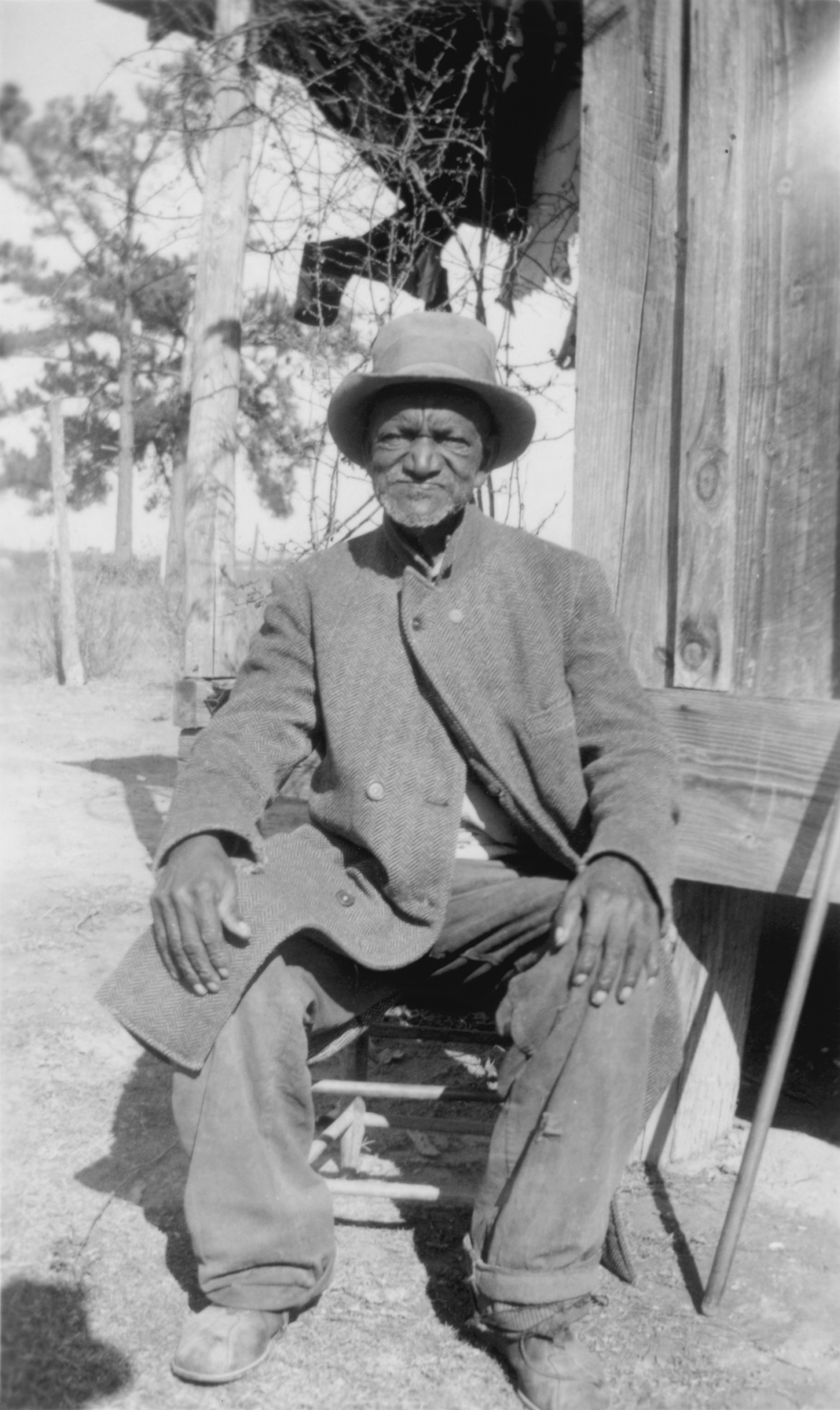
Wes Brady

- Wes Brady (born 1849), of Marshall, Texas, was included in the Federal Writers' Project Slave Narrative Collection.
- West Ford (c. 1784–1863), enslaved by George Washington and served as caretaker at Mount Vernon. Claimed to be Washington's biological son.
- William Ansah Sessarakoo (c. 1736–1770), African prince who became a victim of the transatlantic slave trade, was freed, and then became a slave trader himself.
- William Beverly Nash (1822–1888), a North Carolina state senator.
- William Ellison (1790–1861), an enslaved man of mixed race who, after gaining his freedom, became a slaveholder himself, producing cotton.
- William Gardner (born 1759), a man enslaved by James Madison who Madison sold into indentured servitude for seven years before becoming emancipated and working as a merchant's agent.
- William (1824–1900) and Ellen Craft (1826–1891), a married enslaved couple from Macon, Georgia, whose daring escape to the North in 1848 made them among the most famous fugitives from slavery in the country.
- William Harvey Carney (1840–1908), a soldier during the American Civil War who received the Medal of Honor after his escape from slavery.
- William Henry, nicknamed "Jerry", a man who escaped slavery in Missouri but was arrested in Syracuse, New York in 1851 before being rescued by abolitionists from being extradited under the Fugitive Slave Law.
- William A. Jackson, man enslaved by Jefferson Davis who fled in 1861 with considerable detailed military intelligence about Confederate forces.
- William Andrew Johnson, mixed-race American man enslaved by President Andrew Johnson, son of Dolly Johnson.
- William D. Gibbons (1825–1886), enslaved domestic servant; became African Baptist minister after emancipation.
- William Dorsey Swann (1860–1925), born into slavery in Maryland, later became an LGBT activist and the first known person to self-identify as a drag queen.
- William Jones was an enslaved man who was acquired by Ulysses S. Grant from his father-in-law in 1858. Jones was thirty-five years old at the time. Although Grant was not an abolitionist, he was not considered a "slavery man", and could not bring himself to force a slave to do work. In March 1859, Grant freed William by a manumission deed, potentially worth at least $1,000, when Grant needed the money. The case of William Jones received much attention from historians, and is used in debates on Grant's attitude to slavery.
- William Lee (1750–1828), a man enslaved by George Washington who served as his personal servant with him during the American Revolutionary War and was the only person freed from slavery by Washington's will.
- William Okeley Englishman enslaved by Algerian pirates.
- William Wells Brown (c. 1814–1884), African-American writer, escaped from slavery 1834.
- Wilson Chinn African American featuring in an 1863 photograph as "branded slave"
- Wulfstan, a man enslaved in Anglo-Saxon England, and his two sons and stepdaughter. They were freed by his mistress Æthelgifu's will.
- Wu Rui (15th century), enslaved eunuch in what is now Vietnam. He was the youngest of thirteen Chinese men from Wenchang whose ship was blown off course and who were subsequently enslaved by the Lê dynasty. As recorded in the Ming Shi-lu, his companions were made agricultural laborers while Wu Rui was castrated and became an attendant at the Imperial Citadel of Thang Long. After years of service, he was promoted at the death of the Vietnamese ruler in 1497 to a military position in northern Vietnam. A soldier told him of an escape route back to China and Wu Rui escaped to Longzhou. The local chief planned to sell him back to the Vietnamese, but Wu was rescued by the Pingxiang magistrate and then was sent to Beijing to work as a eunuch in the palace.
- Wyatt Lee (c. 1822–1863), the first husband of Dr. Rebecca Davis Lee Crumpler. He escaped slavery in Virginia.

== X ==
- Xenon, an enslaved Athenian man and banker.
- Xing was the primary primary spouse of Gaozong, the brother of Qinzong, Chinese Emperor of the Song Dynasty. In 1127, the capital of Kaifeng was captured by the Jurchen during the Jin–Song Wars, and Xing was among more than 3000 people captured and exiled to Manchuria in what was called the Jingkang Incident. Xing was among The Imperial consorts, concubines, palace women and eunuchs who were captured, and distributed among the Jurchen as slaves. Xing's husband Gaozong, who avoided capture, became the new Emperor and declared Xing Empress in absentia, but was unable to get her free. She remained in captivity where she was coveted by her captors, attempted suicide to escape abuse but failed, and she died in captivity in 1139.

== Y ==
- Yaqut al-Hamawi (1179–1229), an Arab biographer and geographer known for his encyclopedic writings on the Muslim world. He was sold into slavery in 12th-century Syria and taken to Baghdad, but was provided with a good education and later freed.
- Yasār (7th century), a Christian man who had been captured in a campaign of Khalid ibn al-Walid, a companion of Muhammad. Yasār was taken to Medina and became the slave of Qays ibn Makhrama ibn al-Muṭṭalib ibn ʿAbd Manāf ibn Quṣayy. He accepted Islam, was manumitted and became his mawlā, thus acquiring the nisbat al-Muṭṭalibī. He had three sons – Mūsā, ʿAbd al-Raḥmān, and Isḥāq. His grandson, Ibn Ishaq, became an important early Arab historian.
- Yasuke, a 16th-century African man who traveled to Japan in the service of Jesuit missionary Alessandro Valignano. Given to Oda Nobunaga, Yasuke became a confident of the daimyō and given official status as a trusted retainer.
- York (1770–before 1832), an African-American man enslaved by William Clark, who was part of the Lewis and Clark Expedition.

== Z ==
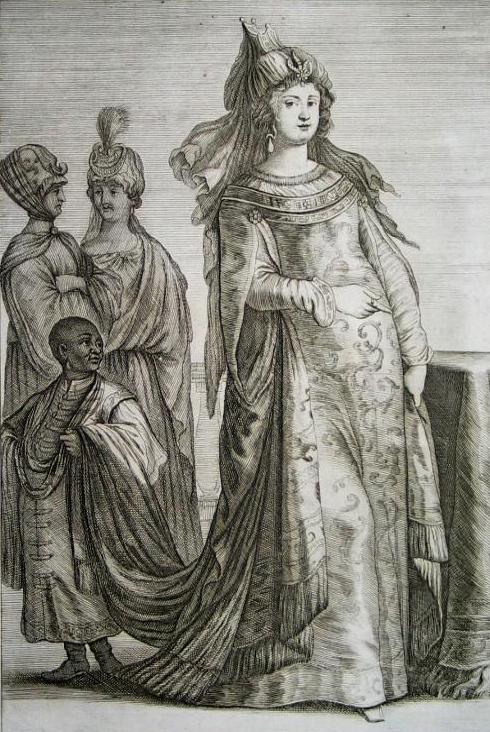
Zafire Hatun

- Zafire Hatun (c. 1620s–1645/1646), slave of probable Georgian or Russian origin in the Ottoman Imperial Harem. After being captured in a naval battle in 1644, she was briefly a slave of the Knights Hospitaller on Malta, until her possible identity as the favourite of sultan Ibrahim and the mother of his son was revealed and she was released by Giovanni Paolo Lascaris.
- Zalmoxis, a Dacian who was enslaved by Pythagoras on the island of Samos, according to Herodotus. Zalmoxis learned philosophy from his owner and other wise Greeks. Eventually he was liberated, gathered huge wealth and went back to his homeland, where he converted the Thracians to his beliefs, was greatly venerated for his wisdom and in later generations became worshiped as a god.
- Zayd ibn Haritha (c. 581–629), given to Muhammad's wife Khadijah, freed, adopted, and became known as Zayd ibn Muhammad.
- Ziryab (789–857), also known as Abul-Hasan Alí Ibn Nafí, a Muslim singer, musician, and polymath known for introducing the crop asparagus to Europe.
- Zoe (died 127), slave in Pamphylia, Roman Anatolia and a Christian martyr. She and her family were killed for refusing to participate in pagan rites when their son was born.

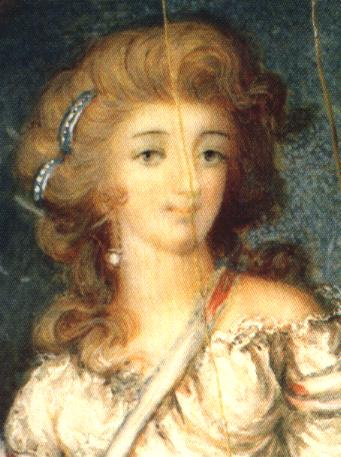
Zofia Potocka

- Zofia Potocka (1760–1822), a Greek-Ottoman enslaved courtesan who ended up as a Polish countess by marriage.
- Zumbi (c. 1655–1695), enslaved in Portuguese Brazil, he escaped and joined the Quilombo dos Palmares, the largest ever settlement of escaped slaves in colonial Brazil, becoming its last and most famous leader.
- Zunairah al-Rumiya (7th century), slave of apparent Roman origin in Arabia and a companion of Muhammad.

== See also ==
- List of last survivors of American slavery
- List of enslaved people of Mount Vernon, George Washington's plantation
- List of slave owners
- Timeline of abolition of slavery and serfdom
- 1926 Slavery Convention, an international treaty
- 1956 Supplementary Convention on the Abolition of Slavery
- Comfort women, sex slaves in WWII
- History of slavery
- Human trafficking
- Involuntary servitude
- International Slavery Museum
- U.S. National Museum of African American History and Culture
- Slave Trade Acts
- Slavery in the United States
