= Mustafa, Pasha of Rhodes =

18th-century Ottoman official

Mustafa (c. 1708 – c. 1751/1763) was an Ottoman official who was Pasha of Rhodes in the 1740s. In January 1748, he was captured during a slave revolt on board his galley Lupa, and he was subsequently enslaved in Hospitaller Malta until May 1749. While on the island, Mustafa orchestrated a plot in which Muslim slaves were to rise up, assassinate Grand Master Manuel Pinto da Fonseca and take over the island with the assistance of the Ottoman Empire and the Barbary states.

The plot was never put into action as it was discovered prematurely in June 1749, and many plotters were tried, tortured and executed in the following months. Despite being implicated, Mustafa was never put on trial or punished due to French diplomatic intervention. He remained a captive in Malta until March 1751, when he departed the island for Constantinople. Mustafa's later life is unclear, with sources making several contradictory claims regarding his subsequent fate.

== Early life and governorship of Rhodes ==
Mustafa was reportedly born in Chios in around 1708. He was from a distinguished family, and his father Suleiman was a Pasha and Grand Admiral of Constantinople, and had reportedly almost been appointed as Grand Vizier. Mustafa was well-educated and spoke Greek, Arabic and some French and Italian. Mustafa's family owned several slaves, including Cara Mehmed, a black man from Tripoli to whom Suleiman had promised freedom upon the latter's death in 1740. Mustafa did not honour this promise, and continued to consider Cara Mehmed as his slave and reportedly treated him in a brutal manner.

In the early 1740s, Mustafa was appointed as Pasha of the Sanjak of Rhodes, an office which other members of his family had previously held. His appointment was reportedly in recognition of several naval victories. He governed Rhodes and the adjacent islands for five years until his term expired in January 1748.

== Lupa revolt and captivity in Malta ==
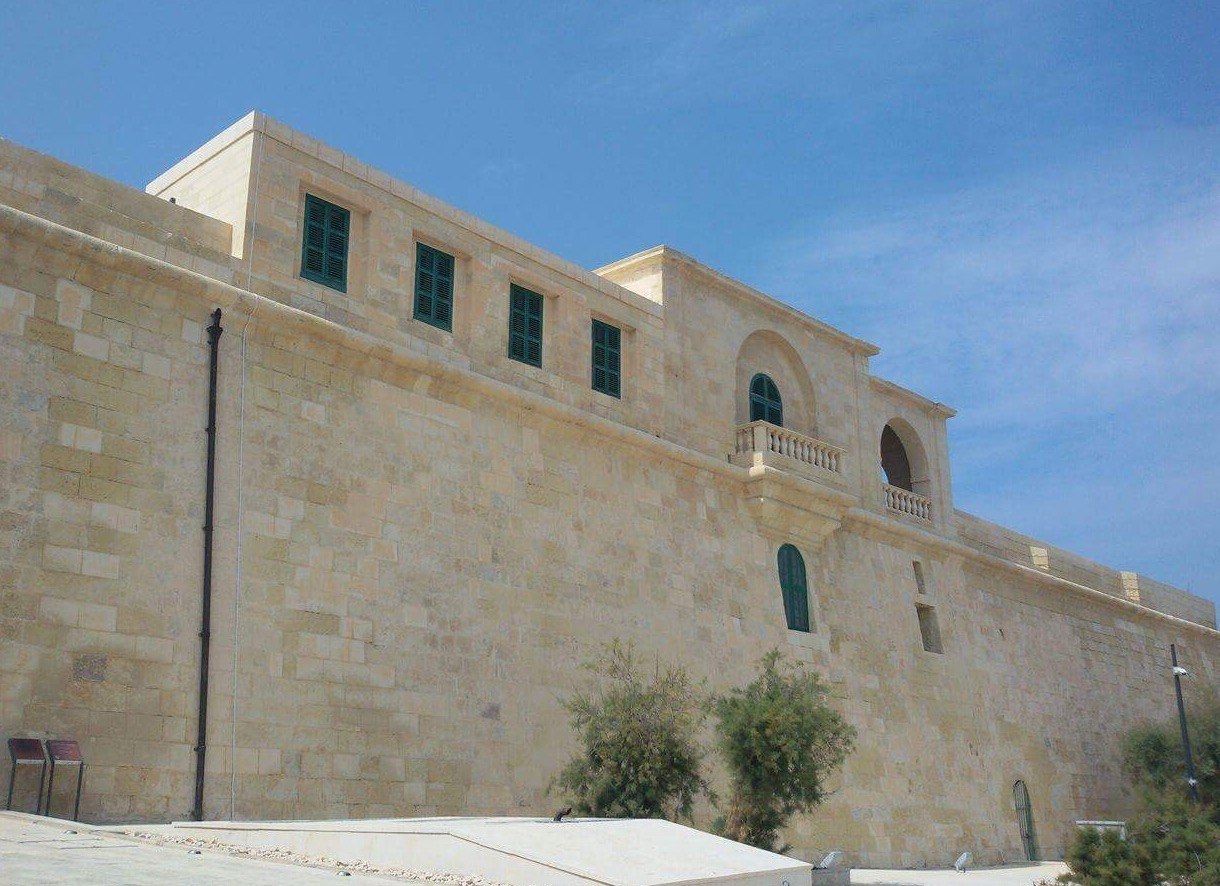
Fort Saint Elmo in Valletta, Malta, where Mustafa was confined from March to July 1748 and again from June 1749

When Mustafa's governorship ended, he boarded his galley Lupa and was en route to Karaman when a group of slaves on board – including Cara Mehmed – revolted, massacred most of the crew, liberated the remaining slaves and imprisoned Mustafa. They then sailed the ship to Hospitaller Malta, where they arrived on 1 February and were quarantined at the Lazzaretto of Manoel Island until 2 March. Mustafa formally became a slave, but acknowledging his high rank, the Hospitallers treated him well and accommodated him in comfortable living quarters at Fort Saint Elmo which normally housed the fort's governor. He was assigned slaves to cook his meals and attend to his needs, and shortly after his arrival he had an audience with Hospitaller Grand Master Manuel Pinto da Fonseca.

In May 1748, Mustafa toured the Grand Harbour and examined the Hospitaller galleys, while in July there was an incident in which he beat two Georgian slaves who had been assigned to him after he caught them peeping on women; the Hospitallers subsequently punished the two slaves on Mustafa's behalf. Later that month, Mustafa was moved to Casino Napoletane, a house with a garden in Floriana which had previously been the residence of Grand Master Ramón Despuig. While in Floriana, Mustafa was able to freely meet other Muslims including the leaders of the slave community on Malta. He also met a representative of the Ottoman sultan who was en route to the Barbary regencies, and he frequently met the Balì de Bocage, a Hospitaller knight and French diplomat who was attempting to secure his release as a result of the Franco-Ottoman alliance.

In the meantime, Mustafa began plotting to instigate a revolt among Muslim slaves in an attempt to take over the island from the Hospitallers. He did so through the use of other people as intermediaries, and he made efforts to ensure that he would not be blamed personally if the plot was discovered prematurely. The plot is believed to have been Mustafa's attempt to redeem his honour and regain favour with the sultan, Mahmud I, in order to avenge the humiliation of his being captured by his own slaves. Several of the former slaves who had been freed during Lupa revolt participated in the plot, including Cara Mehmed, although the latter appears to have been unaware that Mustafa was its mastermind.

The plot was to have taken place on 29 June 1749, a Christian feast day. Three days before, Mustafa planned to ask Pinto to allow him to move back to Fort St. Elmo, and the revolt was to begin with Pinto's assassination and uprisings in the Grand Master's Palace and Forni della Signoria. These were to be followed by the takeover of Gran Prigione and Fort St. Elmo. Mustafa would then be able to take charge, and further uprisings in Birgu and Senglea and naval assistance from the Ottomans and the Barbary states were to follow after signals from St. Elmo. Mustafa had also distributed arsenic to galley slaves on board the Hospitaller fleet which was out at sea in order for them to rise up and return to Malta to support the rebellion.

Following French intervention, Mustafa was formally released from slavery on 5 May 1749. Upon reattaining his freedom, Mustafa refused to leave the island, claiming that he wanted to be escorted to Constantinople on a French ship. Details of the plot were leaked to the Hospitallers on 6 June, and over the next few weeks many conspirators were detained and interrogated using torture. By 14 June, there was speculation that Mustafa was involved in the plot, but initially no restrictions were placed on his movements. On 19 June, a group of Valletta residents threatened to stone him while he was going around the city with attendants and a carriage, and the next day armed Maltese villagers attempted to march to his Floriana residence but were held back by the Hospitaller authorities. Mustafa was suspected of being the mastermind behind the plot by 21 June, and on the following day a mob of thousands of Maltese gathered outside the Floriana residence and once again threatened to stone or lynch him. Pinto sent reinforcements to guard the Pasha, who was subsequently moved back to the more secure quarters at Fort St. Elmo.

Between July and November 1749, 35 people were executed for their involvement in the plot, two others died during or after torture, one committed suicide, and 72 others were condemned to the galleys. After Mustafa had been implicated, Pinto wanted to punish and make an example of him, but at the same time he was not willing to risk alienating the French government which had secured Mustafa's freedom only weeks before the plot was uncovered. Pinto and Pope Benedict XIV wrote letters to French monarch Louis XV requesting that the latter waive his protection of the Pasha, and the fate of Mustafa was the subject of copious correspondence between the Order and its ambassadors in France and Rome, and the French government and its ambassadors in Malta, Rome and Constantinople. Mustafa also sent a letter to Ottoman grand vizier Seyyid Abdullah Pasha defending his position.

By late 1749, French ambassador to Constantinople Roland Puchot suggested that Mustafa be allowed to escape from Malta, while the French and Ottoman governments were also considering the possibility of setting up an exchange of Muslim slaves in Malta including Mustafa for Christian slaves held by the Ottomans. These negotiations fell through, and Mustafa finally left Malta on board a French ship bound for Constantinople on 13 March 1751.

== Later life ==
Mustafa's later life after returning to the Ottoman Empire is unclear, and several contradictory unverified rumours circulated on Malta in the months after his departure. These include that he had been poisoned shortly after arriving in Constantinople, that he had been appointed to an inferior post as a governor in Tartary thus being banished from the Ottoman court, or that he and his brother had died of bubonic plague.

Some publications in 1752–1753 reported that Mustafa had been involved in the banishment of the Grand Vizier and that he had sought the office for himself with support from the Janissaries. His efforts were said to have been unsuccessful, resulting in his imprisonment in a castle on the Sea of Marmara, with some sources claiming that he ended up being strangled on the sultan's orders and that his body was discarded in the Black Sea.

Other sources from 1761 state that he was still alive at that point and that he had been offered a position within the Ottoman Navy, while another source suggests that he had died by May 1763.

== Bibliography ==
- Cassar, Kenneth; Grillo, Rachel (2024). Betrayal and Vengeance: The Slaves' Conspiracy of 1749 in 19 Historical Drawings. Heritage Malta. ISBN 978-99186-19-9-00.
- Zammit, William (2023). Slavery, Treason and Blood: The 1749 Plot of the Slaves in Malta. Heritage Malta. ISBN 978-99186-19-14-6.
