= Il Moro =

Il Moro is Italian for "The Moor", and may refer to:

- Alessandro de' Medici (1510–1537), Duke of Florence
- Cara Mehmed (c. 1723–1749), Ottoman rebel slave
- Ludovico Sforza (1452–1508), Duke of Milan
- Francesco Torbido (1486–1562), Venetian Renaissance painter
