= Lupa (ship) =

The Lupa was an Ottoman galley on which a slave rebellion took place in January 1748. The vessel was the flagship of Mustafa, Pasha of Rhodes, and the revolt broke out upon the end of his governorship of Rhodes, while he was en route to Karaman.

The revolt occurred when 16 galley slaves rose up and commandeered the ship. Three of the rebels – Antonio Montalto, Claudio Camilleri and Pietro Schembri – were Maltese, eleven others were non-Maltese Christians (including Hungarians and Georgians), and two were Muslims from North Africa and the Black Sea region. The planners of the revolt included Montalto and Cara Mehmed; the latter was a Muslim who had been granted his freedom by Mustafa's father but had continued to be treated as a slave by Mustafa. The rebel slaves took more than 150 Ottoman personnel and passengers captive, then massacred the ship's Turkish sailors and threw their bodies in the sea. According to Giovanni Pietro Francesco Agius de Soldanis, 161 slaves on board the galley were liberated as a result of the revolt, including 18 who were Maltese.

Some sources state that the rebel slaves were led by Cara Mehmed, while others mention that they elected Demetrius, an Albanian, as their leader. They sailed the ship to Hospitaller Malta, and by the time of their arrival, there were 22 Ottoman captives on board, including Mustafa. The Lupa was spotted off the island on 1 February, and a galley of the Hospitaller fleet, the San Luigi, was sent to investigate. When the Hospitallers learnt of the rebellion, they provided the former slaves with supplies and towed the galley to Malta's Marsamxett Harbour. The ship and its passengers were quarantined at the Lazzaretto of Manoel Island until 2 March.

Later that month, the galley was moved from Marsamxett to the Grand Harbour, where it was examined by shipwrights. Inquisitor Paolo Passionei described the galley in correspondence to Cardinal Secretary of State Silvio Valenti Gonzaga as "a beautiful, new and sturdy vessel ... constructed considerably higher than the Maltese galleys and has a beautifully sculptured poop, partly gilded and partly painted." By 6 April, the Ottoman sultanate had been made aware of the loss of the Lupa and had reportedly began seeking to recover the vessel.

Mustafa and the other Ottoman captives became slaves upon their arrival in Malta, although Mustafa received special treatment due to his high rank. Cara Mehmed converted to Christianity, took the name of Giovanni Battista and was employed as a groom to Grand Master Manuel Pinto da Fonseca, and some of the other liberated slaves were also employed by the Hospitallers, including as soldiers and executioners. Mustafa remained formally enslaved until he was released on 5 May 1749 due to French efforts as a result of the Franco-Ottoman alliance. While in Malta, he plotted to instigate a slave revolt on 29 June 1749 in an attempt to take over the island, but the plot was uncovered and many conspirators were tortured and executed. Some of the individuals liberated in the Lupa revolt were also involved in the 1749 plot, and three of them – Giovanni Battista, Giuseppe Antonio di Duegnas and Antonio Boiamas – were executed. Mustafa himself was not punished due to French intervention, and he left Malta on a French ship in 1751.

The Lupa was broken up after Mustafa's departure from Malta.

== See also ==
- Corona Ottomana, another Ottoman ship on which a slave revolt occurred in 1760

== Bibliography ==
- Cassar, Kenneth; Grillo, Rachel (2024). Betrayal and Vengeance: The Slaves' Conspiracy of 1749 in 19 Historical Drawings. Heritage Malta. ISBN 978-99186-19-9-00.
- Zammit, William (2023). Slavery, Treason and Blood: The 1749 Plot of the Slaves in Malta. Heritage Malta. ISBN 978-99186-19-14-6.
