= Corona Ottomana =

The Corona Ottomana (also called the San Salvador) was an Ottoman galley ship known for being the site of a slave revolt by Christian slaves in 1760.

== Slave uprising ==
On 2 June 1760 the Corona Ottomana left Constantinople with 750 men on board, including 71 Christian slaves. Its mission was to collect taxes from the Levant on behalf of the Ottoman Treasury.

The slaves captured the ship whilst the other men were on land collecting taxes. Led by Petar Želalić, they sailed the ship to Hospitaller Malta.

Once in Malta the ship was renamed the San Salvador, and added to the squadron of the Knights Hospitallers.

"The Corona Ottomana was re-named San Salvatore. The ship was instated into the Orders’ ship of the line squadron by November 1760. However the Sultan in Constantinope was infuriated at these new developments and vowed to besiege Malta and regain what was rightfully his. War preparations in Malta soon followed and the whole island was put on a state of alertness. Huge sums of money were spent to get the island ready for an impeding Turkish attack. Only through the intercetion of the King of France; Louis XV was an attack on Malta diverted. The San Salvatore was sold to France and transported back to Constantinople."

== See also ==
- Lupa, another Ottoman ship on which a slave revolt occurred in 1748
