= 1749 Muslim slave revolt plot in Malta =

Failed assassination plot and slave rebellion in Malta

Conspiracy of the Slaves
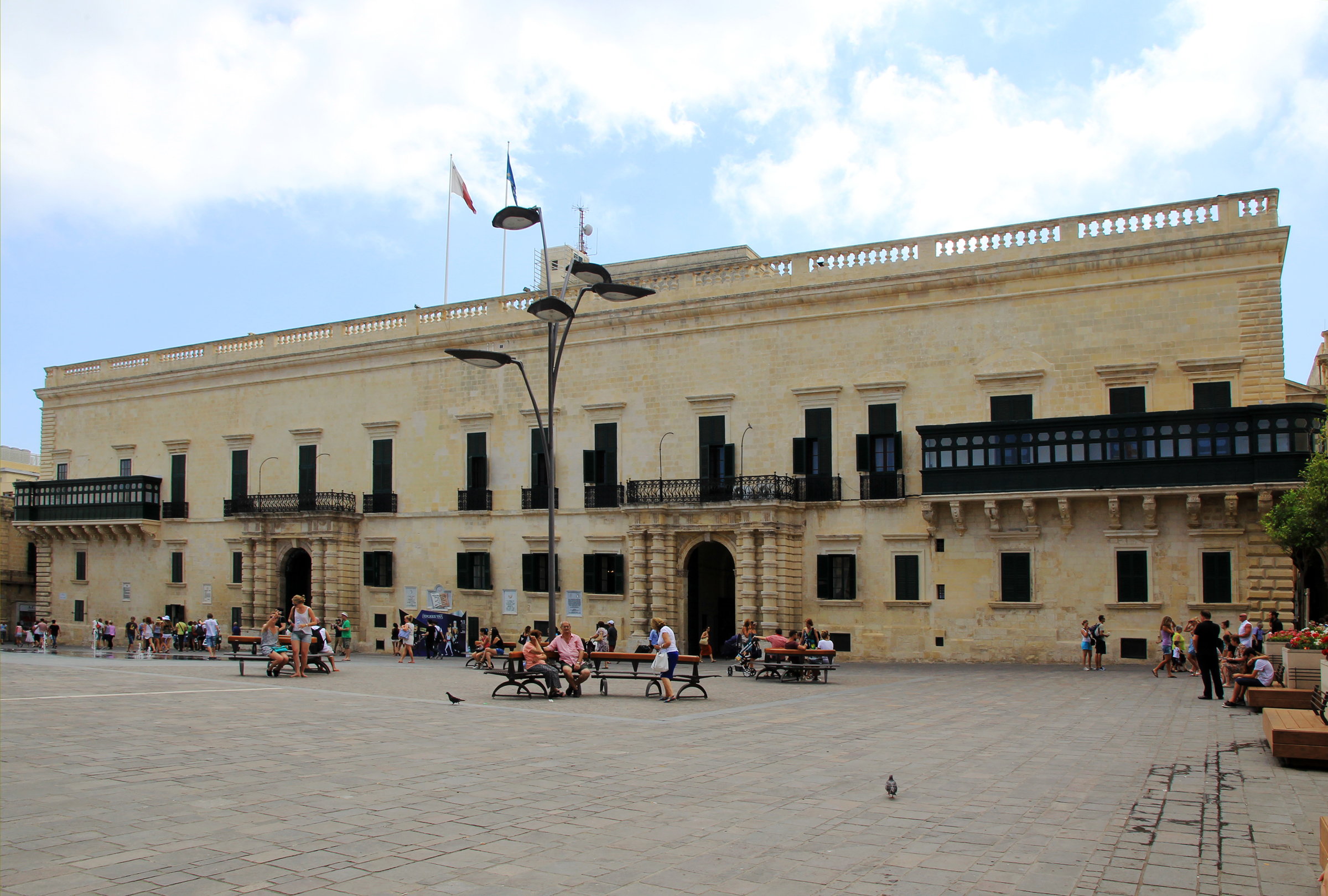
- The Grand Master's Palace – the location of the planned revolt – as photographed in 2014
- Native name: Konfoffa tal-ilsiera
- Date: 6 June 1749 (discovery); 29 June 1749 (planned revolt)
- Location: Valletta, Hospitaller Malta; 35°53′55″N 14°30′51″E
- Type: Planned assassination and slave rebellion
- Target: Manuel Pinto da Fonseca; Order of St. John
- Organised by: Mustafa, Pasha of Rhodes
- Outcome: Plot foiled
- Sentence: 35 executed 3 died in custody (2 during or after torture, 1 by suicide); 72 condemned to the galleys

The Conspiracy of the Slaves (Maltese: il-konġura tal-ilsiera or il-konfoffa tal-ilsiera; Italian: congiura de schiavi) was a failed plot by Muslim slaves in Hospitaller Malta to rebel and assassinate Grand Master Manuel Pinto da Fonseca of the Order of St John, in an attempt to facilitate the capture of Malta by the Ottoman Empire in June 1749.

The plot is believed to have been instigated by Mustafa, Pasha of Rhodes, an Ottoman official who had been captured following a revolt by Christian slaves on his galley Lupa in January 1748. He was enslaved upon the galley's arrival in Malta in February 1748, but he was given comfortable living quarters due to his high rank and he was formally freed in May 1749 following French intervention due to the Franco-Ottoman alliance.

The revolt involved a planned takeover of the Grand Master's Palace and other key locations in Valletta and Birgu, an uprising among slaves on board the Hospitaller galley squadron, and naval support from the Barbary states and the Ottomans. The uprising was to take place on 29 June 1749, but plans leaked to the Hospitallers in advance, and the plot was foiled before it could be implemented.

Some 150 people – including Muslim slaves and Christian neophytes – were arrested and interrogated under torture in the subsequent trials. 35 were executed between July and October 1749, while 3 others died in custody and 72 were condemned to the galleys. Due to French influence, Mustafa was not punished for his role in the plot, and he returned to Constantinople in 1751.

== Background and prelude ==
During the mid-18th century, Malta was ruled by the Knights Hospitaller. At the time slavery was practiced throughout both Christian and Muslim-ruled territories around the Mediterranean, and the majority of slaves on the Maltese Islands were Muslim men who had been captured at sea by the Hospitaller fleet or by Malta-based corsairs. Some were forced to work as galley slaves while others worked on land as labourers and had a variety of duties ranging from manufacturing to domestic roles. The slave population typically stood at around 2,000 people, although some sources claim that in 1749 there were up to 9,300 slaves in Malta. The proportion of slaves was higher in Malta's main urban area around the Grand Harbour, where slaves constituted about 10% of the population.

Although there were laws which prevented slaves from interacting with the Maltese people, these were not regularly enforced and some slaves worked as merchants and sold wares in the streets and squares of the capital Valletta. At night publicly-owned slaves were confined to prisons known as bagnios: the main one was the Gran Prigione in Valletta, while similar prisons existed in the cities of Birgu and Senglea. Slaves were allowed freedom of religion and were able to gather for prayers.

Although large-scale slave revolts were a rare occurrence, several successful escapes and unsuccessful escape attempts by Muslim slaves in Malta are known to have occurred prior to 1749. These include a 1531 attempt to take Fort St. Angelo, uprisings on the galleys Caterinetta and San Giacomo in 1548 and 1557 respectively, and a 1596 mass escape attempt from Valletta. In 1609, suspicions were raised that slaves were planning to poison bread in order to facilitate a Muslim invasion of Malta, and in 1627 slaves were accused of plotting to poison bread at the Grand Master's Palace in order to assassinate Grand Master Antoine de Paule.

=== Lupa revolt ===
In January 1748, Hungarian, Georgian and Maltese slaves on board the Ottoman galley Lupa revolted, massacred most of the crew, commandeered the ship and imprisoned the remaining Ottomans on board, including Mustafa, the former Pasha of Rhodes. Among the planners of this revolt was Cara Mehmed, a Muslim slave who had been granted freedom by Mustafa's father but who had continued to be treated as a slave by Mustafa. The rebel slaves sailed the ship to Malta, where they arrived in the beginning of February. Mustafa was subsequently enslaved, although he received special treatment due to his high rank, initially being accommodated in comfortable living quarters at Fort Saint Elmo before being moved to a house in Floriana in July 1748.

On 5 May 1749, Mustafa was freed from slavery following French efforts to procure his release as a result of the Franco-Ottoman alliance. He refused offers of leave the island upon his release, claiming that he wanted instructions from the Ottoman sultanate before doing so. Cara Mehmed also remained in Malta, and in June 1748 he was baptised as a Catholic and was given the baptismal name of Giovanni Battista. He married a Maltese woman (Note: Some sources incorrectly claim that it was Mustafa rather than Cara Mehmed who converted to Christianity and married a Maltese woman.) and obtained employment as a liveried groom to Grand Master Manuel Pinto da Fonseca.

== Plot ==
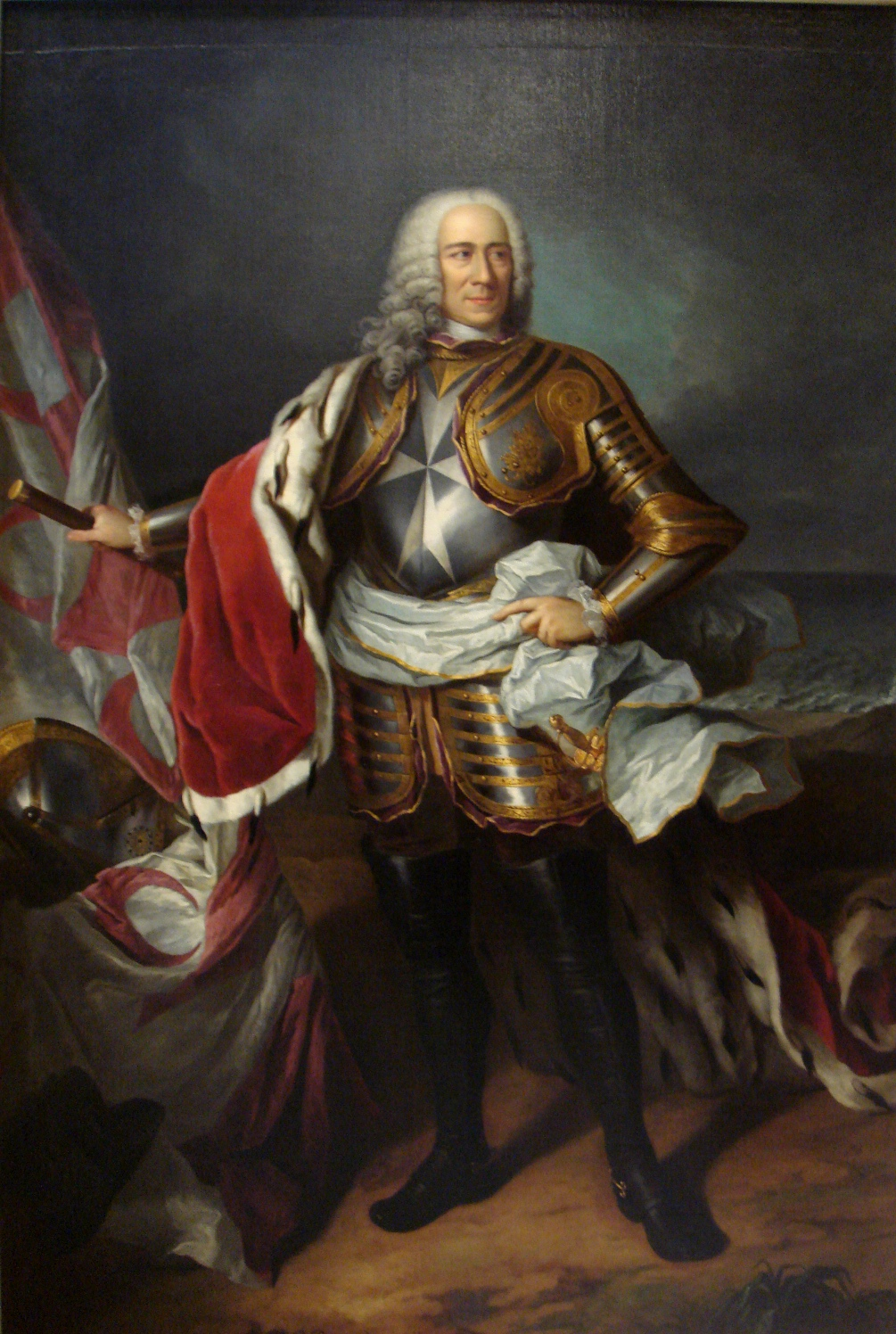
Grand Master Manuel Pinto da Fonseca, as depicted in an 18th-century portrait by Pierre Bernard

At the time of his capture, Mustafa's governorship of Rhodes had just ended and he had been expecting to be appointed to another post. He is believed to have been motivated to attempt to take over Malta by instigating a slave revolt in order to redeem his honour and regain favour with the Ottoman sultan. Mustafa orchestrated the plot through the use of other people as intermediaries, and he made efforts to ensure that he would not be blamed personally if the plot was discovered prematurely. Mustafa was able to discuss the planned revolt with other conspirators while he was living in Floriana. At least two meetings are known to have taken place; Mustafa was personally present in the second one, and all those involved took an oath of secrecy. The plotters included Pinto's valet Imselleti, Rais Hassan, Mishud, the papasso Haec Musa, and Giovanni Battista (formerly Cara Mehmed).

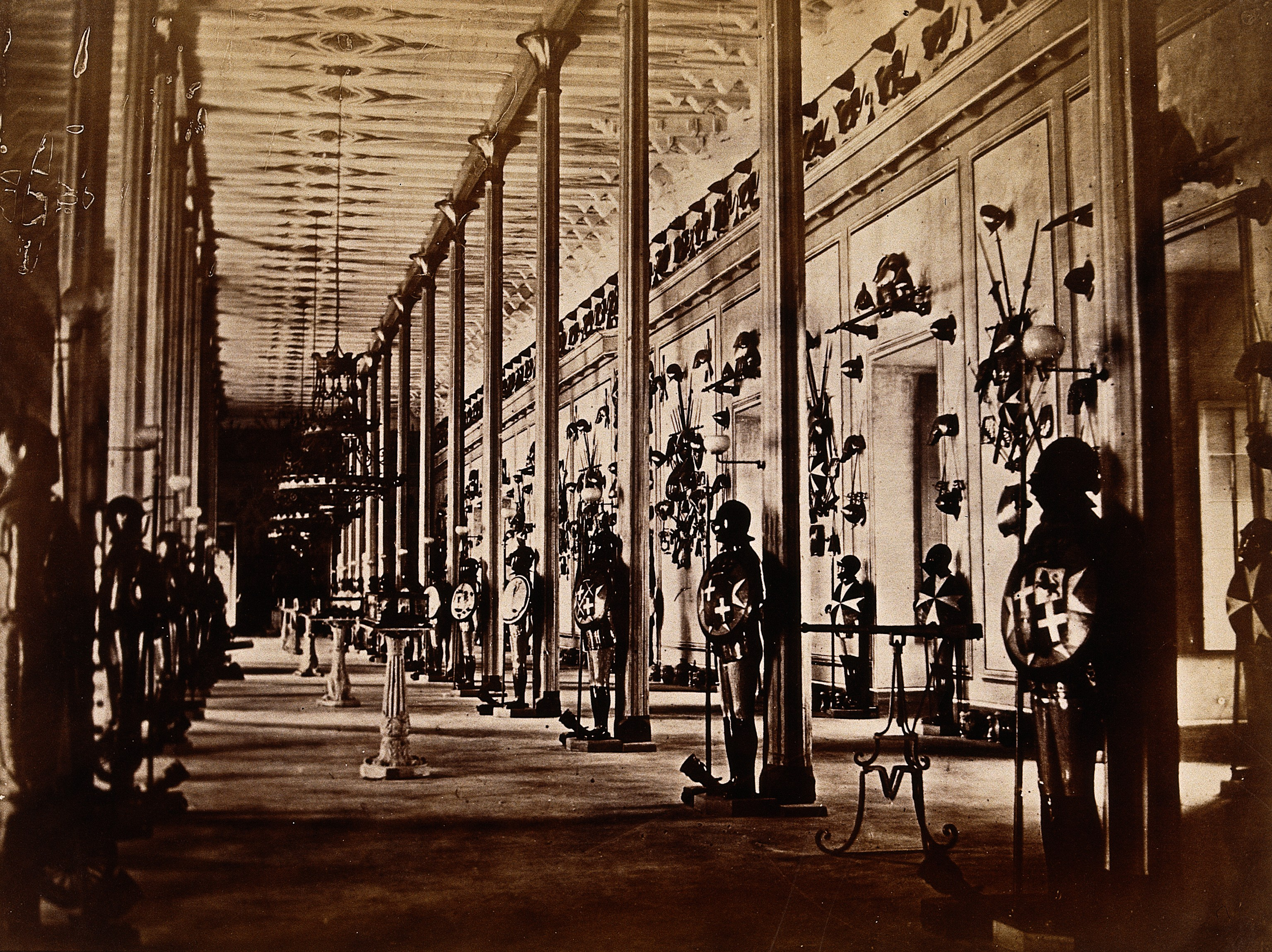
Valletta's Palace Armoury – from where the slaves planned to arm themselves – as photographed by Horatio Agius, c. 1881

The revolt was planned to take place on the day of the feast of Saints Peter and Paul (Maltese: L-Imnarja). At the time, Valletta was expected to be quiet since many people would be celebrating the festivities in the inland city of Mdina and the nearby Boschetto, while the Hospitaller naval squadron would be at sea. Although this meant that the galley slaves could not be part of the land-based revolt, there would be fewer soldiers and sailors who could put down the rebellion. Between 1,000 and 1,400 slaves are believed to have been on the island at the time.

Three days before the revolt, Mustafa planned to ask Pinto to allow him to move back to Fort St. Elmo after claiming that the air in Floriana was causing him harm. The uprising was to commence with Pinto's assassination at around 14:00 on 29 June 1749, following a celebratory banquet at the Grand Master's Palace. Imselleti was to kill the Grand Master using a poisoned knife, aided by Giovanni Battista and some other slaves. The assassins then planned on throwing a vase into one of the courtyards and exposing Pinto's head. This was a signal for the remaining slaves to rise up, kill the other Christians within the palace and take over the Palace Armoury, where they would arm themselves.

A simultaneous uprising was planned among the slaves working in the Forni della Signoria, who were to link up with the palace slaves and then proceed to free and arm the other Muslims in the Gran Prigione. They then planned to assault Fort St. Elmo, while Mustafa was to lead an uprising within the fort itself to facilitate its takeover and allow him to take charge of the uprising.

Further revolts were planned in the Birgu and Senglea bagnios upon a signal from St. Elmo; the slaves in these cities were to occupy Fort St. Angelo and capture stores of gunpowder. The revolt was intended to be the prelude for an Ottoman takeover of Malta, and Mustafa secretly arranged for naval assistance from the North African regencies of Tunis, Tripoli and Algiers and from the Ottomans in the Morea and Constantinople, who were to send a fleet to enter Malta's harbours following a signal from St. Elmo.

A separate uprising was planned among the slaves on board the Capitana, San Luigi and San Nicola, the three ships which constituted the Hospitaller naval squadron. Before these ships departed Malta on 5 May, Mustafa had distributed arsenic to a group of galley slaves who were to find an opportune moment to poison the knights and rise up, take over the ships and sail them back to Malta to support the uprising on land.

== Discovery and aftermath ==
=== 6–7 June 1749 ===
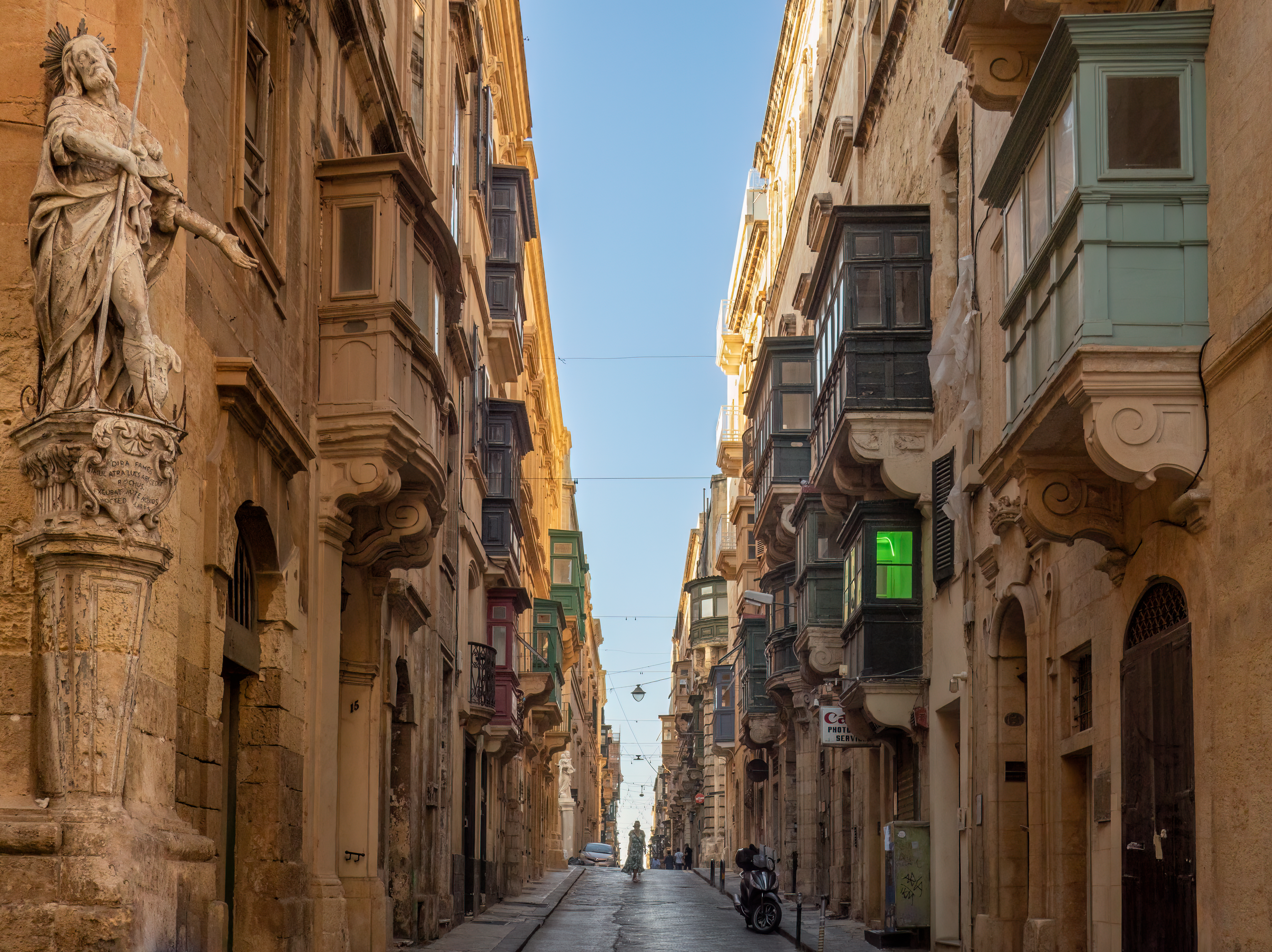
St Christopher's Street – where Cohen's coffee shop was located – as photographed in 2023

On the evening of 6 June 1749, three conspirators – the papasso Ibrahim, Giovanni Battista, and a Persian neophyte employed in the Grand Master's guard named Antonio de Viguier – met inside a tavern or coffeehouse in Strada Fontana (now St Christopher's Street) in Valletta and attempted to persuade Giacomo Cassar, a soldier in the guard of Armenian origin, to join in the plot. This was not the conspirators' first attempt to recruit him, and a quarrel ensued when Cassar refused and he was physically assaulted by Giovanni Battista. The tavern's proprietor – Giuseppe Cohen, a recent convert from Judaism to Catholicism – overheard parts of the conversation and confronted Cassar, who told him about the plot. (Note: Some sources incorrectly claim that Cohen learnt of the plot after the conspirators attempted to recruit him directly, rather than from Cassar.)

Cohen persuaded Cassar to meet him at dawn the following day so that they could notify the Grand Master of the conspiracy together. At around 20:00, Cassar revealed what he knew of the plot to his commanding officer, the Knight Commander de Viguier, (Note: The Knight Commander de Viguier was likely the godfather of the guard Antonio de Viguier, and the latter likely took the former's surname upon his baptism.) but the latter did not understand the significance of this due to a language barrier. De Viguier asked Cassar to meet him the following day with an interpreter, and at around 22:00 de Viguier notified Pinto of what he knew so far.

On 7 June, Cassar did not show up to his planned meeting with Cohen, so the latter went alone to the palace and requested an audience with Pinto. He informed the Grand Master of what he had learnt from Cassar, corroborating de Viguier's account and providing additional details. Since Cassar had been aware of the plot for weeks prior to 6 June, it was Cohen who received the credit for uncovering the plot rather than Cassar.

=== Trials, torture and executions ===
The Castellania (labelled "Z") as depicted on a 17th century map of Valletta. The building which existed in 1749 was demolished and replaced by the building which still exists today in 1757–1760.

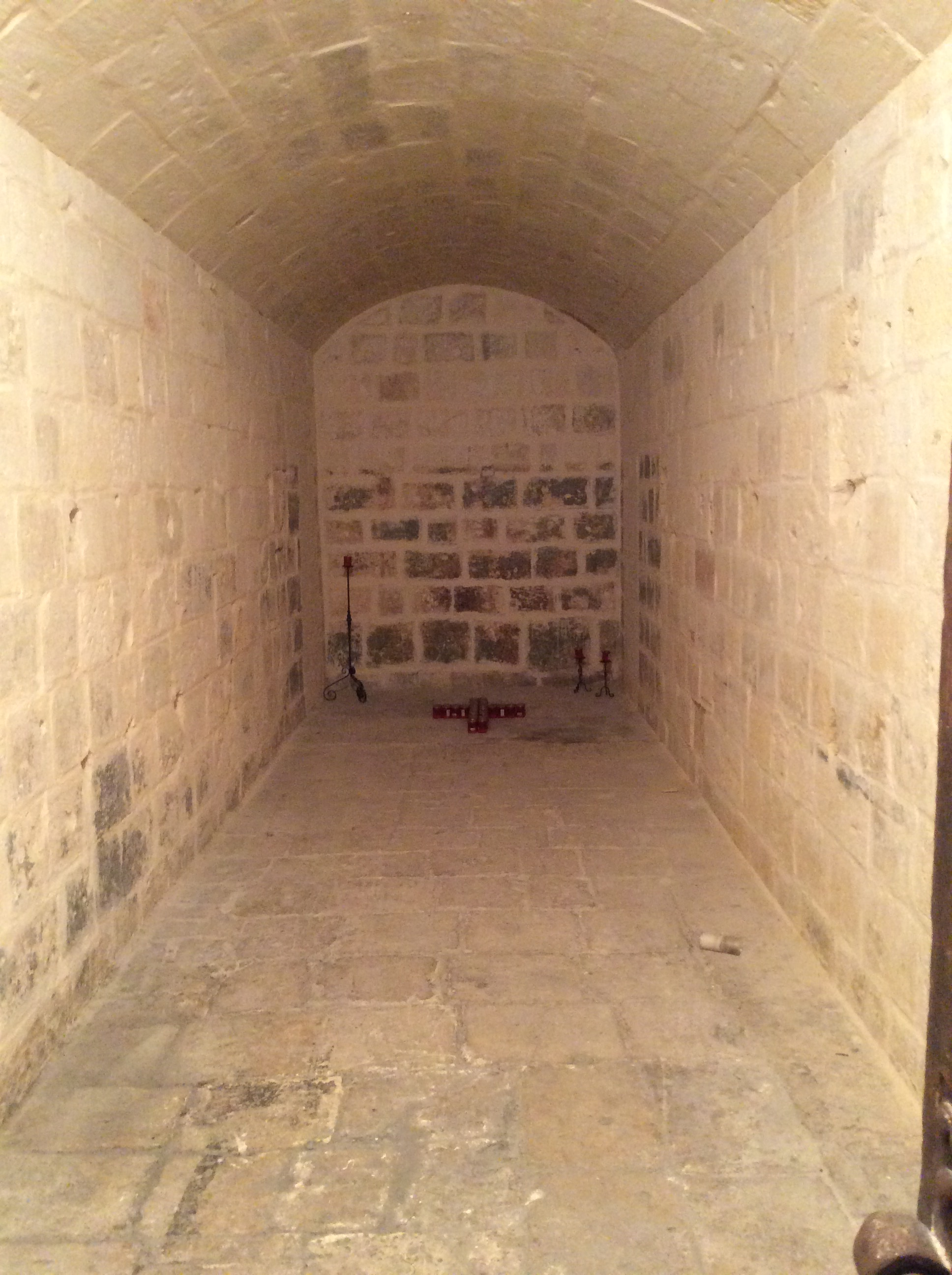
Prison cell in the Castellania as photographed in 2016

The trial of the conspirators was held at the Gran Corte della Castellania in Valletta. Cassar was the first to be interrogated, followed by Giovanni Battista and Antonio de Viguier who were arrested on 8 June. Interrogations initially began without the use of torture, but Pinto directly authorised the use of torture on Giovanni Battista in an attempt to compel him to reveal more information about the plot. He was subjected to the corda and cavalletto and quickly confessed and named some of the other slaves involved. He never named Mustafa, suggesting that he had been unaware of the latter's role in the plot.

When the seriousness of the plot was realised, Pinto ordered that the trial be administered according to military lines; this effectively removed limitations on the use of torture, allowed for longer interrogations, and restricted the proceedings in secrecy. Three judges – Giacomo Nataleo, Giulio Cumbo and Pietro de Franchis – were appointed, while Carlo Guicciardi and Fortunato Bencini led the prosecution and the notaries Onorato Grillet Sciberras and Pietro Antonio Buhagiar served on the tribunal.

De Viguier was the second person to be interrogated using torture, and other individuals followed suit as more details of the plot and names of other conspirators were revealed. Following further confessions, Mustafa was suspected of being the mastermind behind the plot by 21 June, and a week later he was placed under house arrest.

By 5 July, around 80 slaves were implicated in the plot and had been tortured. On that day two slaves – Haec Musa and Mishud – were paraded through the streets of Valletta while being beaten and tortured with pincers, before they were executed by being quartered by boats rowing in separate directions in the Grand Harbour; this is the only recorded instance of quartering ever being used in Malta. Prior to their execution, attempts were made to compel the slaves to convert to Christianity; Mishud agreed to be baptised while Haec Musa did not.

One slave died during torture on 10 July; his body was subsequently buried at the Marsa mosque. By mid-July, several Greek Christians were also under suspicion of being involved in the plot. On 21 July, four slaves were tortured with pincers while being paraded through Valletta bound on carts, before they were executed outside Porta Reale. Two who had been baptised prior to execution were strangled while those who refused baptism were stabbed to death; the bodies of all four were beheaded post mortem.

Giovanni Battista, two Muslim slaves (one of whom was baptised), and two Christian soldiers in the Grand Master's guard were executed on 23 July. The Christians were strangled and beheaded post mortem, while the Muslim was tortured with pincers before being beheaded. Four palace slaves were executed on 28 July; all were tortured with pincers, and two who were baptised were strangled and beheaded post mortem while two who were not were beheaded alive.

64 Muslim slaves were sentenced to serve on the galleys on 3 August. Three slaves and two free Christians including Antonio de Viguier were executed on 5 August. Two of the slaves were baptised prior to execution; one of these was strangled before being beheaded while the other was hanged. The slave who refused baptism was tortured with pincers before being strangled and beheaded, while the two Christians were strangled. Seven other slaves – six of whom were Muslim religious leaders known as papassi – were executed on 9 August by being strangled and beheaded; five of these died as Muslims and were tortured with pincers prior to being executed, while two who had been baptised were spared the additional torture.

When the Hospitaller galley squadron returned to Malta in September, some of the galley slaves were tortured after being suspected of being involved in the plot. On 27 September, a slave on board the galley San Nicola confessed that there had been a plot to poison the crew and soldiers and then sail to Algiers. One of the galley slaves committed suicide in prison on 11 October, and four galley slaves were executed on 14 October while three others along with a free neophyte were executed on 16 October. Those executed in October were all baptised, and were strangled before their bodies were beheaded. Two days later, eight slaves were whipped and branded with the letter R (for ribelli) beneath their right eyes, and were condemned to be rowers for life. On 1 November, another Ottoman slave who had been implicated in the plot died after falling ill following torture. Investigations and torture continued after poison was discovered hidden in the kitchen of the Grand Master's Palace in June 1750, but no further executions are known to have taken place.

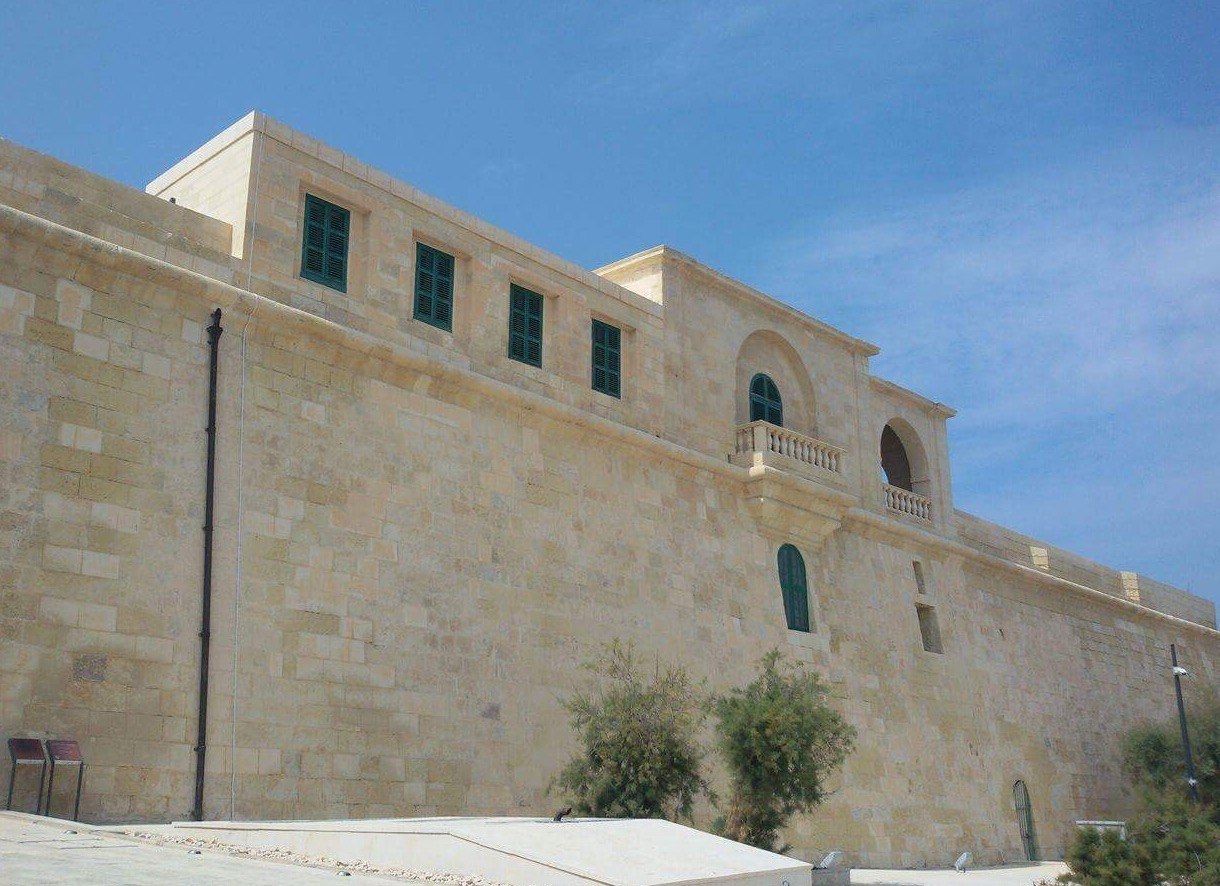
Walls of Fort Saint Elmo – where the severed heads of some of the executed slaves were displayed – as photographed in 2016

In total, the trial involved 151 suspects. The 35 people who were executed included 29 Muslim slaves (17 of whom converted to Christianity prior to execution) and 6 free Christians (3 of whom had previously participated in the Lupa revolt). (Note: Some sources incorrectly claim that 125 people were executed in total; this is not supported by primary sources.) Two others died during or after being tortured, one committed suicide, and 72 others were condemned to the galleys (including 8 who were branded). The severed limbs of those quartered and the heads of those beheaded were displayed publicly at Fort St. Elmo, Fort St. Angelo and Fort Ricasoli after the executions. The headless bodies of those beheaded were burnt, with those who had died as Muslims being burnt separately from those who were Christians (including the newly-baptised). The burnt remains of the latter subsequently received a Cristian burial. Property owned by those executed was auctioned off in September 1749.

=== Maltese and Hospitaller reactions ===
The plot prompted an increase in anti-Muslim and anti-Turkish sentiment within the Maltese population, and several violent incidents are known to have occurred in the days after the plot was foiled. On 19 June 1749, before Mustafa was placed under house arrest, a group of Valletta residents threatened to stone him while he was going around the city with attendants and a carriage. The next day, villagers from Birkirkara, Qormi and Naxxar armed themselves and attempted to march to Mustafa's residence in Floriana but were held back by the Hospitaller authorities.

On 22 June, a mob of some 8,000–10,000 Maltese gathered outside the Floriana residence and once again threatened to stone or lynch Mustafa. Pinto sent reinforcements to guard the Pasha, who was moved to more secure quarters at Fort St. Elmo the following day. On 25 June, another mob mainly composed of youths attacked and ransacked the mosque in Marsa; the Hospitallers had to send soldiers to restore order and to prevent them from burning it down.

On 29 June, the day of the planned revolt, the Hospitallers raised a red Ottoman flag on Fort St. Elmo in order to deceive any Muslim ships which might attempt to provide naval assistance to the would-be rebels. Cannons along the fortifications were loaded as a precaution, and 400 men commanded by the Grand Falconer held a parade throughout the streets of Valletta.

After the revolt was foiled, numerous rumours arose, including that Mustafa had been planning to take the throne of Malta for himself and that he wanted to convert the monastery of St Ursula into a seraglio, that Imselleti was to have been given the monastery of St Catherine to satisfy his lust, and that the conspirators were planning to massacre Maltese babies, execute Hospitaller knights, burn clergy alive, convert churches into stables, and present virgin women as slaves to the sultan in Constantinople while keeping other women for themselves.

Between June 1749 and January 1750, laws governing the movement of slaves were made stricter. They could not go outside city limits, and were not to approach any fortifications. They were not allowed to gather anywhere except their mosque, and were to sleep only in bagnios. They could not carry any weapons or keys to government buildings.

The thwarting of the plot was commemorated by several thanksgiving celebrations in the churches of Valletta and Birgu in August and September 1749. On 6 June 1750 – the first anniversary of the plot's discovery – public processions were held throughout Malta. That date continued to be celebrated as a day of thanksgiving in subsequent decades.

=== Reward for Giuseppe Cohen ===
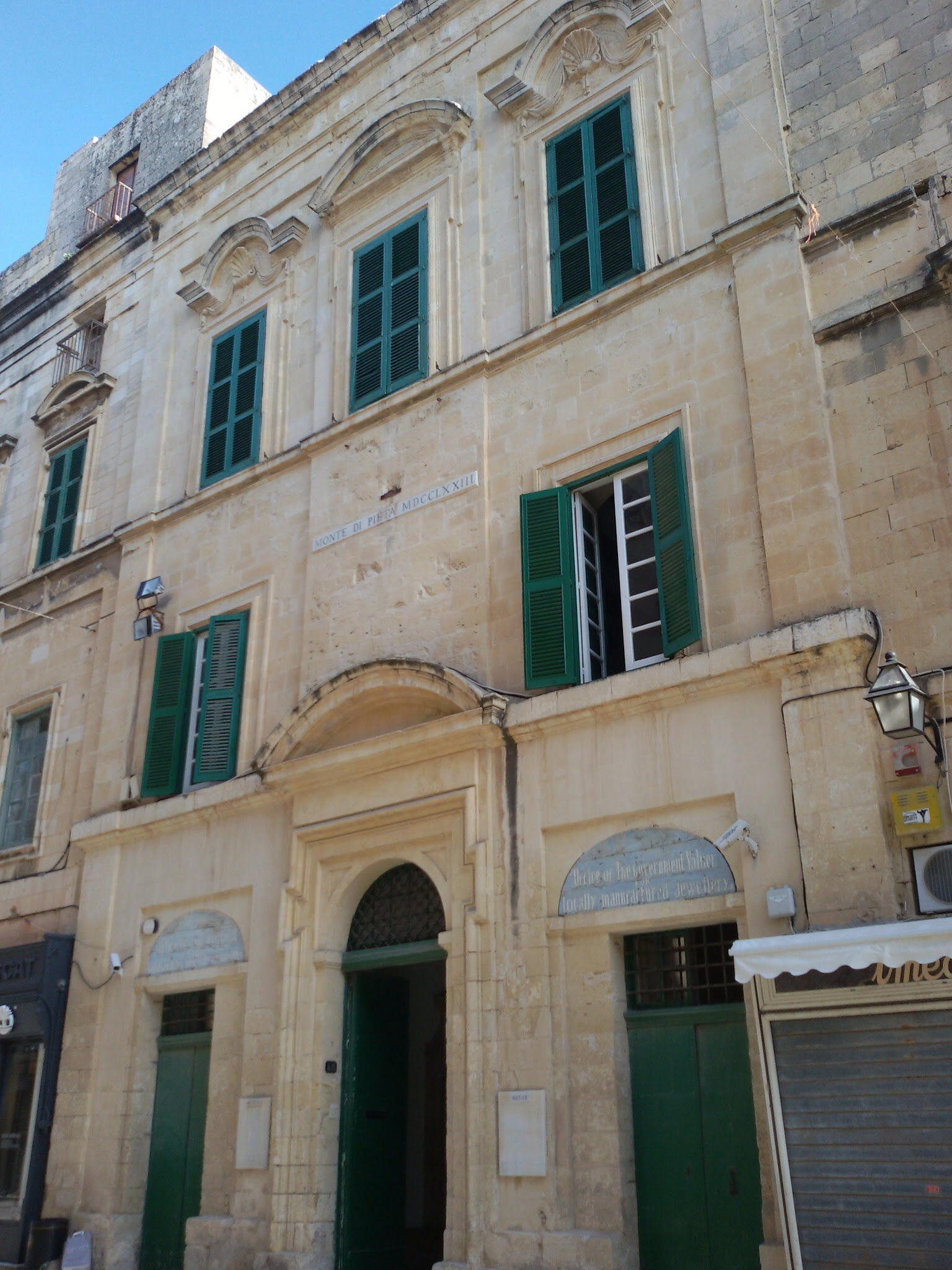
The house in Valletta which was given to Giuseppe Cohen as a reward for revealing the plot – now housing the Monte di Pietà

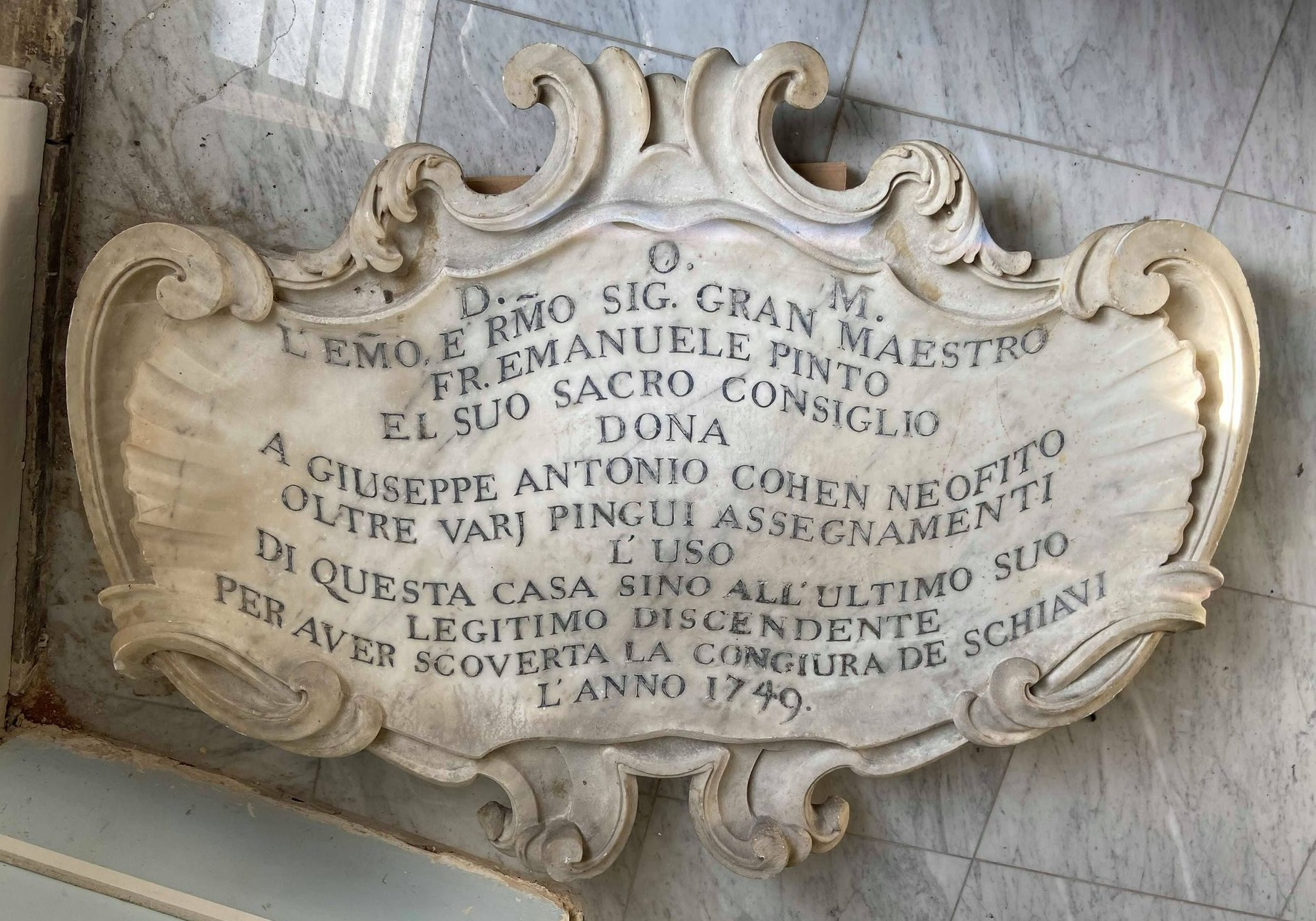
Plaque which was affixed to the door of the above house, now in the storeroom of the National Museum of Archaeology.

In recognition for his role in uncovering the conspiracy, Cohen was given an annual pension of around 750 scudi and he was granted the right of enjoyment of a property in Valletta's Strada San Giacomo (now Merchants Street). A marble inscription was affixed above its door, and it read as follows:

D. O. M.

L' EMO, E RMO SIG. GRAN MAESTRO
FR. EMANUELE PINTO
EL SUO SACRO CONSIGLIO
DONA
A GIUSEPPE ANTONIO COHEN NEOFITO
OLTRE VARJ PINGUI ASSEGNAMENTI
L'USO
DI QUESTA CASA SINO ALL'ULTIMO SUO
LEGITIMO DISCENDENTE
PER AVER SCOVERTA LA CONGIURA DE SCHIAVI
L'ANNO 1749.

(meaning To God, most good, most great. The Grand Master Fra Manuel Pinto da Fonseca and his Sacred Council gives to Giuseppe Antonio Cohen, a neophyte, in addition to various large assignments, the use of this house until his last legitimate descendant, for having discovered the conspiracy of the slaves in the year 1749.)

The property which was granted to Cohen had previously been the seat of Valletta's Università until it moved to new premises in 1721. Cohen and his descendants were granted right of use on 14 August 1749, and the property remained in his family's hands until 1773, when the building was taken over to house the Monte di Pietà and the family was given an annuity as compensation. The building still exists and it continues to house the Monte di Pietà.

=== French diplomatic intervention and fate of Mustafa ===
After Mustafa had been named as the mastermind behind the plot by some of those interrogated under torture, Pinto wanted to punish and make an example of him, but at the same time he was not willing to risk alienating the French government which had secured Mustafa's freedom only weeks before the plot was uncovered. Pinto and Pope Benedict XIV wrote letters to French monarch Louis XV requesting that the latter waive his protection of the Pasha, and the fate of Mustafa was the subject of copious correspondence between the Order and its ambassadors in France and Rome, and the French government and its ambassadors in Malta, Rome and Constantinople. Mustafa also sent a letter to Ottoman grand vizier Seyyid Abdullah Pasha defending his position.

By late 1749, French ambassador to Constantinople Roland Puchot suggested that Mustafa be allowed to escape from Malta, while the French and Ottoman governments were also considering the possibility of setting up an exchange of Muslim slaves in Malta including Mustafa for Christian slaves held by the Ottomans. These negotiations fell through, and Mustafa finally left Malta on board a French ship bound for Constantinople on 13 March 1751. Mustafa's later life after returning to the Ottoman Empire is unclear, with sources making several contradictory claims regarding his subsequent fate.

== Sources and legacy ==
=== Written sources ===
The plot is described in a wide variety of published and unpublished primary sources, making it one of the best-documented events in the history of Hospitaller Malta. Following the first round of trials, the Hospitallers prepared an official report which was circulated to European courts at the end of July 1749. An updated version of the report which includes an addendum describing the second round of trials in September was presented to the Order's Council on 4 November 1749, and a copy of this has been preserved at the Archives of the Order of Malta which are held at the National Library of Malta. The Hospitallers are believed to have encouraged the dissemination of the official report, which was published in numerous pamphlets and periodicals and was translated into multiple languages including Spanish, Portuguese, French, English and German. The attempted revolt and its aftermath was reported in contemporary newspapers throughout Europe and in European colonies in the Americas, with varying degrees of accuracy.

Unofficial descriptions of the plot also circulated, but the Order discouraged or attempted to suppress such publications. Examples of these include accounts in Italian by Giuseppe Novi and by Piccolomini, Grand Prior of Barletta, an account in French by the Knight Commander de Viguier, and several accounts in Portuguese. One of the most notable and detailed accounts is Mustafà Bassà di Rodi schiavo in Malta, o sia la di lui congiura all'occupazione di Malta descritta da Michele Acciard ("Mustapha Pasha of Rhodes slave at Malta, or his conspiracy to occupy Malta as described by Michele Acciard") which was printed in Naples in 1751. Although credited to Michele Acciard, it is widely believed that Gozitan author Giovanni Pietro Francesco Agius de Soldanis had a hand in writing at least some parts of the account. The book caused considerable controversy since it attacked the Order and argued for the rights of the Maltese. This caused it to be banned in Malta, and de Soldanis was briefly exiled to Rome and had to defend himself in front of the Pope before he was allowed to return to Malta in 1752.

Unpublished sources include several eyewitness accounts by Maltese individuals, by Hospitaller knights or by foreigners who were residing on Malta at the time of the plot. The plot was mentioned in diplomatic correspondence between European consuls on Malta and their own governments, and one of the most detailed sources which have survived is the correspondence between Malta's inquisitor Paolo Passionei and Cardinal Secretary of State Silvio Valenti Gonzaga from 1748 to 1751. This source has been studied and published by historian William Zammit, who wrote a book about the plot in 2023.

=== Drawings and paintings ===
The most significant visual record of the conspiracy is a set of 19 drawings which depict the Lupa revolt, the plot, and its aftermath including the torture and executions. The drawings are an example of naïve art by an unknown artist, and they are believed to have been produced sometime after 1758, possibly by an eyewitness to the executions. Numbering on the drawings indicates that they originally formed part of a set of at least 24, but remainder are lost. The drawings generally corroborate the sequence of events noted in written sources, although they contain some inaccuracies. The surviving drawings are held by Heritage Malta and they were exhibited to the public at the Inquisitor's Palace in 2024–2025. A more fanciful rendition of the executions was depicted in a German engraving produced in 1750.

French artist Antoine de Favray produced a painting dated 1749 depicting a meeting between a group of slaves formulating the plot; this is now held at the Mdina Cathedral Museum. Favray also produced an anatomical drawing of the severed head of one of the executed slaves, Stefano Lorenzo Maria alias Ibrahim. A 1750 ex-voto painting commemorating the conversion of Carmine Giuseppe Xaverio alias Imhammet, one of the galley slaves executed in September 1749, is held at a sanctuary in Trapani, Sicily.

=== Literature ===
The poem "Fuchech Nithaddet Malta" (modern Maltese: "Fuqek Nitħaddet Malta", English: "I Talk About You, Malta"), an early example of Maltese literature, was written some time after the attempted revolt. Its author is unknown, but it is sometimes attributed to Giacomo Marchese as it was preserved among his papers. The poem includes numerous claims about atrocities that the conspirators were supposedly planning to inflict had the revolt succeeded; many of these are not mentioned in other primary sources and it is possible that these claims reflect rumours which were circulating on Malta during the trial or that they are the product of the author's imagination.

Several other poems, songs and plays were written in Italian relating to the plot, including works by Ignazio Saverio Mifsud, de Soldanis, Gaetano Reboul, Fortunato Panzavecchia, Vittorio Gristi and Pietro Andolfati; the latter wrote a play entitled La congiura di Mustafa Bassa di Rodi contro i cavalieri Maltesi: ovvero le glorie di Malta ("The conspiracy of Mustapha Pasha of Rhodes against the knights of Malta, or the glories of Malta") about the revolt in 1779.

=== Historiography and analysis ===
The plot of 1749 is the only known major attempt at slave rebellion on land in early modern Christian Europe, and it has also been described by some sources as an attempted coup d'état. Whether or not the plot could have succeeded had it not been foiled is a matter of debate. Historian William Zammit wrote in 2023 that while the assassination of Pinto and the revolt within the Grand Master's Palace "could have been carried out with relative ease", the rest of the plot including the capture of Fort St. Angelo and the takeover of the rest of Malta would have been difficult to implement, even with assistance from North Africa and the Ottoman Empire.

It is unclear what motivated Giovanni Battista to become involved in the plot after his own revolt against Mustafa and after his integration into Maltese society; sources claim that he was probably manipulated into believing that he would be the leader of the revolt, that he might have been unaware of Mustafa's involvement in the plot, or that he may have been afraid of what would happen to him had the plot went ahead without his involvement. Had the plot succeeded, it is likely that he would have been disposed of by Mustafa.

== Bibliography ==
- Cassar, Kenneth; Grillo, Rachel (2024). Betrayal and Vengeance: The Slaves' Conspiracy of 1749 in 19 Historical Drawings. Heritage Malta. ISBN 978-99186-19-9-00.
- Zammit, William (2023). Slavery, Treason and Blood: The 1749 Plot of the Slaves in Malta. Heritage Malta. ISBN 978-99186-19-14-6.
