= Pietro Gelalich =

Maltese corsair

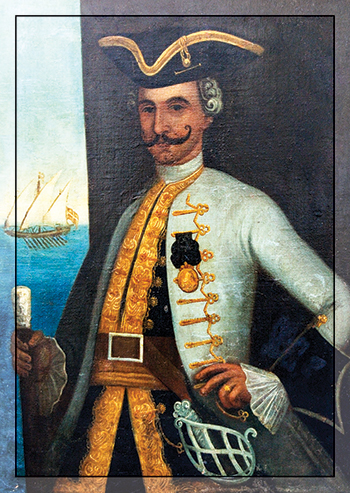
Portrait of Petar Želalić at the Maritime Museum of Kotor, Montenegro

Pietro Gelalich or Petar Želalić (Bijela, Bay of Kotor, c. 1731 – Senglea, Malta, 10 December 1811) was a Montenegrin privateer based in Hospitaller Malta from 1764 to 1795. Gelalich led the mutiny of the Turkish flagship Corona Ottomana in 1760 before distinguishing himself in the last period of the Maltese Corso.

== Origin ==
He was originally from the Bay of Kotor. His name is a phonetic transcription of the Montenegrin surname Želalić.

== The mutiny of Corona Ottomana ==
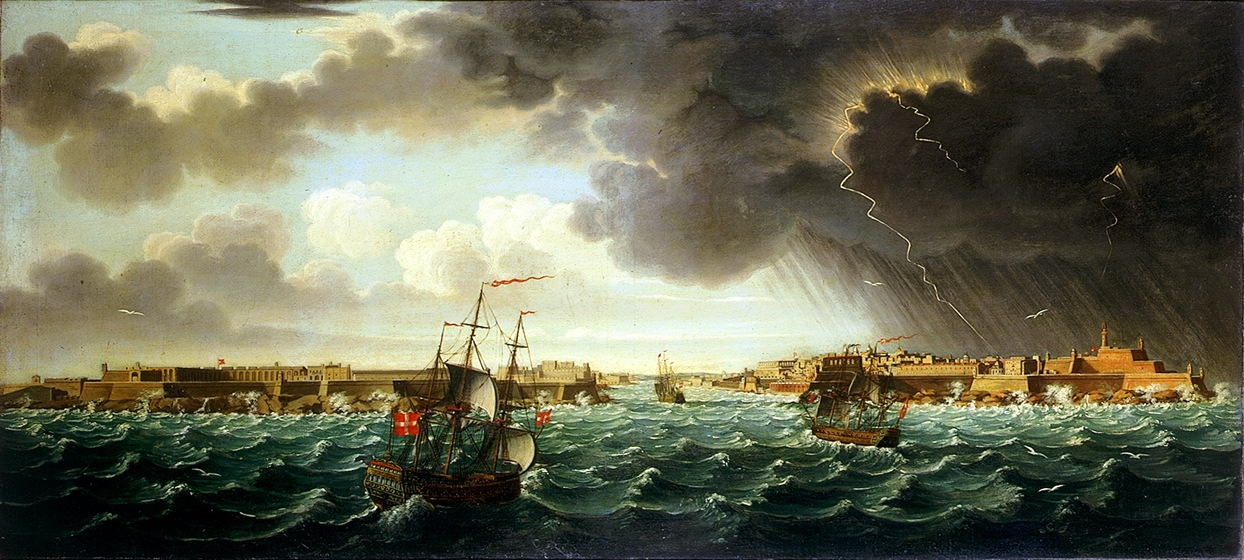
Porto della Valletta durante la tempesta, intorno al 1750

In 1760, Peter Gelalich was a slave in the crew of the Corona Ottomana, the flagship of the Ottoman fleet. The ship departed in June 1760 on a tax collection tour, with the Ottoman Grand Admiral (Capudan Pasha) on board. They stopped in Kos on 19 September 1760 for Friday prayers. The admiral and most of the soldiers went ashore; this was the opportunity the Christian slaves had been waiting for to mutiny and take control of the ship. Under the leadership of Gelalich, the insurgents managed to escape the Turkish sailors and their pursuers. The ship arrived triumphantly in the port of Valletta on 6 October 1760. The rich booty was divided among the mutineers, who decided to offer the ship to the Order of St. John of Jerusalem of Malta who welcomed them as heroes.

== Gelalich corsair ==
Gelalich was admitted to the Order of Malta as a brother in arms and commanded a galley of the Order in 1764. He then set out alone, obtained his license, bought his brig in 1768 and continued the war racing for their own profit.

His expeditions seem to have had mixed success. The consular documents provide us with some information on his activities:

- On 6 September 1778 he disturbed the French authorities because he captured four Muslim sailors who were working on a ship chartered by the French authorities for transport between Latakia and Cyprus. The Pasha of Syria then threatened the French of Latakia and the consulate had to pay a pension to the families of the sailors. The French consul was furious with Gelalich: money to be taken from empty coffers, the lack of consideration on the sailors' Cypriot passport and Gelalich's broken promise to return the sailors.
- On 3 June 1781 Gelalich was in Lampedusa on his galiota and left with Giasone Cumbi, another corsair, for an expedition to the Barbary coast. But there must have been trouble because on 2 July three Maltese corsairs, including Gelalich, shared the crew members of Cumbi's ship which caught fire.
- On 11 August 1781 the Count of Saint-Priest, French ambassador to Constantinople, wrote to his counterpart in Malta and requested sanctions from the Grand Master against Gelalich for having captured a French agent. In 1786 for this or a similar affair, Gelalich finally had to reimburse the French for the costs.
- In 1786 Gelalich captured a 28-year-old Turk named Sari Gueulli Hagi Osman between Constantinople and Thessaloniki; his family asked for his ransom.
- In January 1788, the Pasha of Crete demanded a ransom to be paid for a Tartar named Ali whom Gelalich had captured.
- On 6 October 1788, Gelalich's half galley was chased for 12 hours by five Barbary galleys.

== Personality ==
The testimonies describe a picturesque bandit, who was talked about as much on land in taverns as at sea. The Maltese inquisitor carefully watched over Gelalich like the other corsairs, distrusting these wild individuals who were free from judicial and religious rules.

It was thus reported to the inquisition that, in case the captures were missing for too long, Gelalich had had the portrait of Saint Nicholas, patron saint of sailors, brought to the upper deck and threatened to spit on him if the saint did not help him to capture some ship. Even more seriously for the inquisition, Gelalich was suspected of sodomy with a young sailor named Marco, whom he had once beaten for catching him flirting with another sailor. But perhaps the irony of fate was that he was caught eating meat on Good Friday, much to the horror of her servant, her husband and a fellow privateer.

== End of career ==
Gelalich ended his career abruptly in 1795, after his crew mutinied and claimed his spoils. He then retired ashore in Senglea, amid comfort and general respect.

Pietro Gelalich died on 10 December 1811 in Senglea (L-Isla). He was buried in the Church of the Assumption in Birgu. The church and his tomb were destroyed during the bombings of the Second World War.
