= Cara Mehmed =

Ottoman Tripolitanian slave and rebel

Cara Mehmed (Note: The alternative spelling Cara Mehmet is used in some sources, and he is sometimes referred to as Cara Ahmed. Italian language primary sources also refer to him by the nicknames of il Negro or il Moro (Negro or Moor).) (c. 1723–1749) was a slave from Ottoman Tripolitania who was one of the leaders of a successful slave rebellion on board the Ottoman galley Lupa in January 1748. After gaining his freedom, he converted from Islam to Christianity, took the name of Giovanni Battista Emanuele Pinto and entered the service of Grand Master Manuel Pinto da Fonseca in Hospitaller Malta. In June 1749, he was implicated in a slave revolt plot which was orchestrated by his former master Mustafa, Pasha of Rhodes, and he was subsequently executed by the Hospitallers.

== Early life, Lupa revolt and life on Malta ==
Cara Mehmed was born in Tripoli, Ottoman Tripolitania in around 1723. Sources describe him as being a Muslim of Ethiopian descent who had a large stature. He was a slave to Suleiman, an Ottoman man from a distinguished family, and he gained an esteemed position in his service. Although his master manumitted him shortly before his death in 1740, Suleiman's son Mustafa kept Cara Mehmed as a slave and treated him poorly.

In January 1748, while on board Mustafa's galley Lupa, Cara Mehmed and fifteen other slaves rebelled, massacred most of the crew, imprisoned the remaining Ottoman personnel and passengers including Mustafa, and took control of the vessel. They sailed to Malta and reached the island on 1 February. After a month of quarantine at the Lazzaretto of Manoel Island, the rebel slaves received an enthusiastic welcome by the Knights Hospitaller who at the time ruled the island.

Cara Mehmed won the favour of Hospitaller Grand Master Manuel Pinto da Fonseca, who apparently sought to protect him from possible reprisals from other Muslim slaves due to his role in the Lupa rebellion. On 24 June 1748 Cara Mehmed was baptised as a Roman Catholic at the parish church of St Paul in Valletta. Pinto acted as his godfather in absentia, and he was given the Christian name of Giovanni Battista Emanuele Pinto (combining the names of Hospitaller patron saint John the Baptist and of the Grand Master). After his baptism, Giovanni Battista was employed by Pinto as a liveried groom, and on 5 August 1748 he married Francesca Azzopardi, a Maltese woman from Valletta.

The couple later had a girl named Anna Maria who was baptised on 12 July 1749. Giovanni Battista became a well-known figure in Valletta, and sources mention that he was admired by all and that he used to distribute money to children.

== Plot of 1749, trial and execution ==
Cara Mehmed's former master Mustafa became a slave following his capture, but he was treated well by the Hospitallers in recognition of his high rank and he was formally freed on 5 May 1749 following French diplomatic intervention. While on Malta, Mustafa attempted to instigate a slave rebellion among the Muslim slaves; the plan was that on 29 June 1749 a group of slaves were to assassinate the Grand Master and take control of key locations in Valletta and Birgu. This was to be followed by an invasion of the island by the Ottoman Empire and the Barbary states. Despite his previous rebellion against Mustafa and his integration into Maltese society, Giovanni Battista was actively involved in this plot; his role was to aid the slave Imselleti in murdering Pinto with a poisoned knife. Sources claim that Giovanni Battista might have been manipulated into believing that he would be the leader of the revolt, that he might have been unaware that Mustafa was behind the plot, or that he may have been afraid of what would happen to him had the rebellion went ahead without his involvement. Had the plot succeeded, it is possible that he would have been disposed of by Mustafa.

On 6 June 1749, while in a tavern in Valletta, Giovanni Battista and two other conspirators attempted to persuade Giacomo Cassar, a soldier in the Grand Master's guard, to join in the plot. Giovanni Battista physically assaulted Cassar when the latter refused to get involved, prompting the tavern's proprietor Giuseppe Cohen to throw the conspirators out, after which he confronted Cassar who told him what he knew of the plot. Cassar later also informed his commanding officer while Cohen informed Pinto, revealing the plot to the Hospitallers a few weeks before it could be put into action.

Giovanni Battista was arrested on 8 June and he was subsequently interrogated at the Gran Corte della Castellania. He initially denied knowledge of the plot and apparently almost convinced the judge and prosecutor of his innocence, but Pinto directly authorised the use of torture in an attempt to compel him to reveal more information about the plot. He was subjected to the corda and cavalletto and he quickly confessed and named some of the others who were involved. He never named Mustafa, suggesting that he had indeed been unaware of the latter's role in the plot.

Many other slaves and Christian neophytes were interrogated using torture over the next few weeks, and 35 were executed between July and October 1749. Giovanni Battista was among those sentenced to death, and he was executed on 23 July 1749 along with four other conspirators. The condemned were paraded through Valletta bound on carts, and some were tortured with pincers prior to execution. Whether Giovanni Battista was subjected to such torture or whether he was spared is unclear as primary sources contradict each other on this detail. He was then strangled and his body was beheaded and burnt post mortem.

Francesca Azzopardi witnessed the execution of her husband, and she is said to have died of grief shortly afterwards.

== Bibliography ==
- Cassar, Kenneth; Grillo, Rachel (2024). Betrayal and Vengeance: The Slaves' Conspiracy of 1749 in 19 Historical Drawings. Heritage Malta. ISBN 978-99186-19-9-00.
- Zammit, William (2023). Slavery, Treason and Blood: The 1749 Plot of the Slaves in Malta. Heritage Malta. ISBN 978-99186-19-14-6.
