= Forni della Signoria =

Bakehouse in Malta

- Bakery of the Order
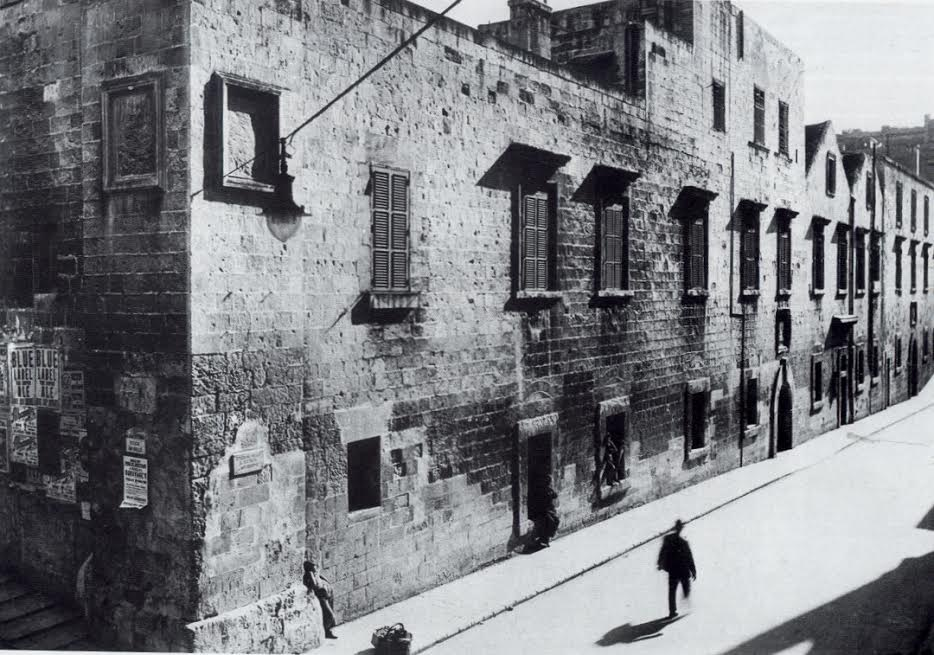
- View of the bakehouse, c. early 20th century
- Interactive map of the Forni della Signoria area

General information
- Status: Demolished
- Type: Bakehouse
- Architectural style: Mannerism
- Location: Valletta, Malta
- Coordinates: 35°53′53″N 14°30′39″E
- Completed: c. 1583–1584
- Demolished: 1926
- Owner: Treasury of the Order (1580s–1798); French Republic (1798–1800); British Government (1814–1921); Maltese Government (1921–1926)

Technical details
- Material: Limestone
- Floor count: 3

Design and construction
- Architect: Girolamo Cassar

The Forni della Signoria (Maltese: L-Ifran tas-Sinjurija; English: Bakeries of the Grandmaster) was a bakehouse in Valletta, Malta. It was constructed in the late 16th century by the Order of St John, and it consisted of a number of bakeries which produced bread for the inhabitants of Valletta and the surrounding area, as well as for the Order's garrison and navy.

It remained in use by the French and later the British militaries, until a new Royal Naval Bakery was opened in Birgu in 1845. The bakery was subsequently converted into stores, before falling into disrepair. The building was demolished in the early 20th century to make way for the Vincenti Buildings. The bakery gave its name to Old Bakery Street, one of the main streets of Valletta.

== History ==
=== Background ===
The first prominent bakeries for the Order were built in Birgu in 1545. In 1566 Architect Francesco Laparelli designed a plan for a new city, Valletta, where all public and prominent buildings were to be in a reserved area. Among these buildings were the Forni della Sacra Religione.

Small individual bakeries were first built on site, which had existed since the 1570s. These bakeries were built during the magistracy of Grand Master Jean de la Cassière at his own expense, and were known in Italian as the Forni pubblici della religione (Public Bakeries of the Religion). The bakeries were among the first erected buildings in Valletta. According to Leonard Mahoney (1988), similar to the first buildings of Valletta, these bakeries were built for convenience of the first wave of workers and migrants rather than keeping also in mind the aesthetic appeal of architecture. Thus, these bakeries can be considered to have had a vernacular architecture to a certain extent.

The reserved area, generally known as the collachio, was toyed about for years and was eventually abandoned as it proved not practical for business, administration and the rest of inhabitants of the city. However, more or less, the mentioned buildings occupied the designated area.

=== Construction and use ===
The Order's bakery was being planned by 1582 and an engraving by Matteo Perez d’Aleccio of Valletta including the planned bakery was drawn up that year. The building was marked as Il Forno d.la Signoria et l’Armaria, meaning part of the building had to also include an armoury to serve in case of a siege. This also because it was mainly intended to serve the military. It was eventually built in around 1583 or 1584, during the magistracy of Grand Master Hugues Loubenx de Verdalle. The building was designed by Maltese architect Girolamo Cassar, who also designed many other buildings in Valletta. As planned, the building was used primarily for the making of bread, while another part of the edifice was used as an armoury or ferreria. Other food products from similar ingredients of bread, such as biscuits, were also made. In the 17th century a mill room was added to the building.

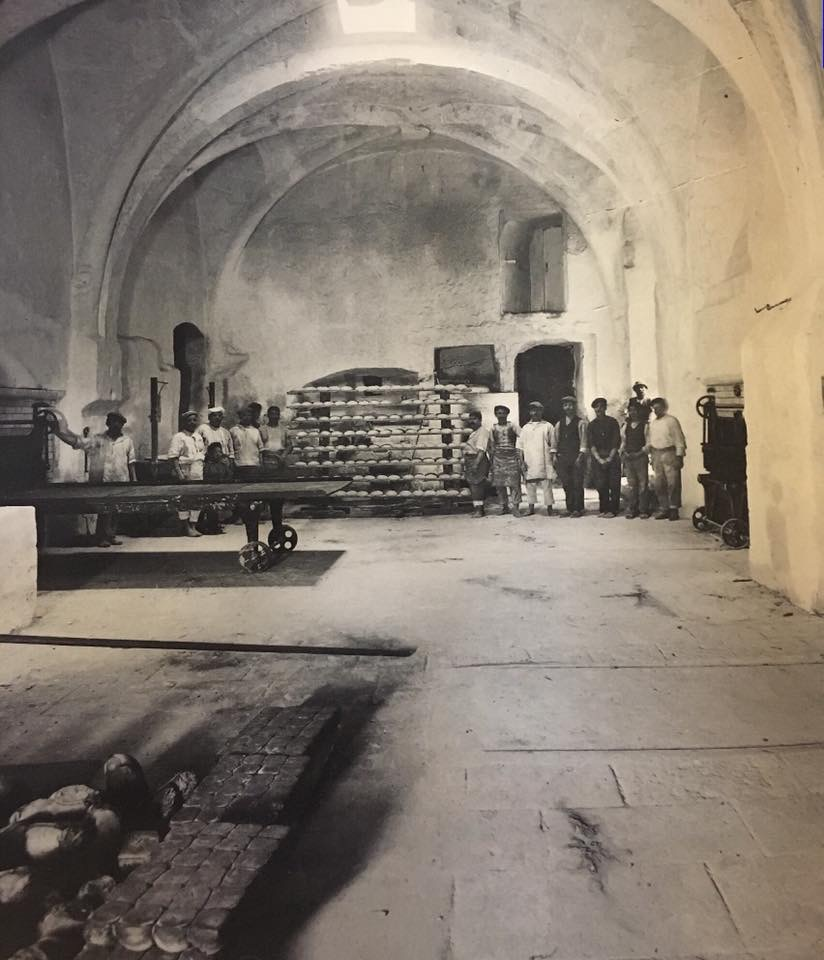
Interior of the bakery while still in use during the British period

The building was property of the Treasury of the Order, and under the responsibility of the Castellan. The building was rented, each part to different owners, however was administered by one person known as Commendatore dei Forni (Bakeries’ Commander). The owners were to sell bread at an established price. The bakery produced most of the bread for the inhabitants of Valletta and Floriana, as well as for the Order's hospital, prison, galleys and garrison.

Some of the expenses for the operation of the bakery were relieved as a number of slaves were engaged in forced unpaid labour. Only trusted slaves were allowed to work at the bakery. However, after the revolt of the slaves during the magistry of Grand Master Manuel Pinto da Fonseca, none of the slaves were trusted in important buildings such as the bakery which provided traditional everyday food. The incident followed by a shortage of bakers in Valletta that villages bakers were ordered to do so on site and those who refused to bake bread in the city were jailed by the Castellania for a roughly a week.

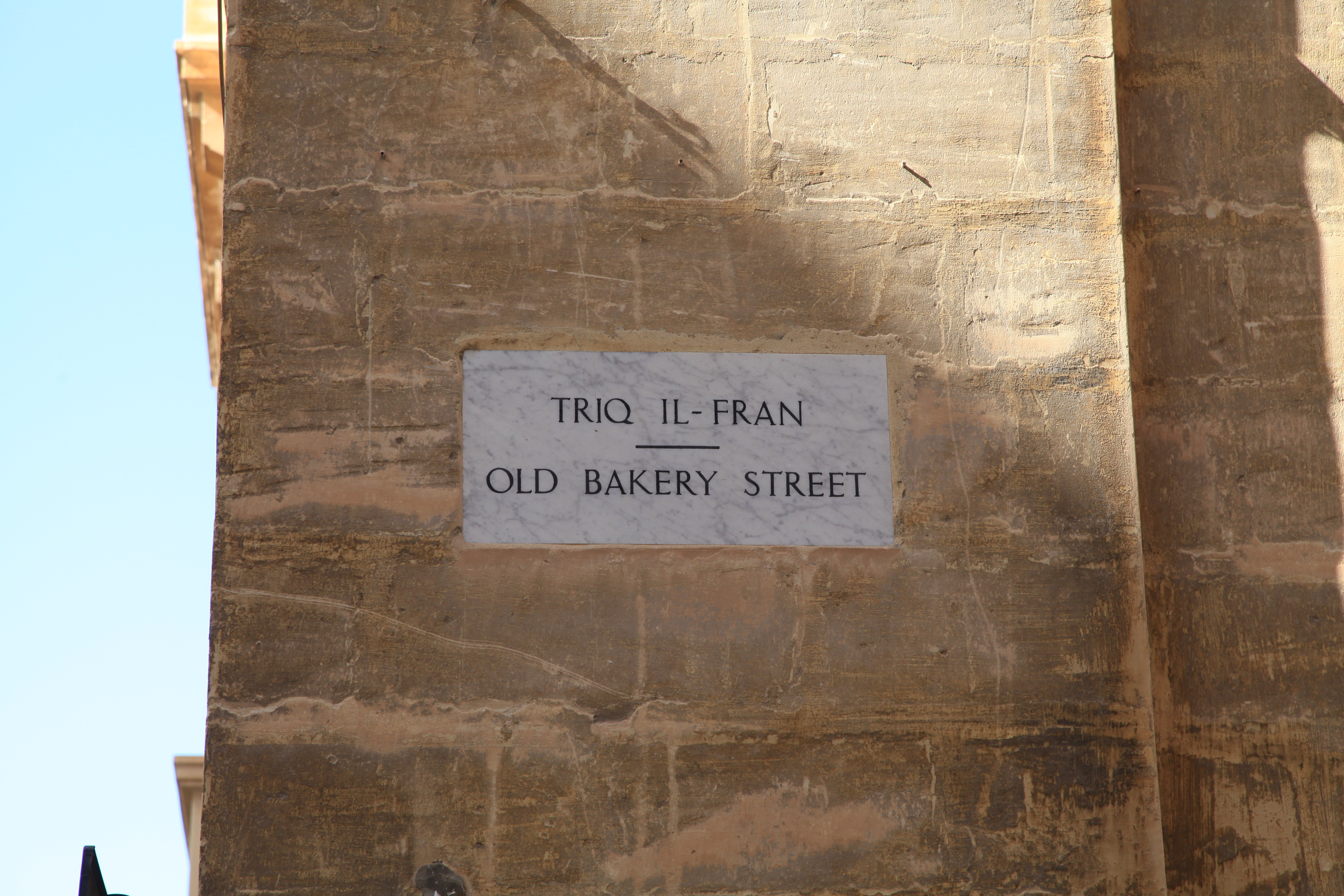
The building gave its name to Strada Forni, now Old Bakery Street

During the French occupation of Malta, the bakery was used to produce bread for the French garrison, and it was heavily guarded during the blockade of 1798–1800. At this point, the street where the bakery was located, originally called Strada San Giovanni Battista, was renamed Rue des Fours after the bakery. It was later known as Strada Forni in Italian during the early British period, and since 1926 it has been called Old Bakery Street. It is known as Triq il-Fran or Triq l-Ifran in Maltese, but it is still commonly called Strada Forni by Valletta residents. This means that the bakery gives the name to a main street in the capital Valletta.

At some point, during the British period, the building became known as the Forni Regii or the Majesty’s Bakery. It was also known as The King’s Bakery. In 1824 the upper floor, which housed the armoury, was handed over to the British military. The bakery remained in use throughout the early 19th century, supplying bread to the British military. The British Army prominently used it as a colonial department, which stored and supplied food for the troops stationed in Malta, better known as the Commissariat. The British also used it for the grinding of corn.

It fell out of use when the Royal Naval Bakery was opened in Birgu in 1845. It was initially used as stores, but the building fell into a state of disrepair. An English boy is said to have died when part of the building collapsed while he was playing there.

=== Demolition ===
The bakery was demolished in 1926. The Times of Malta published an article accompanied with a photo to inform the general public that the bakery was demolished and not destroyed by war. The newspaper stated:

No! this building has not suffered from an aerial bombardment; it is the Knights' Bakery in Old Bakery Street that is in the process of demolition to make way for a better and more imposing building.

=== Redevelopment and remains ===
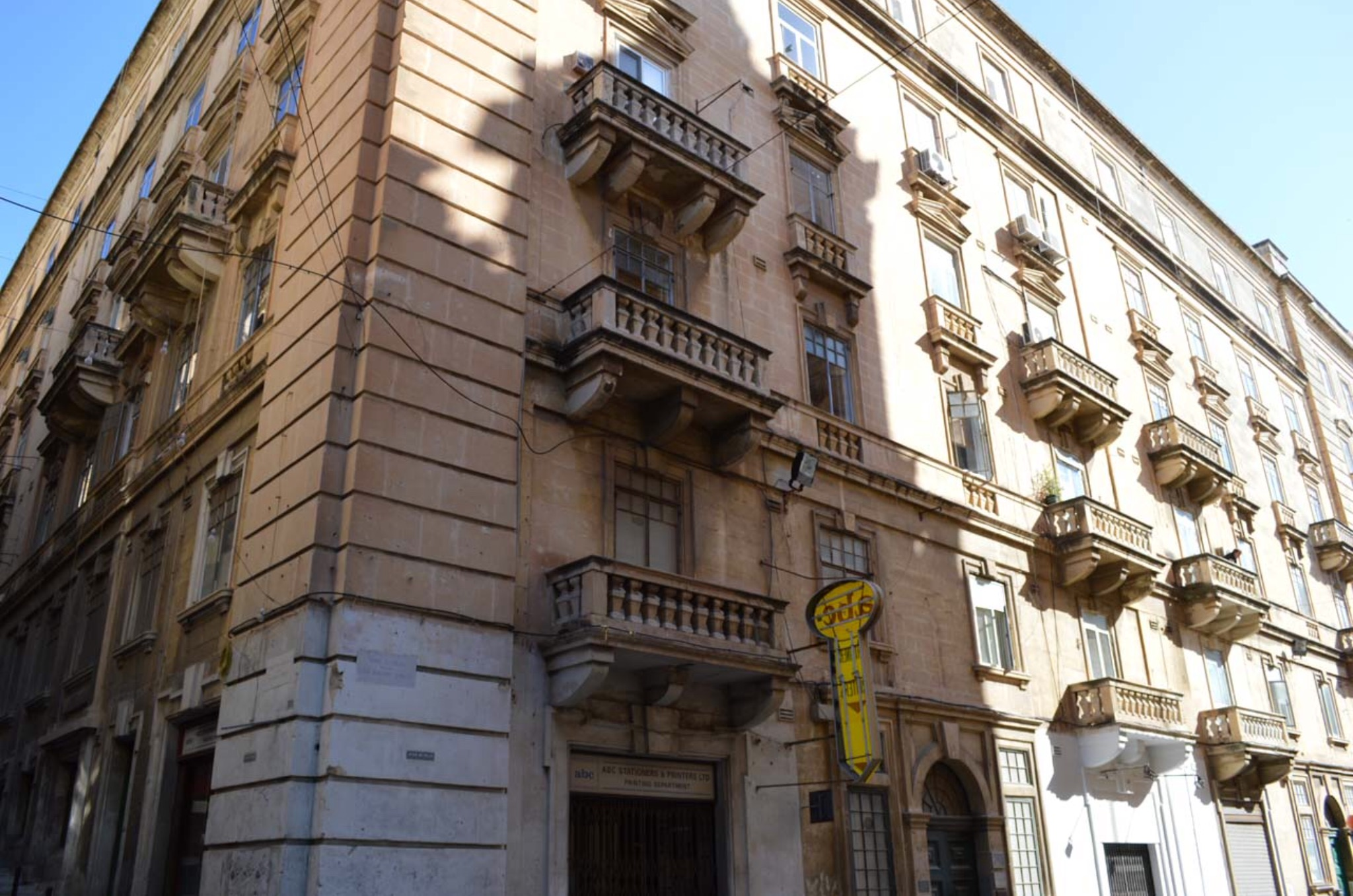
The Vincenti Buildings, the place where the bakery stood

In the mid-1930s the site was purchased by the architect Gustavo R. Vincenti. He raised a Modernism (Art Nouveau or simply an Art Deco) block, known as Vincenti Buildings after its architect in 1938. Vincenti Buildings were damaged during WWII but were faithfully repaired to the original design. Some of the residences have been converted into offices.

In March 2010, Enemalta workers uncovered remains of the bakery's foundations during paving works in Strait Street. The remains consist of sections of a wall up to four courses high and laid on bedrock. Other remains were also found at Melita Street across Old Bakery Street. A detailed wooden model of the bakery, probably dating back to the British period, is found at the Heritage Malta reserve collection at the Inquisitor's Palace in Birgu.

== Architecture ==
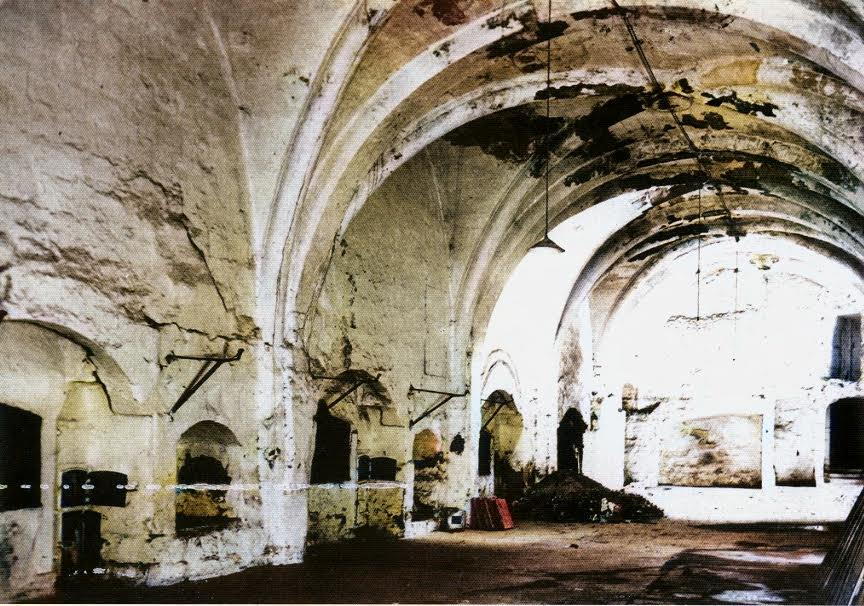
Interior of the building

The bakery of the Order was located on a city block bordered by Old Bakery, Melita, St. John and Strait streets. Its main façade was in Old Bakery Street facing the Church of St. Augustine, and it consisted of a central bay with two sloped roofs, with three-storey high sections on either side. It had imposing corners, typical of Architect Cassar, which were characterised by large rusticated pilasters to support the massive building.

The façade was asymmetric and had no moulding. It contained two main doorways, but there were other entrances in Strait Street. The exterior was plain, contrasting with other Valletta buildings, however this was typical when built. Though the exterior may not have had any aesthetically pleasing features, the interior was spacious and adequate for its purpose. Similar to other prominent buildings, the bakery was provided with water from the Wignacourt Aqueduct. The building did not suffer damage during the 1693 Sicily earthquake though, as documented, the surrounding buildings did.
