= Pinto's Loggia =

- It-Tribuna ta' Pinto
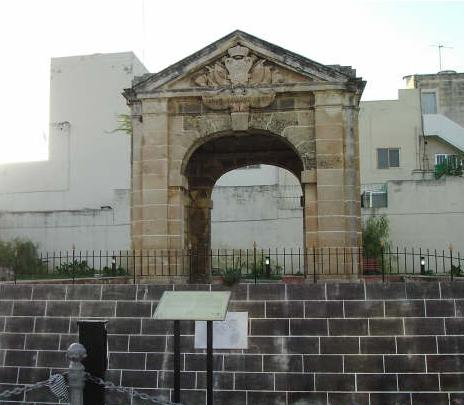
- View of Pinto's Loggia
- Alternative names: Pinto's Lodge

General information
- Status: Intact
- Type: Loggia
- Location: Qormi, Malta
- Coordinates: 35°52′35.2″N 14°28′36.1″E
- Named for: Manuel Pinto da Fonseca
- Completed: 1772

Technical details
- Material: Limestone

Pinto's Loggia or Pinto's Lodge (Maltese: It-Tribuna ta' Pinto - Il-Loġġa ta' Pinto), is a loggia in Qormi, Malta. It was built in 1772 to commemorate the 31st year of Manuel Pinto da Fonseca's magistracy, and it is now a landmark and symbol of Qormi.

== History ==
Pinto's Loggia was built in 1772, marking the 31st year of the reign of Manuel Pinto da Fonseca as Grand Master of the Order of St. John. Qormi had been granted city status as Città Pinto on 25 May 1743, and the city still bears Pinto's coat of arms as its symbol. The structure is supported by four columns, and it is decorated with Pinto's coat of arms and a Latin inscription. According to tradition, Pinto used to sit in the loggia to shade himself while watching horse racing, but its original purpose is still unclear.

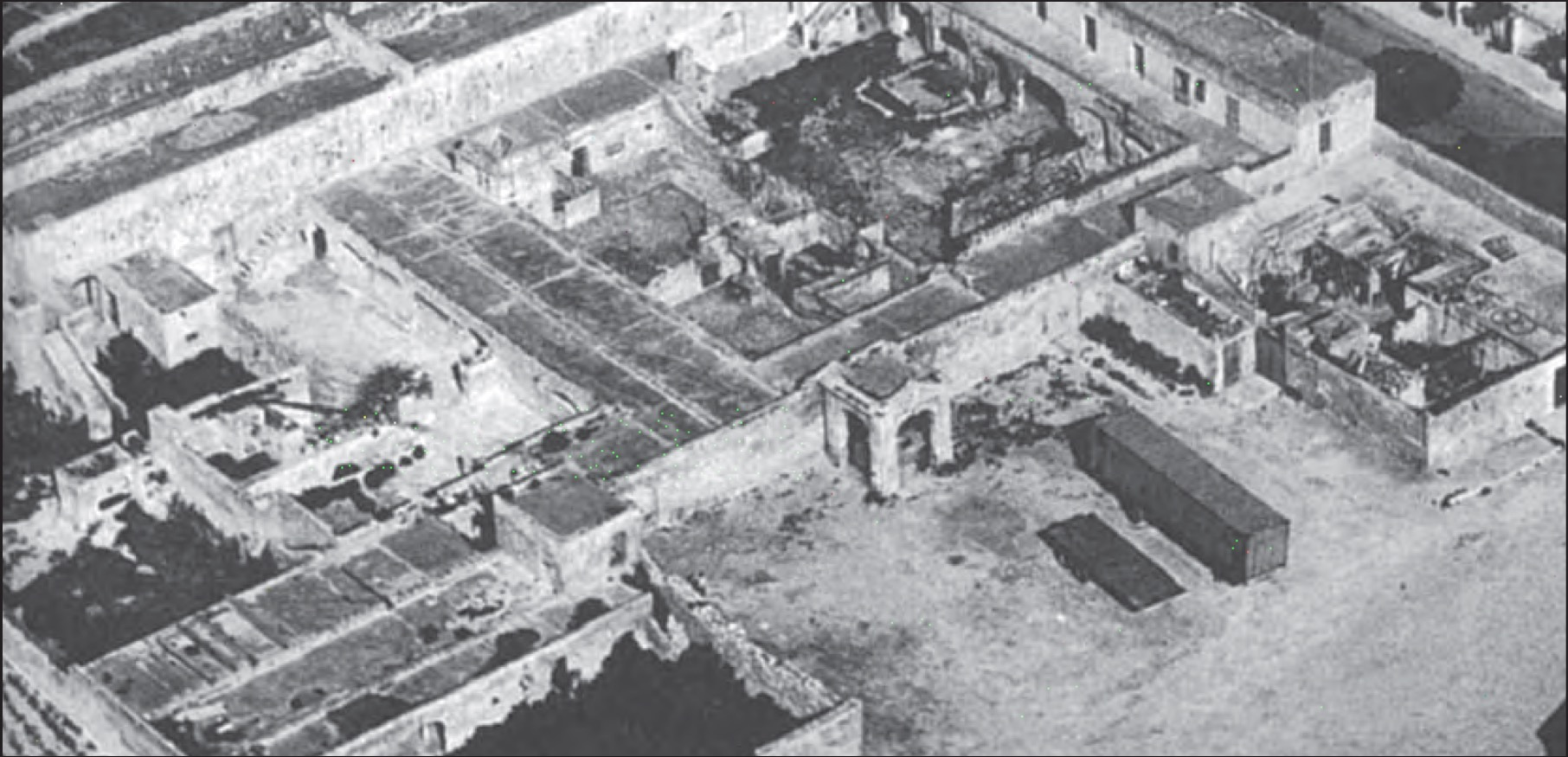
The farmhouse complex, used as stables

The loggia was originally part of a large farmhouse complex which included stables for the Grand Master's horses, but the farmhouses were demolished in 1981 to make way for modern houses. The Parish Church of St. Sebastian was later built in the vicinity of the loggia.

The loggia was restored in 1987 in 2002 and again in 2018 by the Local Council. A street market is held in the street and square near the loggia every Saturday morning, and it also serves as a backdrop for the annual Ħal Qormi Day.
