= Manuel Pinto da Fonseca =

Portuguese nobleman

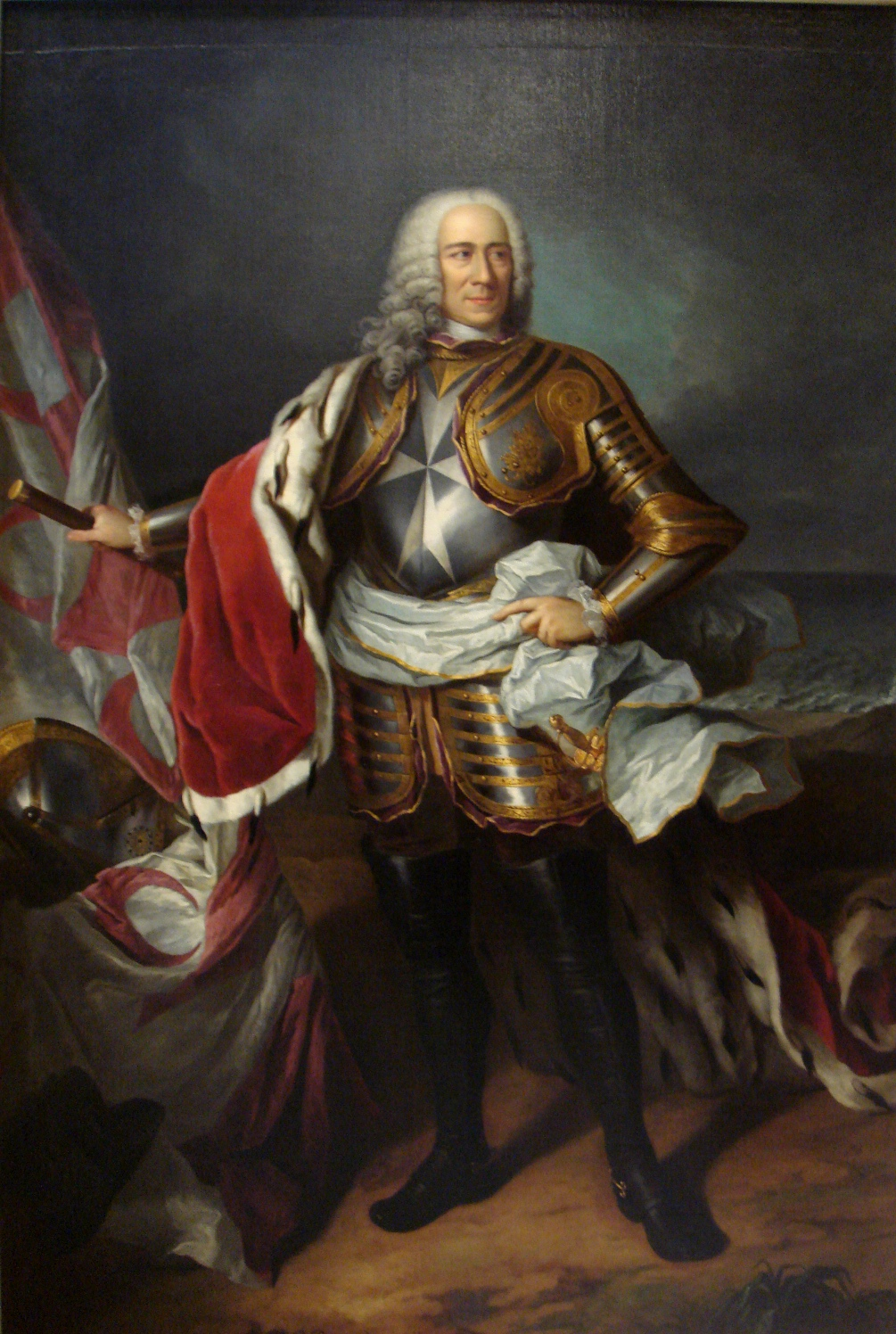
- Portrait by Pierre Bernard (1704-1777)

Grand Master of the Order of Saint John
- In office 18 January 1741 – 23 January 1773
- Monarch: King Charles V (until 1753)
- Preceded by: Ramon Despuig
- Succeeded by: Francisco Ximénez de Tejada

Personal details
- Born: 24 May 1681 Lamego, Kingdom of Portugal
- Died: 23 January 1773 (aged 91) Valletta, Hospitaller Malta
- Resting place: St. John's Co-Cathedral
- Relations: Rosenda Paulichi
- Children: José António Pinto da Fonseca e Vilhena

Military service
- Allegiance: Kingdom of Portugal (Sovereign Military Order of Malta) Order of Saint John

Manuel Pinto da Fonseca (also Emmanuel Pinto de Fonseca; 24 May 1681 – 23 January 1773) was a Portuguese nobleman, the 68th Grand Master of the Order of Saint John, from 1741 until his death.

He undertook many building projects, introducing the Baroque style throughout Malta. The cost of these projects contributed to bankrupting the Order in the decades following his death. His views were comparatively liberal. In 1764, he agreed to the re-unification with the Protestant Prussian branch of the Order, without, however, receiving the approval of Pope Clement XIII. The pope did agree, reluctantly, to the expulsion of the Jesuits from Malta in 1768.

== Biography ==
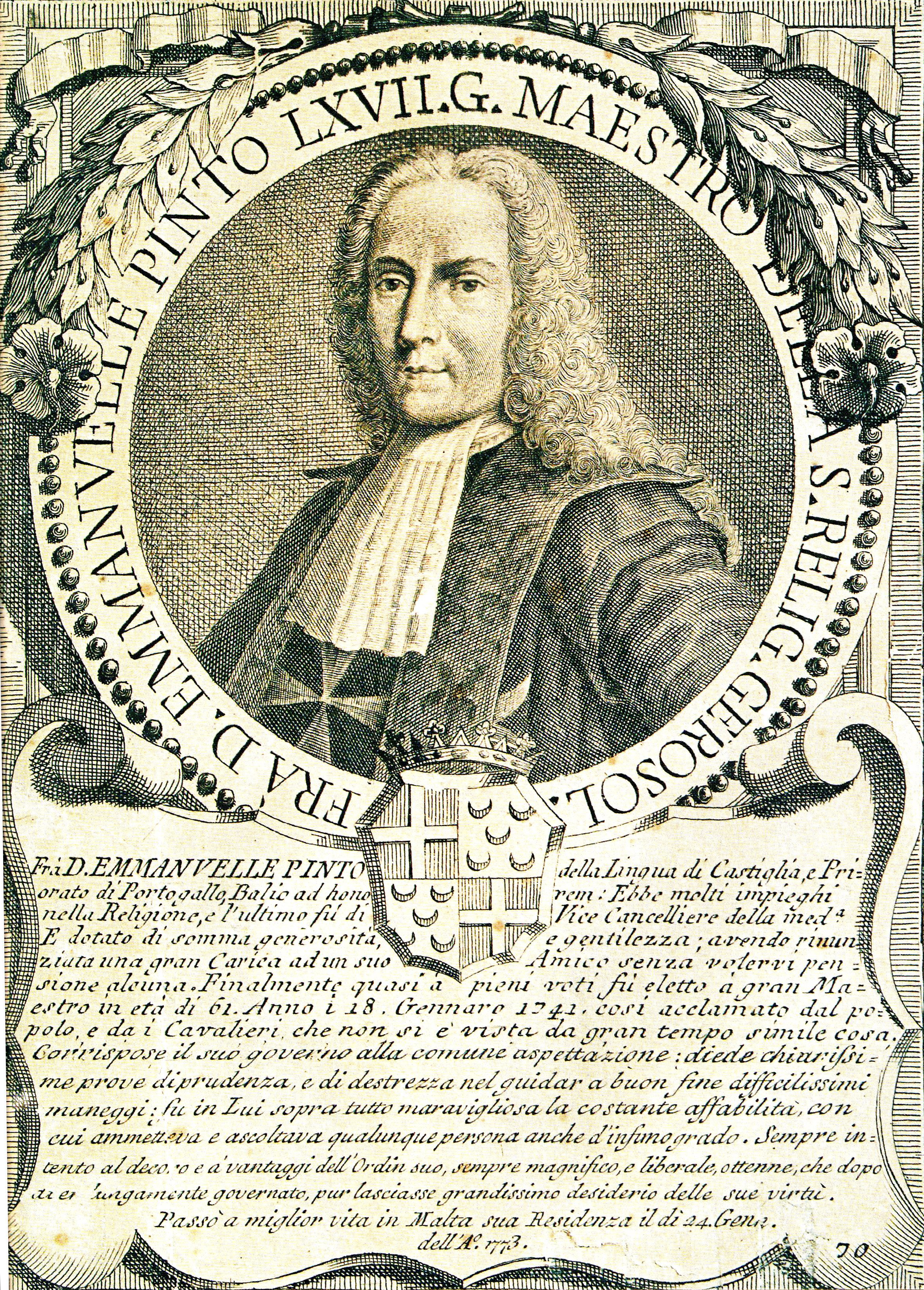
Pinto as 67th Grand Master in Cronologia dei gran maestri dello spedale della sacra religione militare di S. Gio. Gerosolimitano e dall' Ordine del Santo Sepolcro oggi detti di Malta (1776?)

He was the son of Miguel Álvaro Pinto da Fonseca, Alcaide-Mór de Ranhados, and his wife, Ana Pinto Teixeira. The coat of arms of the Pinto portrays five red crescents, to symbolising that the Pinto de Fonseca family won five battles with the Ottomans. Before his election as Grand Master on 18 January 1741, Pinto da Fonseca was a knight of the Langue of Portugal. He had an illegitimate son by one Rosenda Paulichi, daughter of Alberigo Paulichi and Patronilla Ramuzetta, named José António Pinto da Fonseca e Vilhena, who married his first cousin Maria Inácia Pinto da Fonseca de Sousa Teixeira e Vilhena, illegitimate daughter of Francisco Vaz Pinto (his father's brother) by one Clara Cerqueira. He was elected as Grand Master some months before his 60th year, and he lived to be a nonagenarian, ruling the Order for 32 years.

As Grand Master, Pinto da Fonseca kept an elaborate court, imitating the courts of the great European princes of his era. The court was a center of intrigue, the Grand Master being surrounded by a multitude of "ambitious pretenders".

In 1749, one of his bodyguards, Giuseppe Cohen, refused to join a plot led by Pasha Mustafa to stage a Muslim slave revolt; this refusal led to the exposure and suppression of the revolt, which afterward was celebrated each 29 June, the anniversary.

Pinto da Fonseca made substantial donations to the Conventual Church, and among the most notable mementoes are two large and heavy bells cast by the Master Founder of the Order of Saint John, Aloisio Bouchut, in 1747 and 1748; they still hang in the belfries of what is now the Co-Cathedral. These bells were made by melting two basilisks that were left by the Ottomans after the Great Siege of 1565. As Grand Master, Pinto da Fonseca completed construction of the Auberge de Castille (still one of the most important buildings in the Maltese capital city, Valletta); his bust and arms adorn its façade. Today this building houses the Office of the Prime Minister. Pinto built nineteen storehouses at the Marina, which still bear his name, and built several other buildings and structures. In 1756, he has built the first printing press in Malta at the magistral palace of the Grand Master, known as la stamperia del Palazzo. Pinto gave his name to the then town of Qormi and accorded it the status of a city as "Città Pinto". The city of Qormi adopted the Pinto arms, with the tinctures reversed, for its own coat of arms and flag. Pinto gained a bad reputation for creating large debts for the treasury of the Order, leading to bankruptcy.

In 1764, Pinto da Fonseca negotiated with King Frederick II ("Frederick the Great") of Prussia a reunification of the Protestant Bailiwick of Brandenburg with the Catholic Order of Saint John, but as Pope Clement XIII would not allow admission into a Roman Catholic organization of men viewed as heretics by the Church, the agreement came to naught.

In 1765/6, Pinto was befriended by Italian adventurer and occultist Alessandro Cagliostro. A Master Mason of Freemasonry, dom Pinto initiated to the 33rd degree don Raimondo di Sangro, prince of Sansevero, which later established the first Scottish Rite Masonic Lodge in Naples, Italy.

Malta since 1734 was nominally a fief under the House of Bourbon-Two Sicilies, from 1759 under Ferdinand III. Bernardo Tanucci pressured Pinto to follow the Bourbon policy of suppression of the Jesuits, threatening a boycott of Malta if he refused. Pinto consulted with Pope Clement XIII, who reluctantly agreed to the expulsion of the Jesuits from Malta, insisting that it should be done "with due decency". Pinto signed the decree of expulsion on 22 April 1768. Twenty Jesuits (thirteen fathers, five brothers and two students) were expelled, while three elderly Jesuits, two of them native Maltese, were allowed to remain.

After the expulsion of the Jesuit Order, Pinto appropriated all the revenue accruing from its property on the island with the aim of establishing a Pubblica Università di Studi Generali. The decree constituting the university, now the University of Malta was signed by Pinto on 22 November 1769, having been authorised to do so by the Papal brief, Sedula Romani Pontificis, received on 20 October 1769. By 22 November of that year, the Grandmaster signed a bando establishing the university.

Pinto died on 23 January 1773, aged 91. His body was laid in a neoclassic monument with his mosaic portrait. A statue of Pinto is found in Floriana.

== Gallery ==
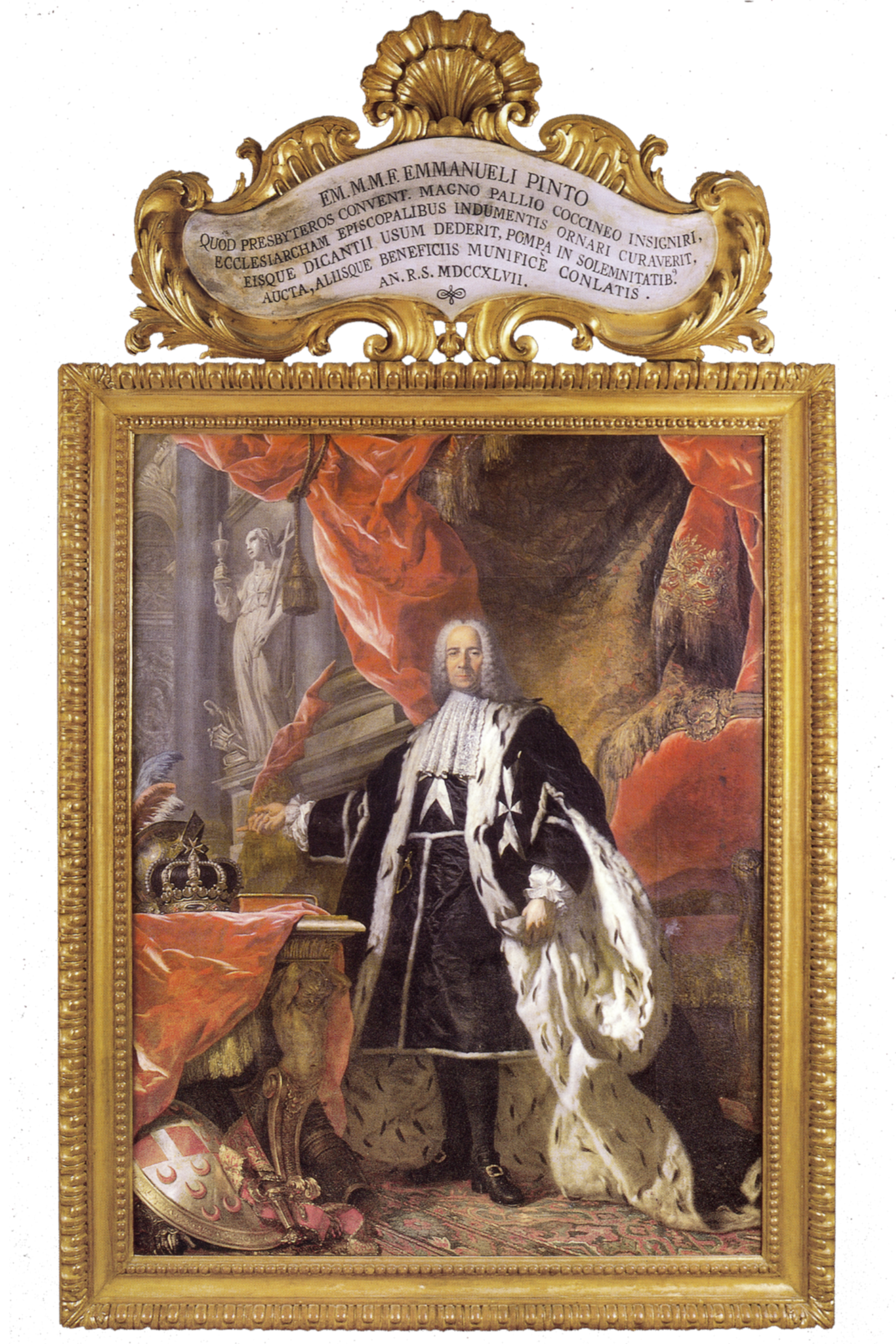
Portrait by Antoine de Favray, now in the museum of St. John's Co-Cathedral

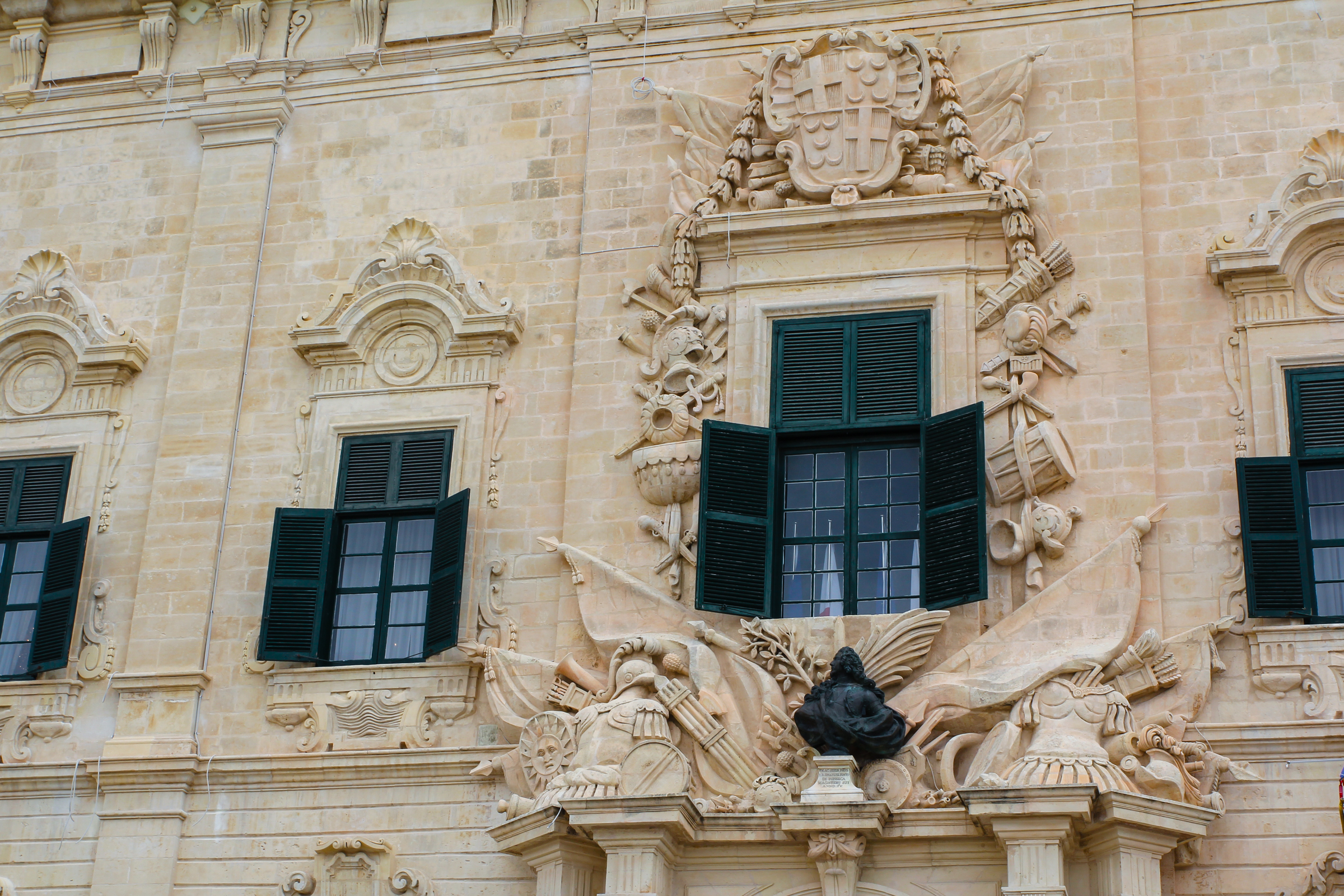
Part of the façade of Auberge de Castille (1741–45), showing Pinto's bust and coat of arms

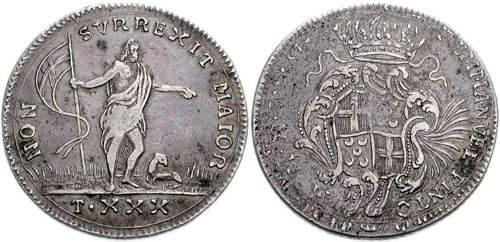
30 tarì coin minted in 1757

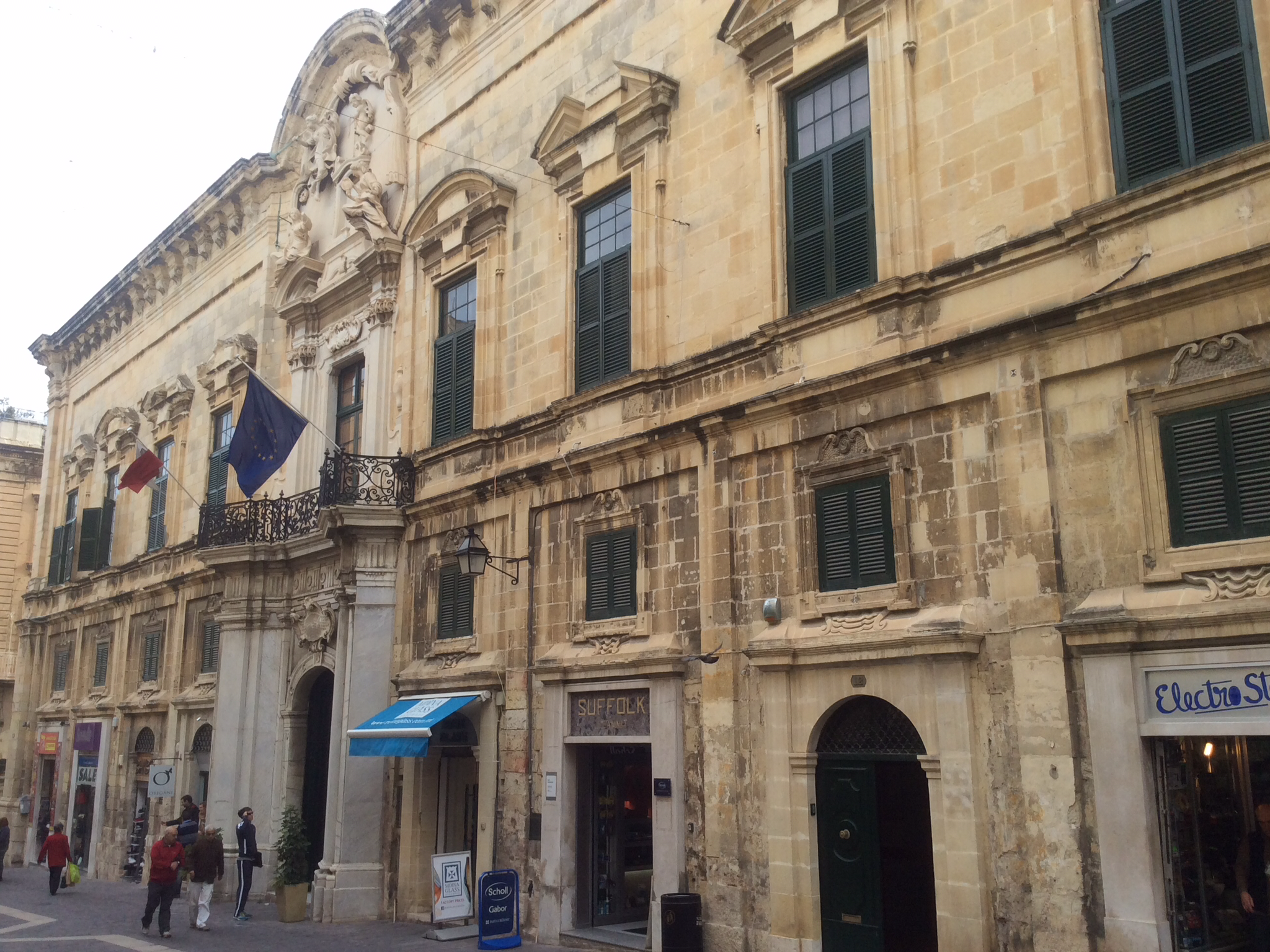
The Castellania (1757–60), built during Pinto's magistracy

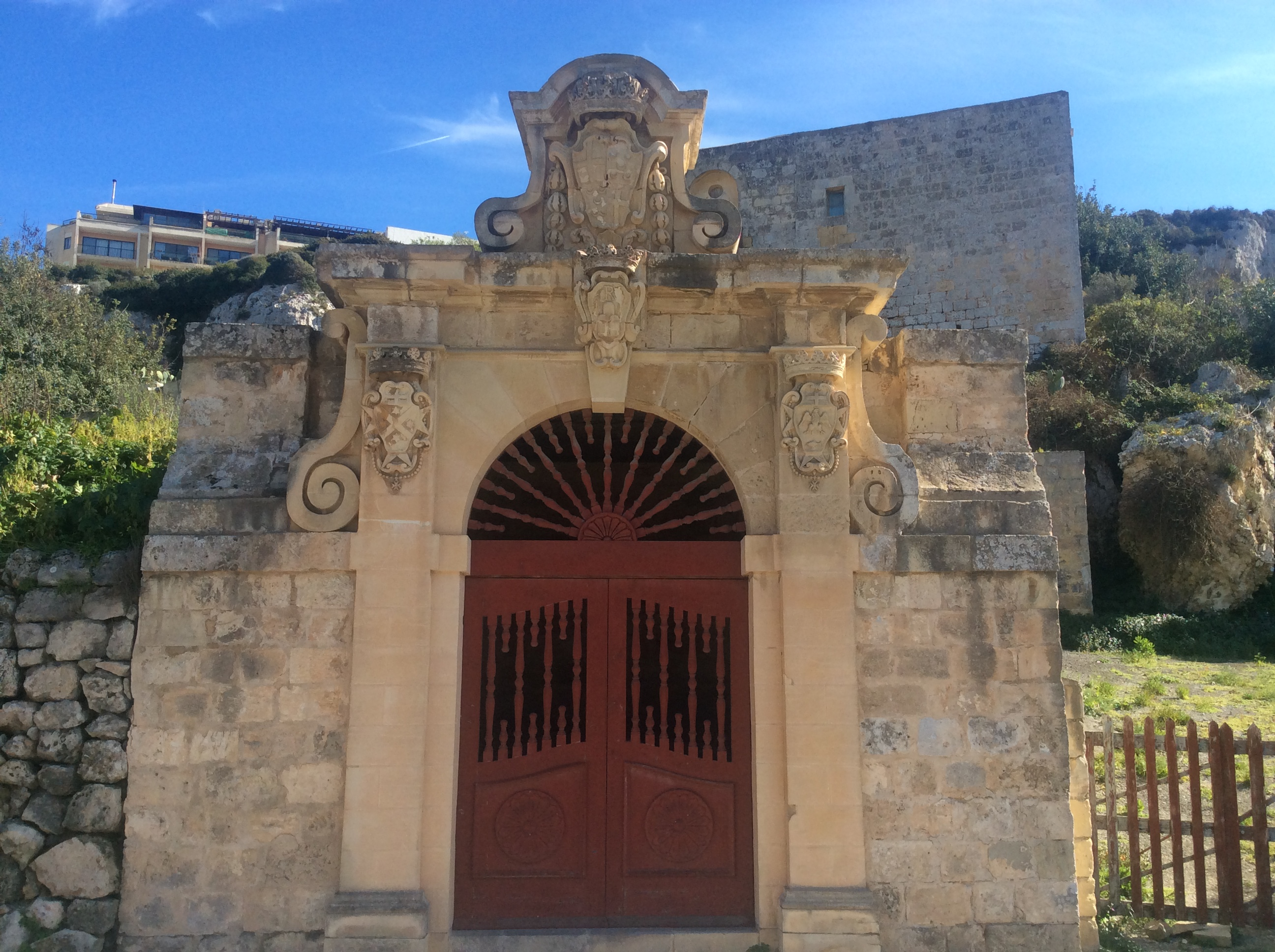
Mistra Gate (1760), containing Pinto's coat of arms

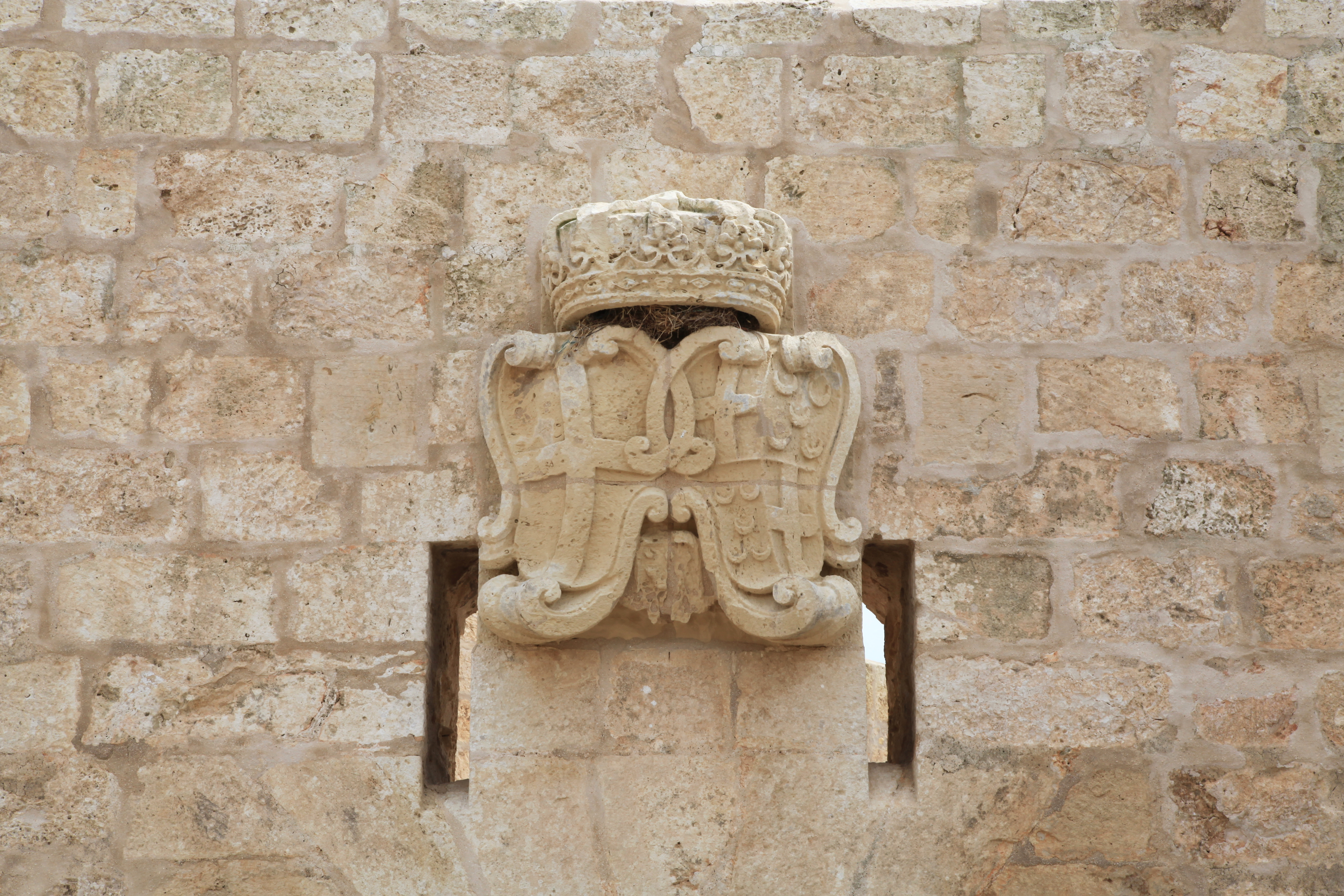
Coat of arms of Pinto and the Order on Mistra Battery (c. 1761)

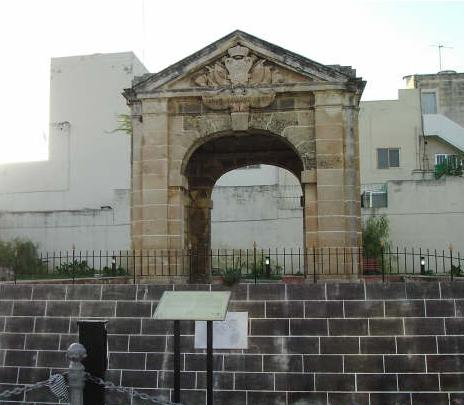
Pinto's Loggia in Qormi (1772)

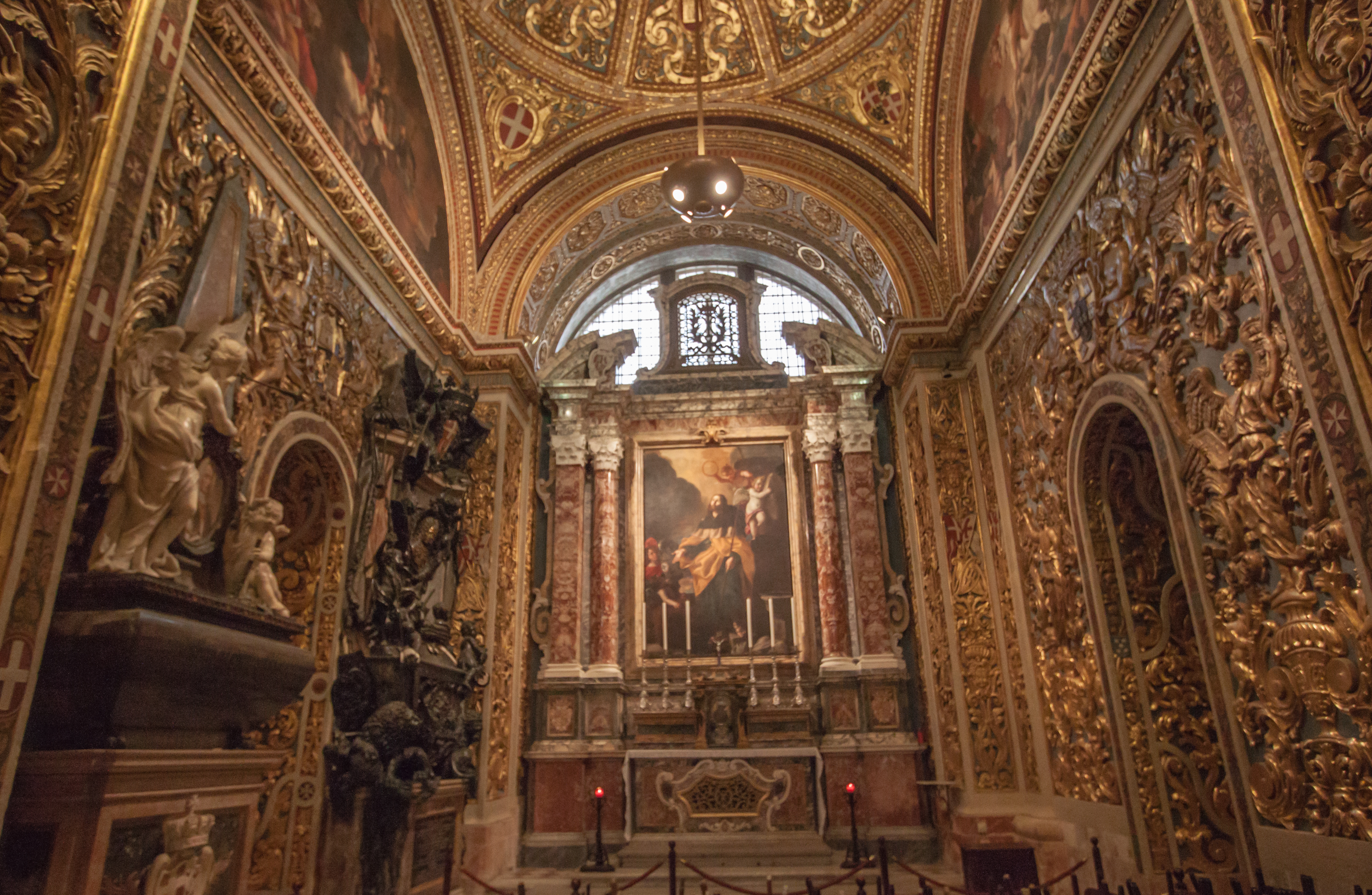
Chapel of the Langue of Castile, Leon and Portugal in St. John's Co-Cathedral, with Pinto's funerary monument visible on the left

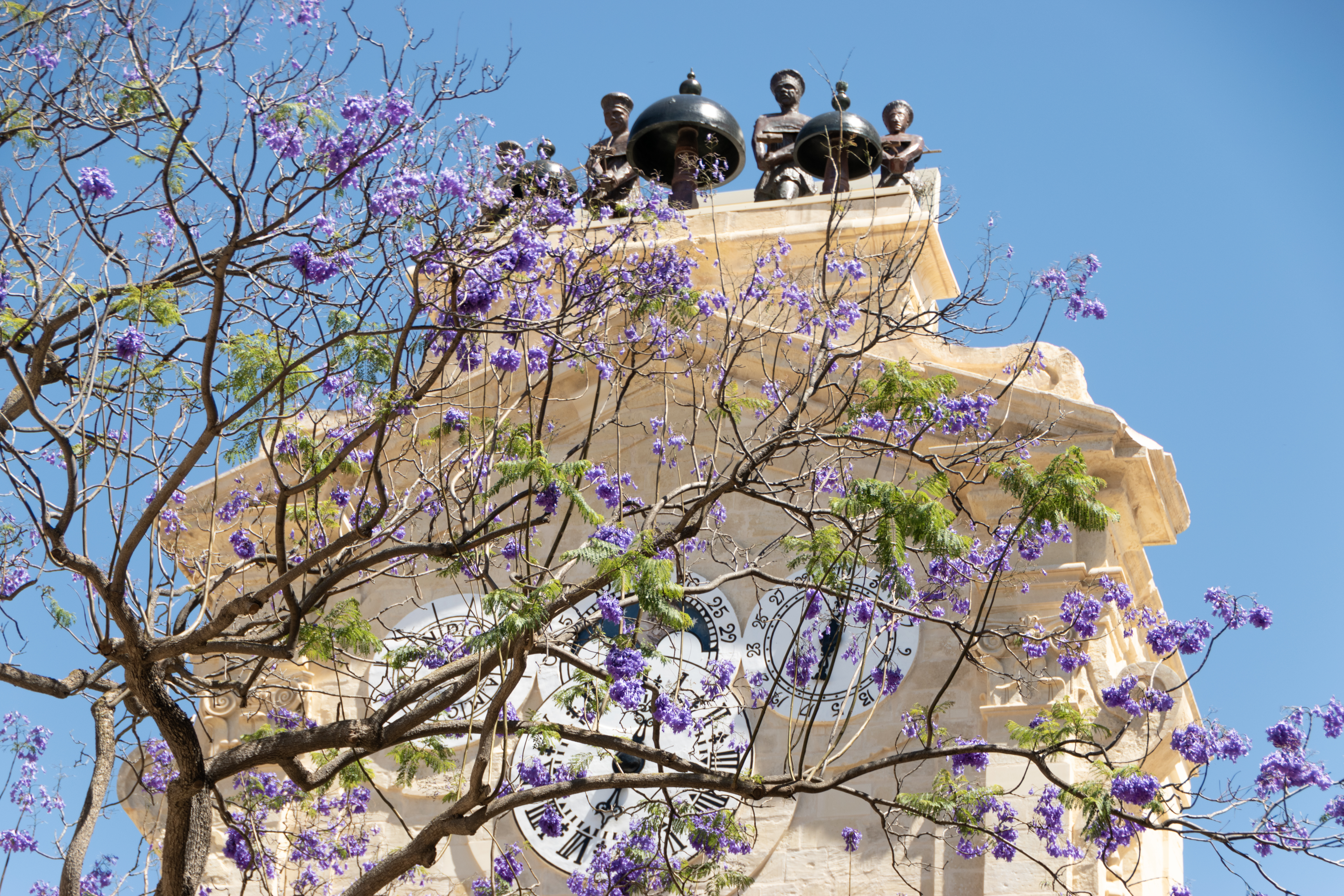
Clocktower inside Prince Alfred's Courtyard, commissioned by Pinto in 1745

Preceded by Ramon Despuig	Grand Master of the Knights Hospitaller; 1741–1773	Succeeded by Francisco Ximénez de Tejada
