= Navy of the Order of Saint John =

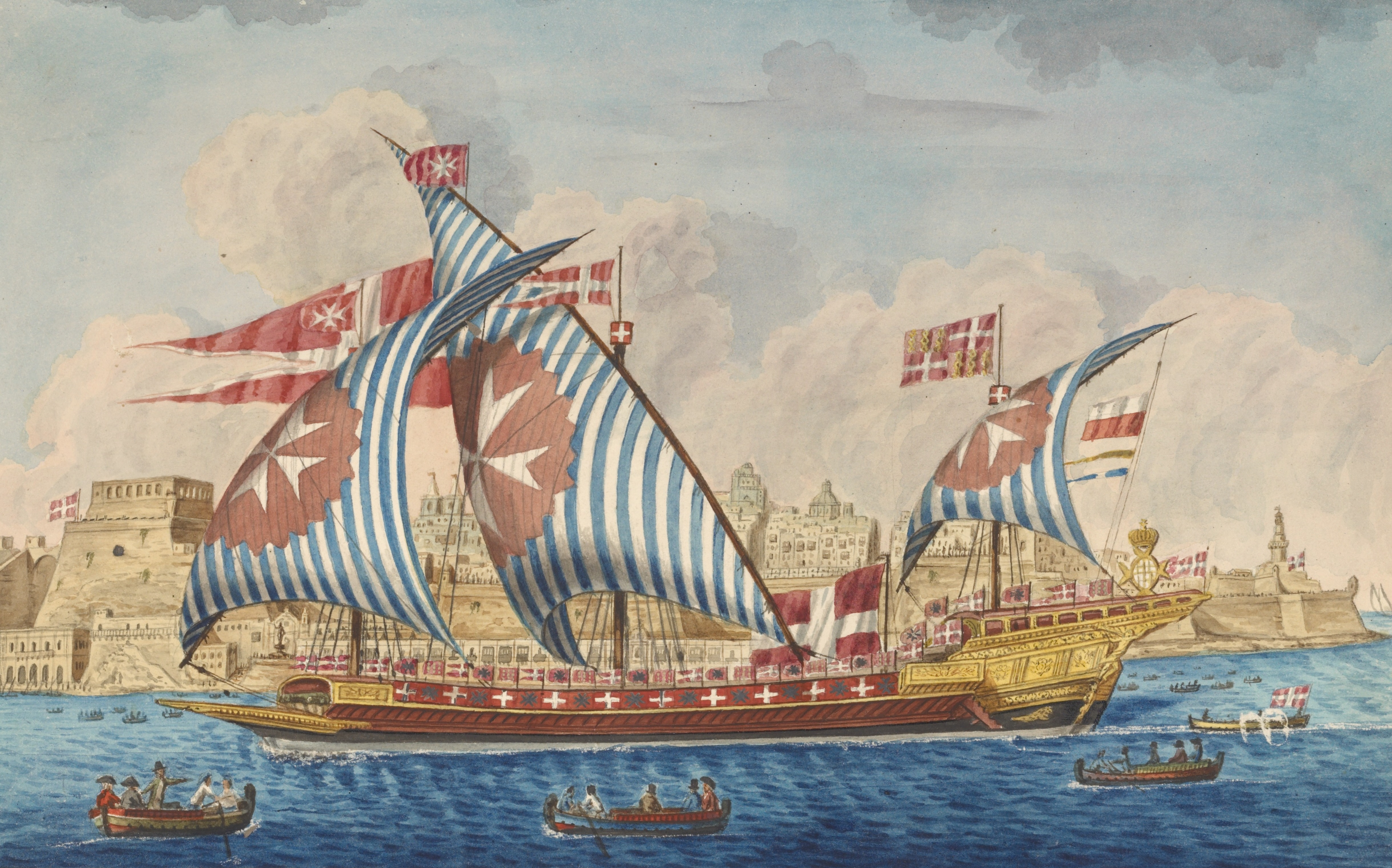
- Late 18th-century illustration of a galley of the navy of the Order of Saint John entering Valletta's Grand Harbour
- Active: 12th century–1798
- Country: (Sovereign Military Order of Malta) Knights Hospitaller
- Branch: Navy
- Base: Rhodes (1309–1522); Birgu (1530–1571); Valletta (1571–1798)
- Engagements: Battle of Chios (1319); Conquest of Coron (1532); Conquest of Tunis (1535); Battle of Preveza (1538); Algiers expedition (1541); Battle of Djerba (1560); Battle of Lepanto (1571); Skirmish at Cerigo Channel (1572); Action of 28 September 1644; Battle of the Dardanelles (1656); Battle of the Dardanelles (1657); Battle of Matapan (1717); Bombardment of Algiers (1784); French invasion of Malta (1798) and various other battles

Insignia
- Flag

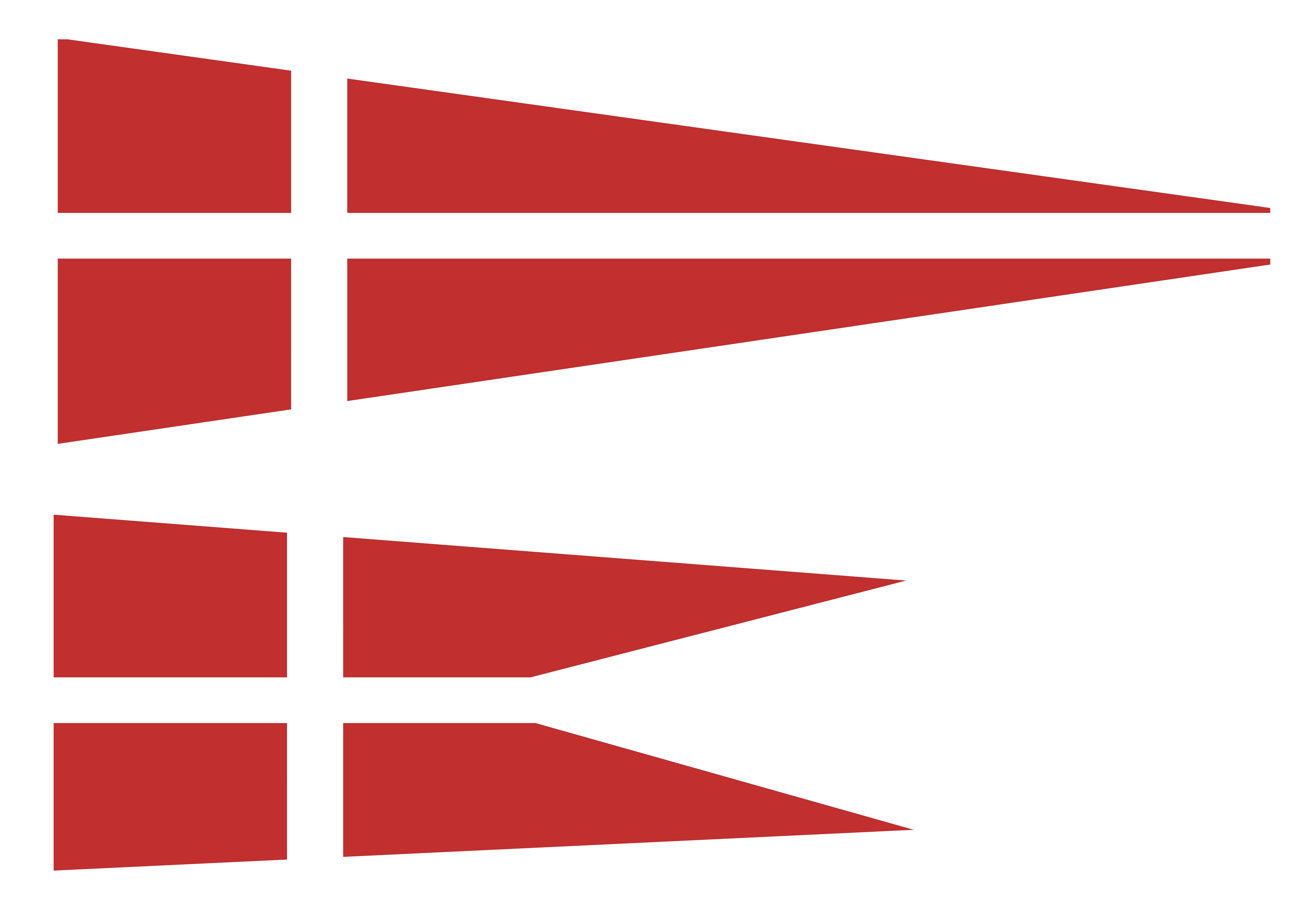
- Variants

The navy of the Order of Saint John, also known as the Maltese Navy, was the navy of the Knights Hospitaller. Established in the Middle Ages during the 12th century, it moved to Hospitaller Malta in 1530 and reached its peak in the 1680s under the direction of Grand Master Gregorio Carafa.

The navy won especial renown during the wars against the Ottoman Empire in the 16th century, often acting in cooperation with the Spanish navy. It was dedicated to protect Christian shipping from Barbary corsairs, as well as to engage in their own privateering activities against Muslim nations, the Maltese Corso. The navy was disbanded following the French invasion of Malta in 1798, and its ships were incorporated into the French Navy.

== History ==
=== Middle Ages ===
The Knights Hospitaller were established in around 1099 to take care of pilgrims in the Holy Land. The Order was sanctioned by a papal bull in 1113, and eventually its role changed to include the defence of pilgrims as well. By the mid-12th century, the Order had purchased its first transport ships. Eventually, it began building its own ships, and had a shipyard in Acre. In the 1280s, the Order sent some ships to support the Aragonese Crusade.

Following the loss of Acre in 1291, the Hospitallers moved to Cyprus. Pope Nicholas IV encouraged the Hospitallers and other military orders such as the Knights Templar to build their own fleets, in order to enforce an embargo on Egypt. In December 1291, the Pope demanded that half of the Order's income in Europe was to be used to build up the fleet, and in January 1292, the Pope authorised the Order to use their new galleys to defend the Armenian Kingdom of Cilicia.

The first reference to an admiral of the Hospitaller fleet dates back to 1299. By 1306, the Order had drastically adapted to naval warfare, and it was beginning to become a maritime power.

=== Rhodes ===
The Order captured the island of Rhodes from the Byzantine Empire in 1309, and subsequently established its base there. Since the Order was now based on an island, its navy became an essential component for defence.

The Hospitallers fought several naval battles in the Aegean Sea during this period, such as the Battle of Chios in 1319, and supported operations with other crusader navies, such as at Euboea in 1344.

In 1478, the Order started fielding a carrack or galleon, officially called the "Great Carrack", as the order's flagship to complement its galleys. The ship would be used to carry supplies, allowing to extend the galleys' autonomy, and for heavy combat, capitalizing on its size and artillery. The first notable Great Carrack was the San Juan Baptista. In 1507, however, the ship helped capture an even more impressive vessel, a Mamluk carrack named Mogarbina, which was renamed Santa Maria.

The Order had an important victory in 1510. A squad under Philippe Villiers de L'Isle-Adam and Andrea d'Amaral routed a far superior Mamluk fleet in Laiazzo, after which they launched an operation in Alexandretta, where they destroyed an Ottoman-Mamluk attempt to collect timber to build a fleet in the Red Sea. The Mamluks intended to use this fleet to attack the Portuguese India.

In 1522 the order build an even more ambitious carrack, the Santa Anna, a two-deck carrack with a rudimentary ironclad armor. For a time it was regarded as the most powerful sailing ship in the Mediterranean.

=== Malta ===
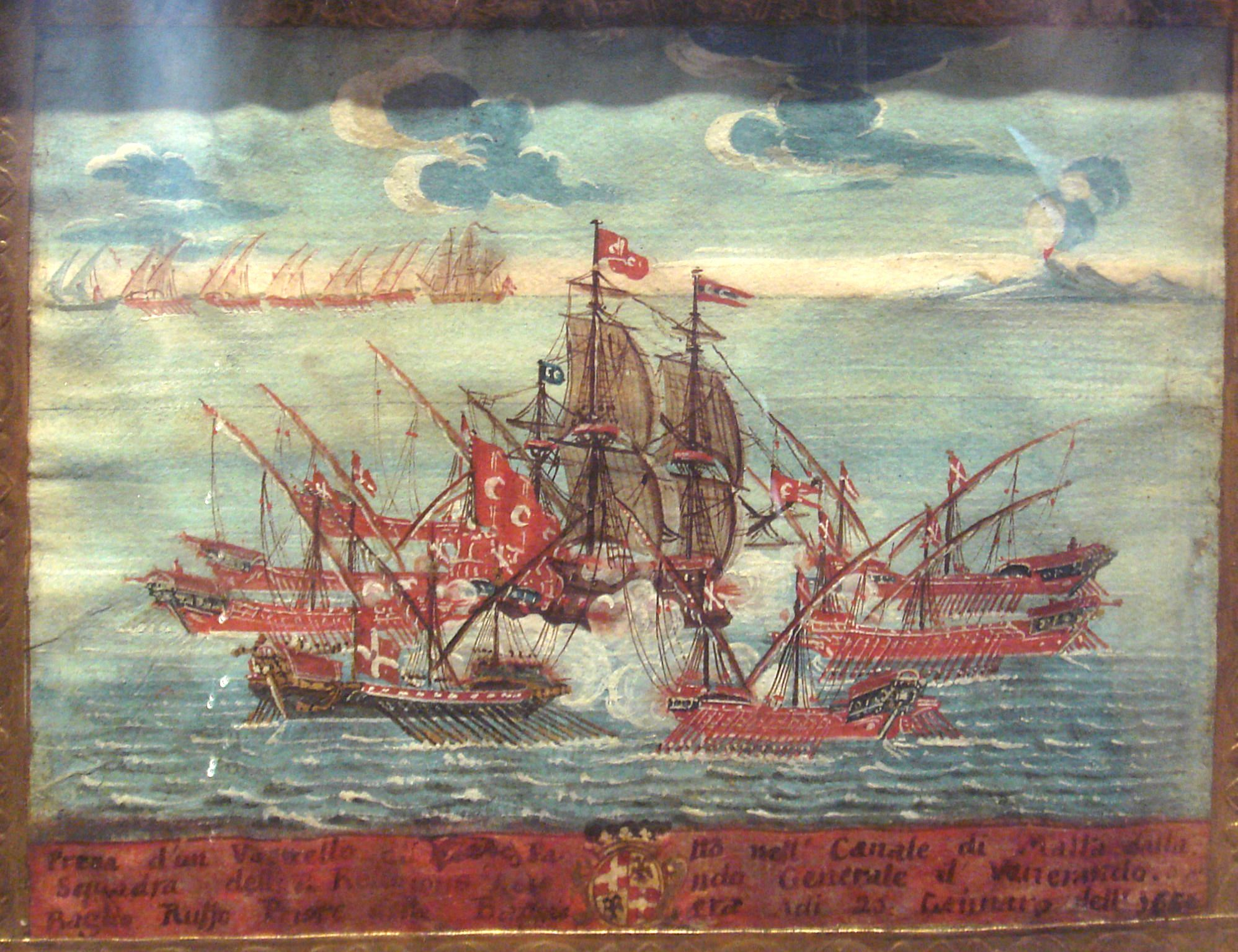
A painting showing Maltese galleys capturing an Ottoman vessel in the Malta Channel in 1652.

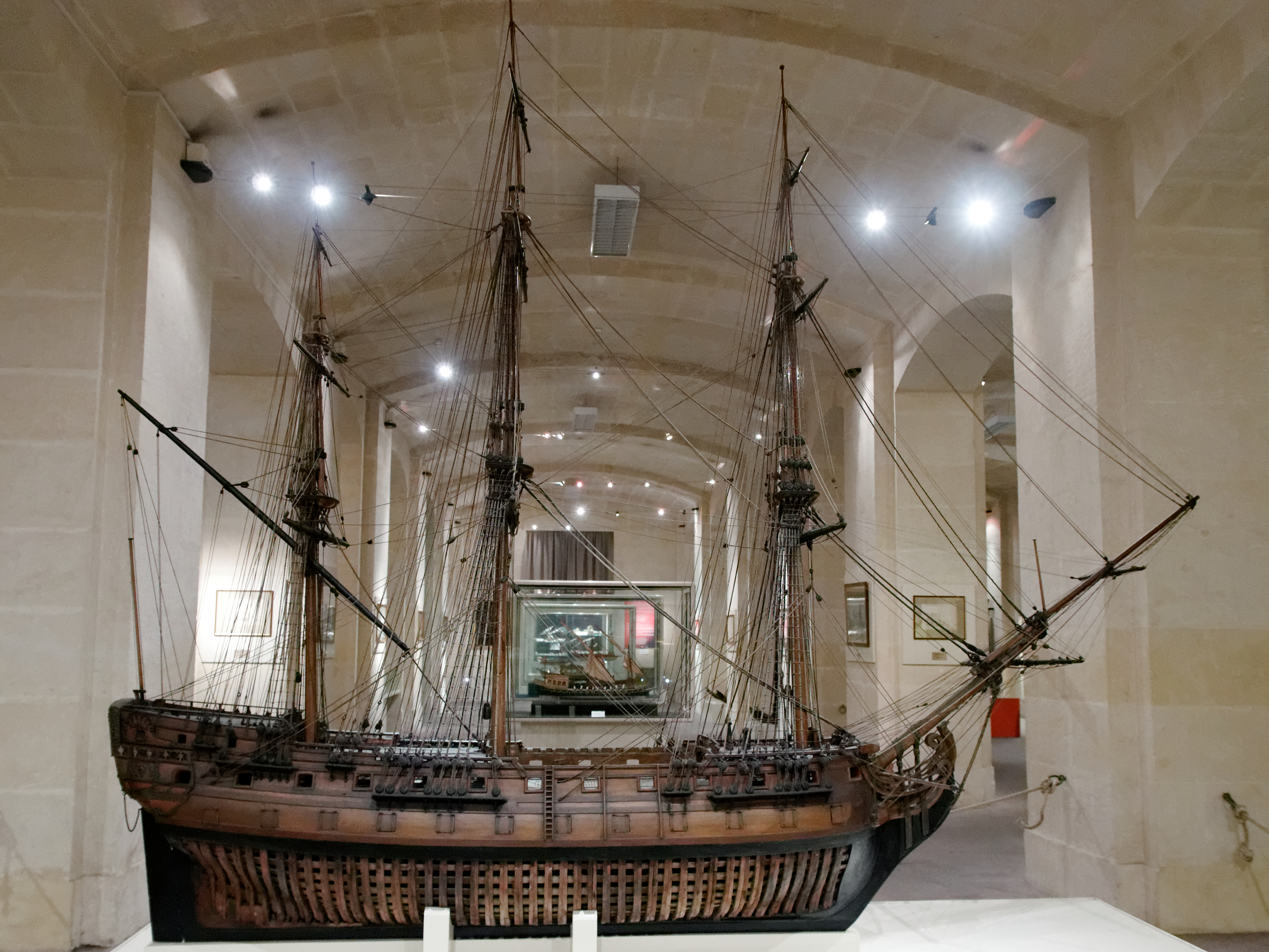
Model of a Maltese ship of the line at the Malta Maritime Museum

The Order lost Rhodes to the Ottoman Empire after a six-month long siege in 1522. After a couple of years of moving from place to place in Europe, Emperor Charles V offered the Order possession of the islands of Malta and Gozo, and the port of Tripoli. The Order arrived in Malta on 26 October 1530 on a number of ships, including the San Giovanni, Santa Croce, San Filippo, and the flagship Santa Anna.

While based in Malta, the Order and its navy participated in a number of naval battles against the Ottoman Navy or the Barbary pirates. In 1531, the Santa Anna alone routed the galley fleet of Hayreddin Barbarossa.

The Order sent carracks and galleys to support the Spanish Empire and its allies in the conquest and relief of Coron (1532-1533) and the conquest of Tunis in 1535. It also participated in victories like Battle of Antipaxos (1537) and defeats like Battle of Preveza (1538), the Algiers expedition (1541) and Battle of Djerba (1560).

Four of the Order's galleys, Santa Fè, San Michele, San Filippo and San Claudio, capsized in a tornado in the Grand Harbour in 1555. They were replaced with funds sent from Spain, the Papal States, France and the Prior of St. Giles. One galley was built at the expense of Grand Master Claude de la Sengle. In 1540, the Santa Anna was dismantled due to her expensive mantaining.

When the city of Valletta began to be built in the 1560s, there were plans to build an arsenal and mandracchio for the Order's navy. The arsenal was never built, and while work started on the mandracchio, it stopped and the area became a slum known as the Manderaggio. Eventually, an arsenal was built in Birgu in 1597. A dock was built in Valletta's ditch in 1654, but it closed in 1685.

Three of the Order's ships participated in the Battle of Lepanto of 1571, which was a decisive victory for the Holy League. They also participated in the subsequent skirmish at Cerigo Channel against the rebuilt Ottoman fleet. Ottoman power in the Mediterranean began to wane after this point, and eventually the Order began to sanction corsairing against Muslim ships travelling near North Africa and the Levant. The Order again teamed up with Spain in battles like the raid on the Kerkennah Islands (1611) and the Battle of the Gulf of Tunis (1624).

In 1617, the Order built a new Great Carrack, the Gran Galeone, ordered in Amsterdam. It was the last of its kind, however, as the Order stopped fielding sailing ships in 1645. It is believed this was due to the War of Candia, which allowed the Order access to Venetian ports against the Ottomans, thus making unnecessary to maintain supply ships.

A notable engagement in the war was the action of 28 September 1644, which led to the outbreak of the Cretan War. The navy reached its peak in the 1680s, during the magistracy of Gregorio Carafa. At this point, the dockyard in Birgu was enlarged.

The Order's navy and dockyard began to decline after around 1740, as part of the decline of the Order itself. Its last engagement was in the French invasion of Malta in 1798. On 10 June, a galley, two galleots and a chaloup sailed out of the Grand Harbour and made an unsuccessful attack against French forces landing at St. Julian's Bay and St. George's Bay.

Following the Order's capitulation on 12 June 1798, all its ships were all taken over by the French. The ships of the line San Zaccharia and San Giovanni and the frigate Sante Elisabeth were commissioned into the French Navy and were renamed Dégo, Athénien, and Carthaginoise. All three ships remained in Malta during the siege of Malta, and surrendered to the British in 1800. The British broke up Dégo and Carthaginoise, but commissioned Athénien into the Royal Navy as HMS Athenienne, which was wrecked off Sicily in 1806.

== Ships ==
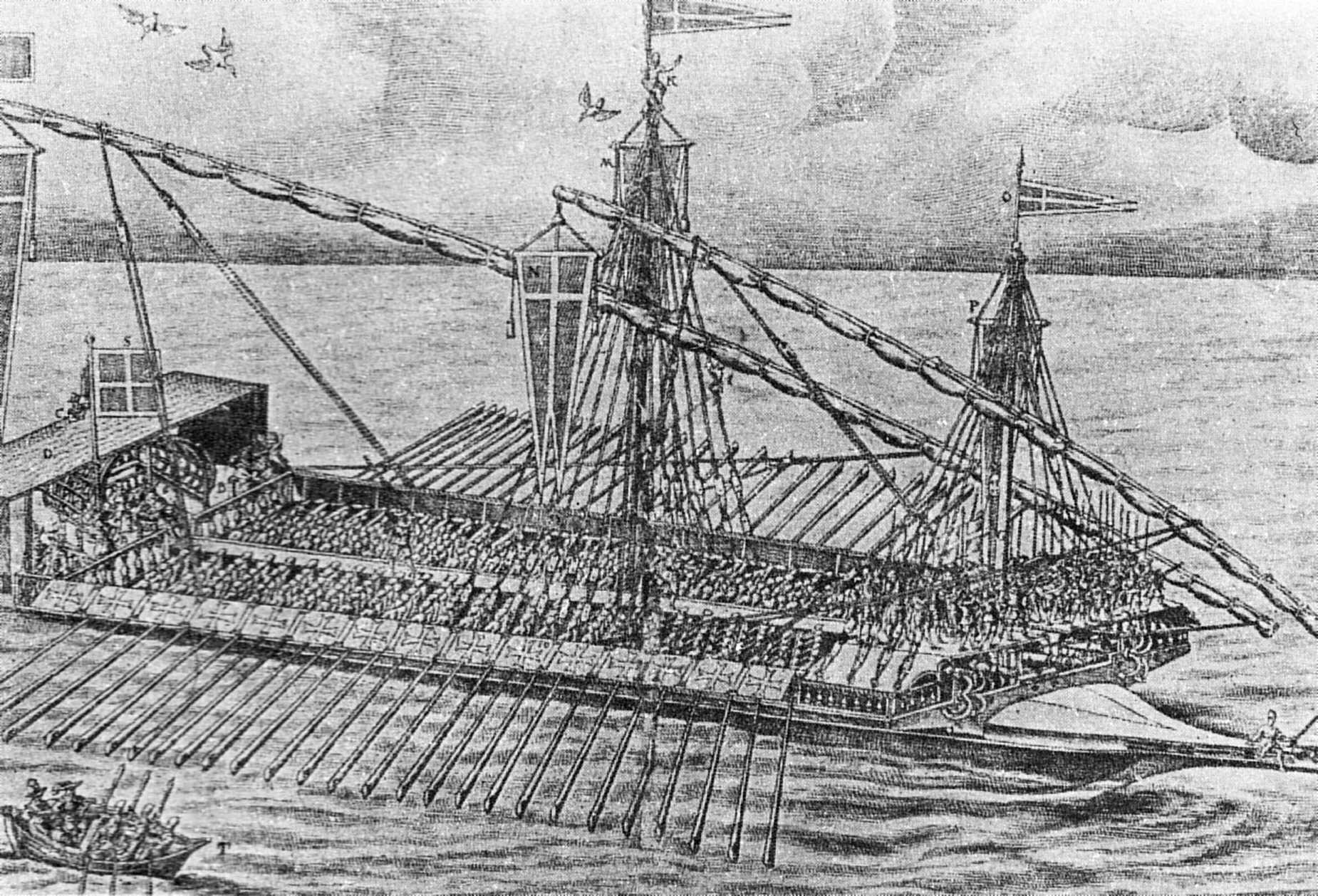
17th century Maltese galley

The Order's navy had a number of different types of ships over the centuries. Until the 17th century, the navy consisted mainly of galleys, which came in several sizes. At times, the navy also included galleons, carracks, frigates or xebecs.

The Grand Master also had a ceremonial barge, which was used for special occasions.

During the 18th century, the Order's navy also had a few ships of the line.

== See also ==
- Maritime Squadron of the Armed Forces of Malta, the present-day Maltese navy

== Bibliography ==
- Sire, H. J. A. (1994). The Knights of Malta. Yale University Press. ISBN 9780300068856.
