= List of ships of the line of the Order of Saint John =

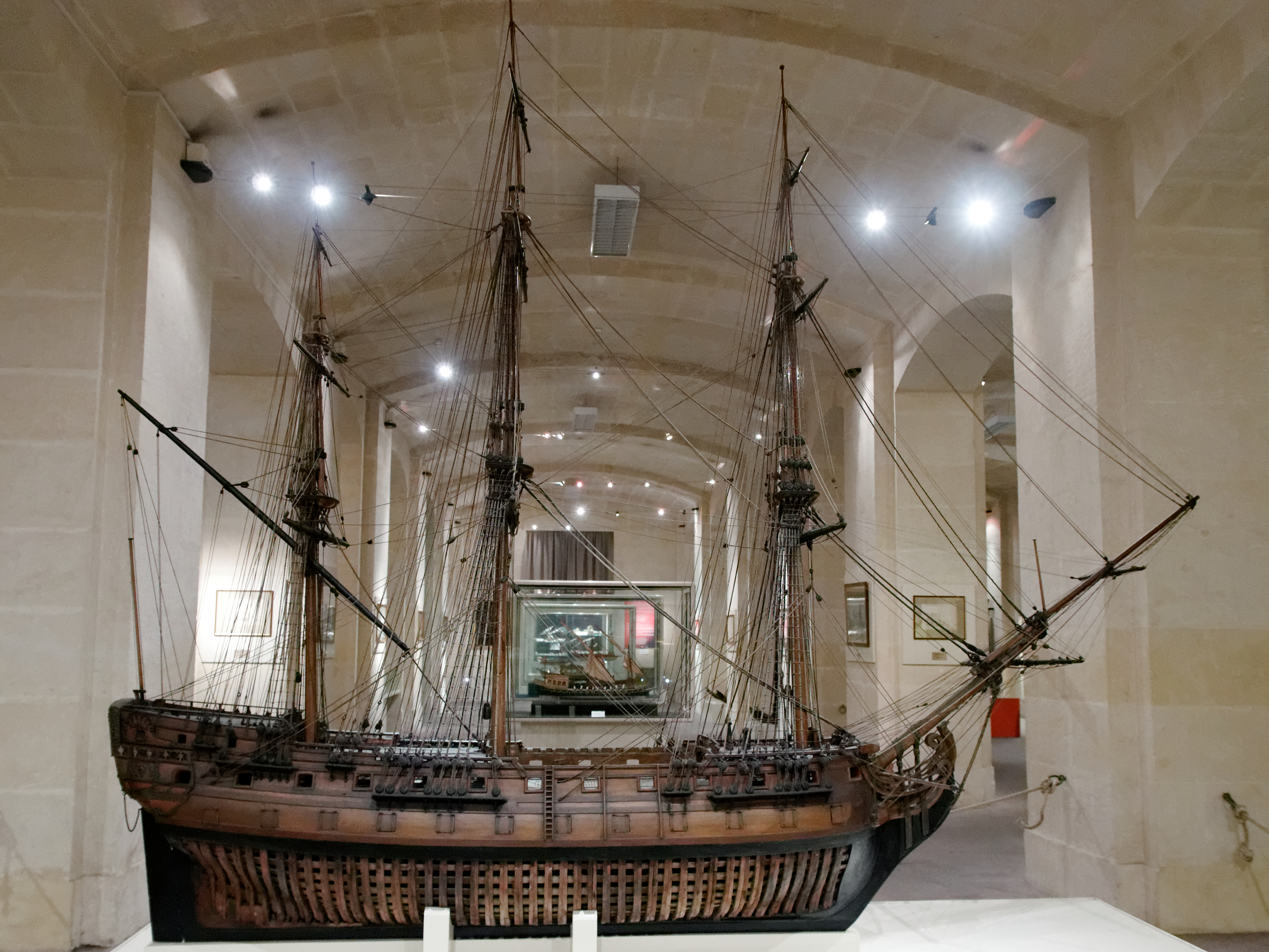
Model of a Maltese ship of the line at the Malta Maritime Museum

Malta was ruled by the Order of Saint John as a vassal state of the Kingdom of Sicily from 1530 to 1798. The islands of Malta and Gozo, as well as the city of Tripoli in modern Libya, were granted to the order by Spanish Emperor Charles V in 1530, following the loss of Rhodes. The Ottoman Empire managed to capture Tripoli from the Order in 1551, but an attempt to take Malta in 1565 failed.

The Maltese navy was small but competent and was constantly involved in naval warfare since its inception. Their greatest achievement came during the Great Siege of Malta of 1565. Their independence (and fleet) lasted until 12 June 1798, when Napoleon Bonaparte, during his campaign against the Ottoman Empire, captured Malta with little bloodshed, along with the entire remaining Maltese navy. All remaining Maltese ships were added to the French Navy. Some of these ships were later taken into service by the Royal Navy when the British captured Malta from France in 1800.

== Ship list ==
Ship name	Year constructed	Year of decommissioning
Santa Anna	1522	Decommissioned in 1540
Beneghem	Some time before 1654	Some time after 1700
San Giovanni	1703	Some time after 1703
San Giacomo	1703	Some time after 1703
Santa Croce	Some time before 1706	Some time after 1706
Half Moon	Some time before 1713	Some time after 1713
San Giovanni	1718	Broken up in 1753
San Giorgio	1719	Some time after 1719
San Vicenzo	1720	Some time after 1720
San Antonio di Padova	1727	Broken up in 1765
San Vicenzo	1755	Some time after 1720
San Giovanni	1720	Broken up in 1765
San Salvatore	Some time before 1760	Some time after 1762
San Zaccaria	1765	Broken up in 1803
San Giovanni	1768	Some time after 1784
San Giocomo	1769	Some time after 1784
San Giovanni	1796	Wrecked, 1806

== Bibliography ==
- Winfield, Rif & Roberts, Stephen S. (2015) French Warships in the Age of Sail 1786-1861: Design, Construction, Careers and Fates. Barnsley, UK: Seaforth Publishing. ISBN 978-1-84832-204-2
