= French ship Dégo =

Two ships of the French Navy have borne the name Dégo:

- French ship Dégo (1797), a gunboat taken from the Venetian navy
- French ship Dégo (1798), a 64-gun ship of the line taken from the Maltese Navy
