= Lazzaretto of Ancona =

Historic building in Ancona, Italy

Coordinates: 43°36′52″N 13°30′13″E

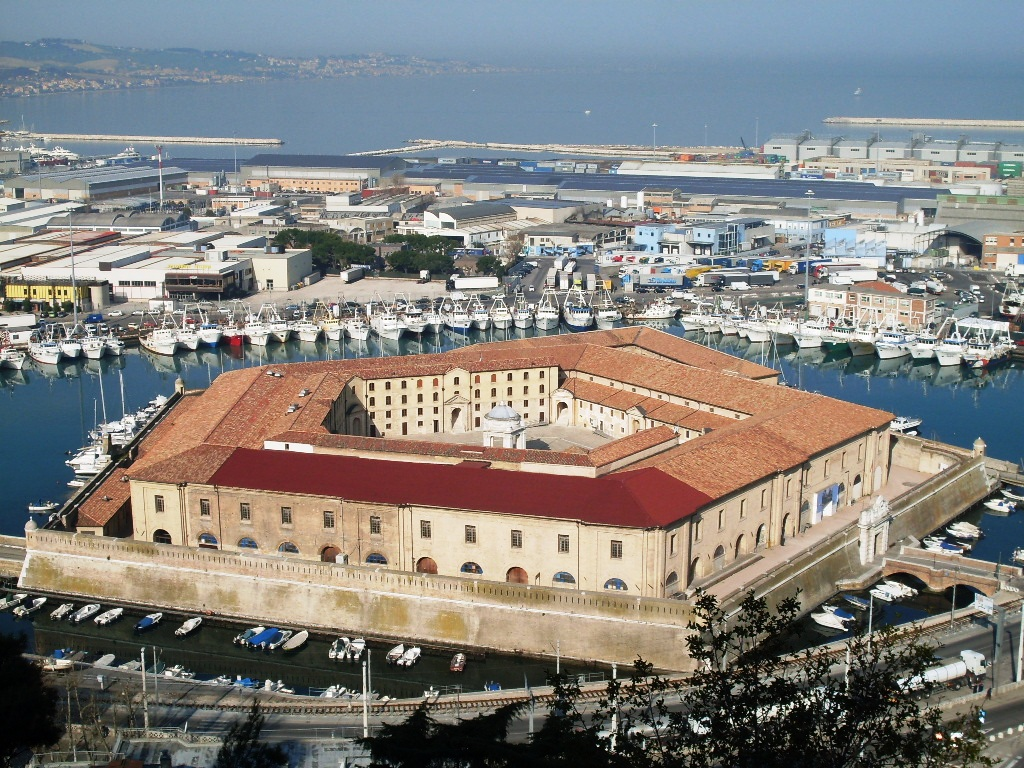
The Lazzaretto during renovation

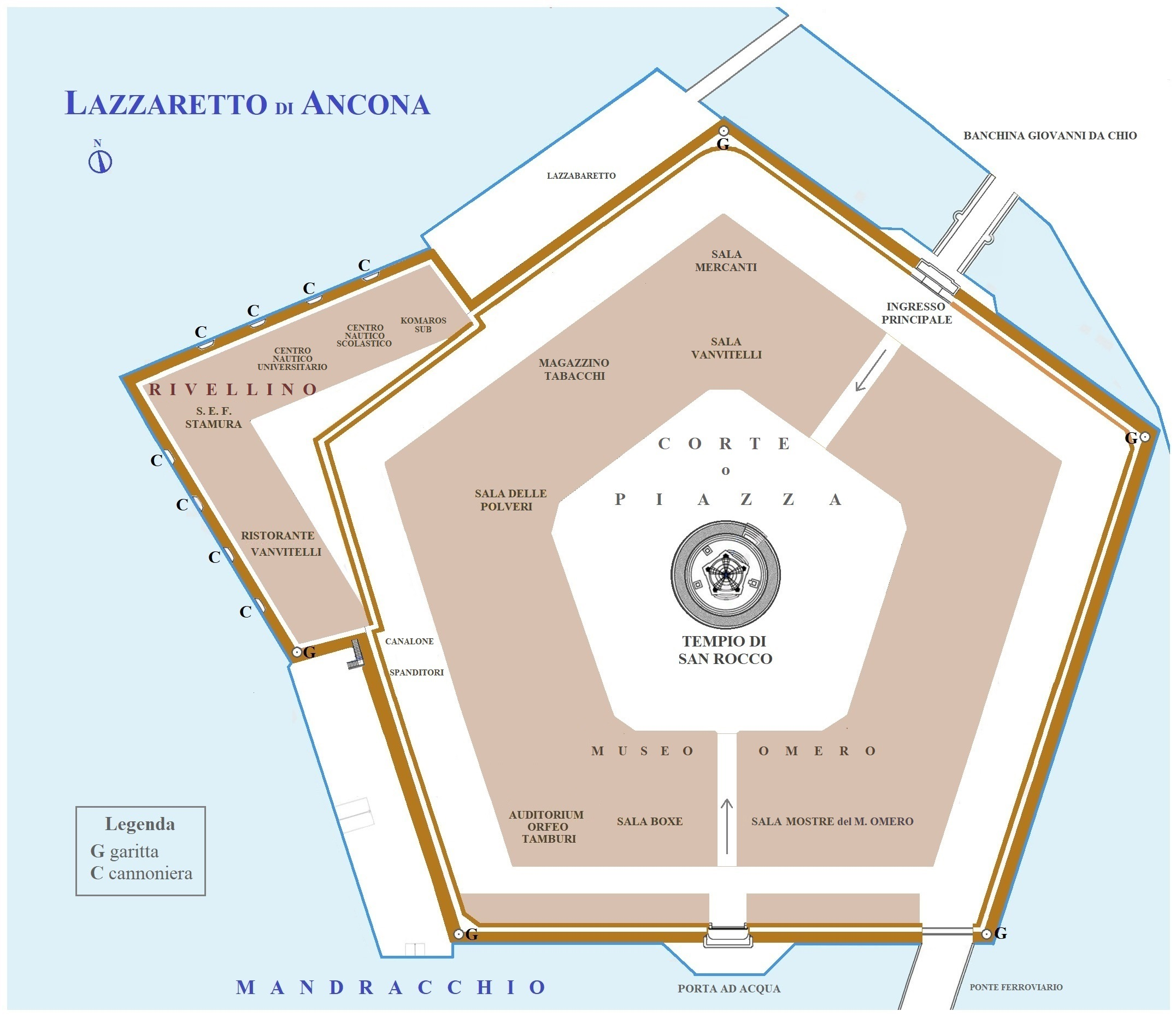
Plan of the Lazzaretto

The Lazzaretto of Ancona, also called the Mole Vanvitelliana, is a pentagonal 18th-century building built on an artificial island as a quarantine station for the port town of Ancona, Italy.

In 1732, Pope Clement XII commissioned Luigi Vanvitelli to build the Lazzaretto. Vanvitelli designed it in the shape of a regular pentagon, which is the shape that characterizes the entire structure, from the surrounding walls to the buildings and the central square.

It is now a cultural centre and houses art exhibitions, a tactile museum (Museo Omero) and an auditorium.

== History ==
Pope Clement XII, as part of his enlightened policy of promoting the well-being of his subjects through economic development, decided to revitalize the port of Ancona, which was then in deep crisis due to the neglect of previous pontiffs. To achieve this goal, in 1732 he granted the city free port status and commissioned architect Luigi Vanvitelli to redesign the port of Ancona.

Vanvitelli chose a regular pentagonal shape for the building, a shape rich in symbolic meaning that characterizes the entire monument: the surrounding wall, the buildings, the central square, and the temple that stands within it. The pentagon is grafted onto a ravelin facing the open sea, serving a military purpose.

The island is separated from the land by a channel called "Mandracchio". It originally didn't have a link to the mainland. It is now connected to the mainland by three bridges. A well is located in the central Neoclassical temple dedicated to Saint Roch, invoking against the plague, in the center of the courtyard. It was built to house possibly infected travellers and goods arriving in the port, who had to remain there forty days.

Over the years, the site has taken on different functions; in 1860 as a military citadel, then in 1884 a sugar refinery. During World War I, there was a failed attempt to sabotage the Italian naval resources by 60 infiltrating Habsburg sailors. Now it is used as a site of the Tactile museum Omero, as well as home for various exhibitions.

== Symbolism ==
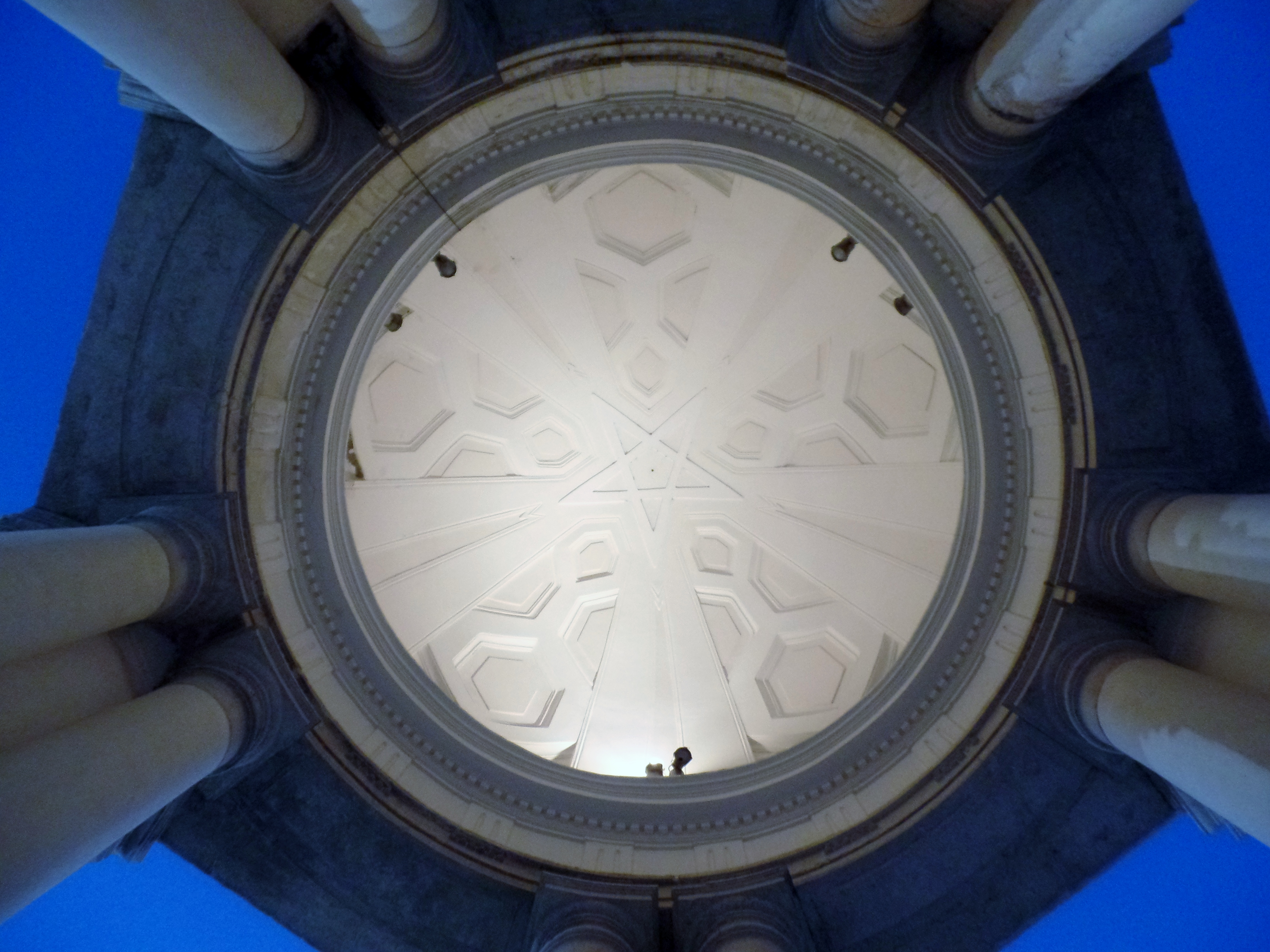
Interior of the dome of the Temple of Saint Roch, with the central star (a pentalpha) at the centre of the vault

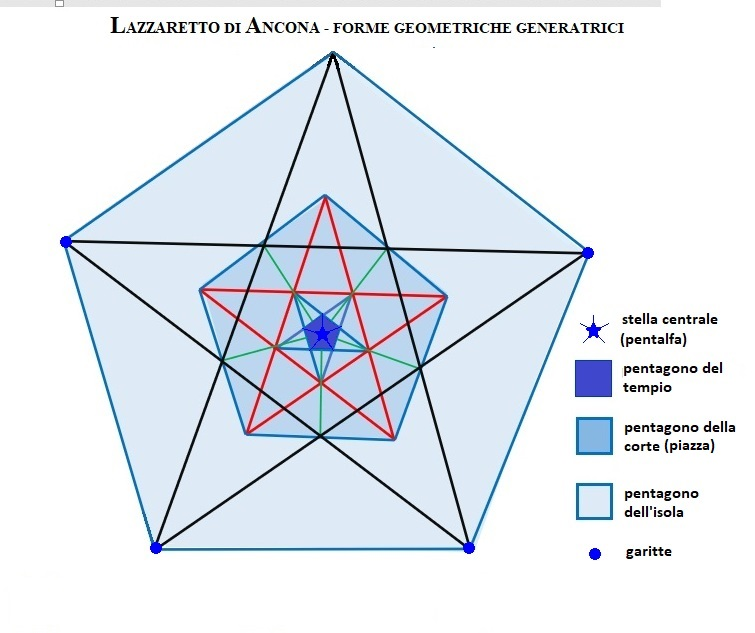
All the geometries and proportions of the Lazzaretto are generated by the pentalpha symbol reproduced at the center of the vault of the dome of the Temple of Saint Roch. In particular, the following shapes derive geometrically from the central star: the pentagon of the Temple of Saint Roch; the pentagon of the water cistern located under the courtyard; the pentagon of the courtyard itself; the artificial pentagonal island on which the Lazzaretto.

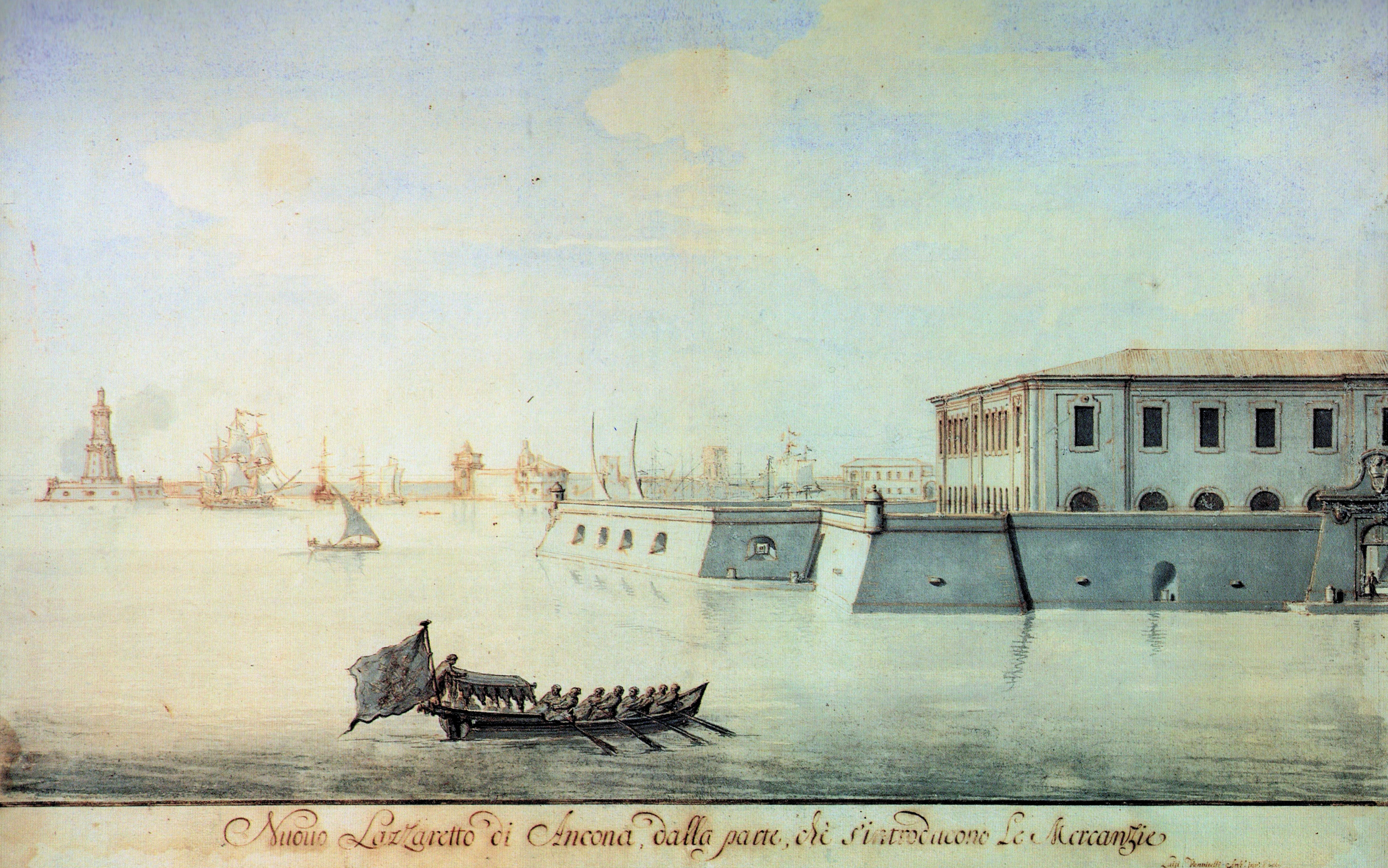
Painting by Vanvitelli depicting the Lazzaretto

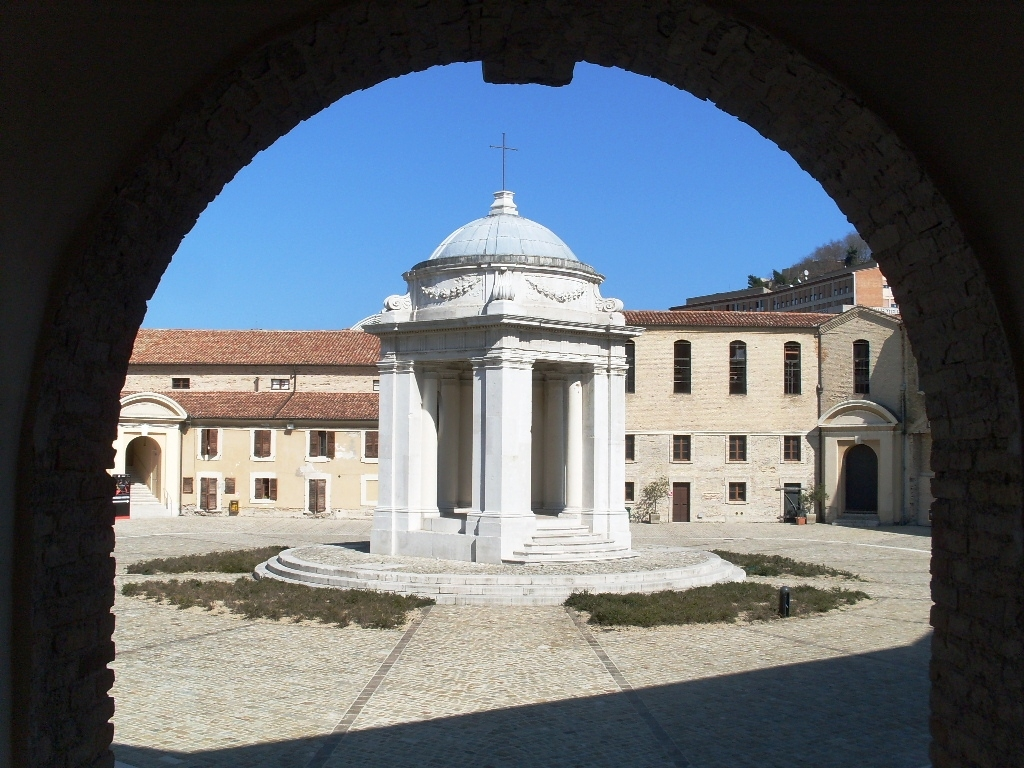
The central square and the Temple of Saint Roch

The allure of the Lazzaretto of Ancona is also due to its geometric shape, rich in symbolic meaning. Since the 1970s, with the rediscovery of the monument's artistic value, the symbolic value of the pentagonal shape has been highlighted: in numerology, the number five, reminiscent of the hand, indicates man's power to change the surrounding reality. In this, the Lazzaretto follows the Renaissance tradition of ideal cities with a pentagonal star plan and fortresses with the same shape.

Further studies have allowed us to delve deeper into the issue, revealing that the shapes and proportions of the Lazzaretto are generated by the Pythagorean symbol of the pentalpha, which with its five points encompasses the sum of the four elements of Empedocles and the fifth element, the quintessence, of spiritual nature, introduced by Pythagoras himself.

It is no coincidence, therefore, that the pentalpha, a sign of well-being and health, is depicted at the center of the dome of the temple of Saint Roch, which in turn is the geometric center of the entire Lazzaretto, a place of healing: the temple, in fact, is placed on top of the drinking water cistern, a fundamental element for the hygiene and health of those undergoing quarantine.

The figure of the pentalpha, however, characterizes not only the temple, but the entire island of the Lazzaretto. To understand this, it must be remembered that by connecting the points of the rays of a pentalpha, a pentagon is obtained, and that by extending the sides of this pentagon, another larger pentalpha is obtained, and so on; by performing these operations starting from the pentalpha depicted at the center of the dome, one can identify both the pentagon of the temple, that of the water cistern located under the courtyard, that of the courtyard itself, and, finally, the artificial pentagonal island on which the monument stands. The proportions and shapes of the Lazzaretto of Ancona are therefore determined and connected by a symbolic geometric relationship.

== See also ==
- Siege of Ancona (1860)
- The Pentagon

== Sources ==
- Pagnottella, Paolo (April 2010). "La (mancata) beffa di Ancona" [The (failed) hoax of Ancona (1918)]. Lo Specchio della Città (in Italian).
- "Mole". Comune di Ancona. Archived from the original on 27 July 2011.
