= Inquisitor's Palace =

Palace in Birgu, Malta

- Il-Palazz tal-Inkwiżitur
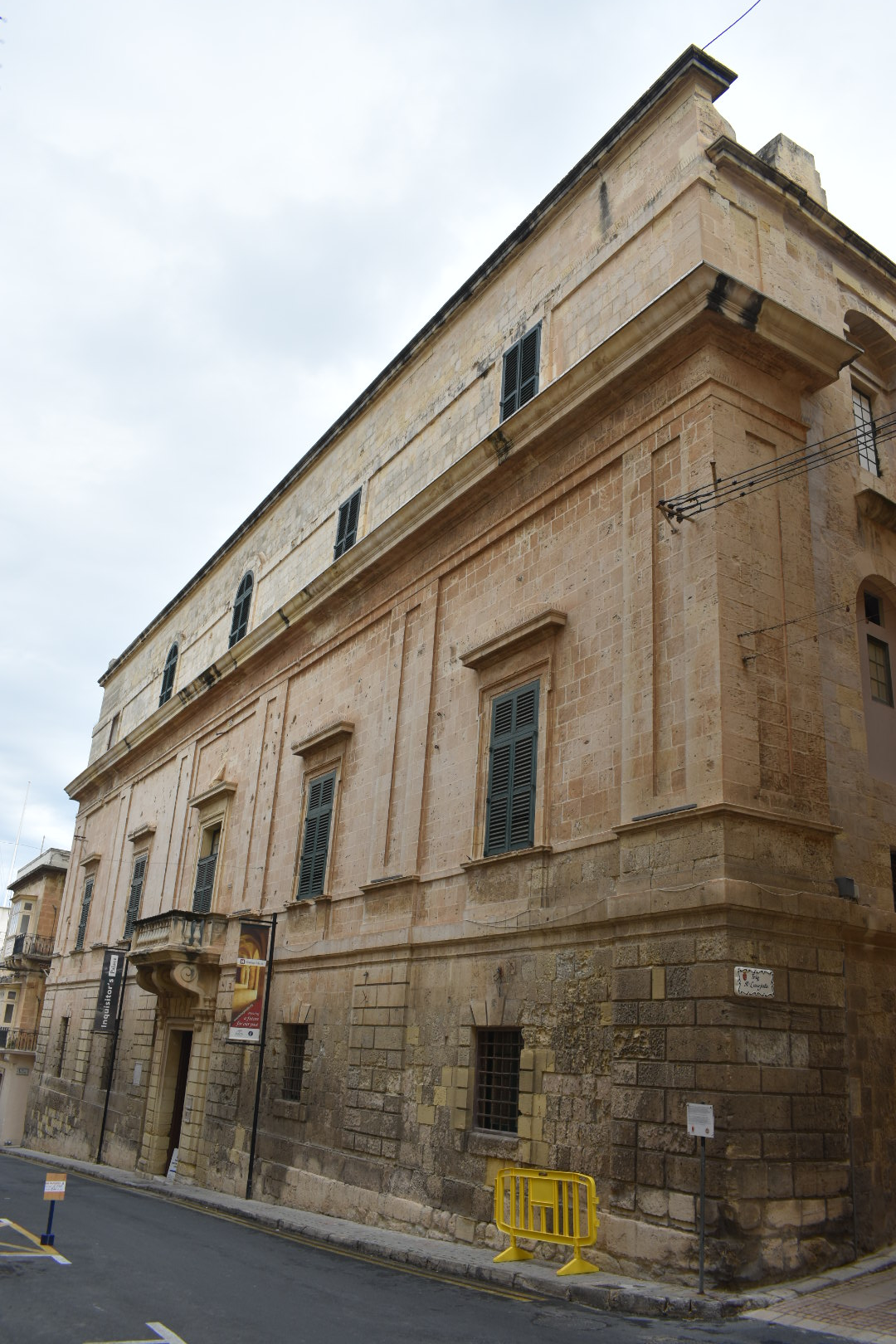
- Façade of the Inquisitor's Palace
- Former names: Castellania; Palazzo del Sant'Officio
- Alternative names: National Museum of Ethnography

General information
- Status: Intact
- Type: Courthouse, prison and palace (now museum)
- Location: Birgu, Malta
- Coordinates: 35°53′14″N 14°31′21″E
- Current tenants: Heritage Malta
- Completed: c. 1530s
- Renovated: 16th–20th centuries
- Owner: Government of Malta

Technical details
- Material: Limestone
- Floor count: 3

Design and construction
- Architect: Diego Perez de Malfreire or Nicolò Flavari (attributed)

Renovating team
- Architects: Several architects, including: Francesco Sammut; Giovanni Barbara; Romano Carapecchia

Website
- Heritage Malta

The Inquisitor's Palace (Maltese: Il-Palazz tal-Inkwiżitur), also known as the Sacred Palace, is a palace in Birgu, Malta. It was the seat of the Maltese Inquisition from 1574 to 1798, under the name Palazzo del Sant'Officio (Sicilian: Sant'Ujfizzio di Malta). The building was originally constructed as a courthouse known as the Castellania in the early 16th century, but little remains of the original building due to major alterations and renovations carried out in the subsequent centuries.

After the inquisition was abolished during the French occupation of Malta in 1798, the palace was used for a number of purposes, including as a military hospital, a mess hall and a convent. It has been a museum since 1966, being known as the National Museum of Ethnography since 1992. The building is one of the few surviving palaces of its kind in the world, and the only one which is open to the public.

== History ==
=== Castellania ===
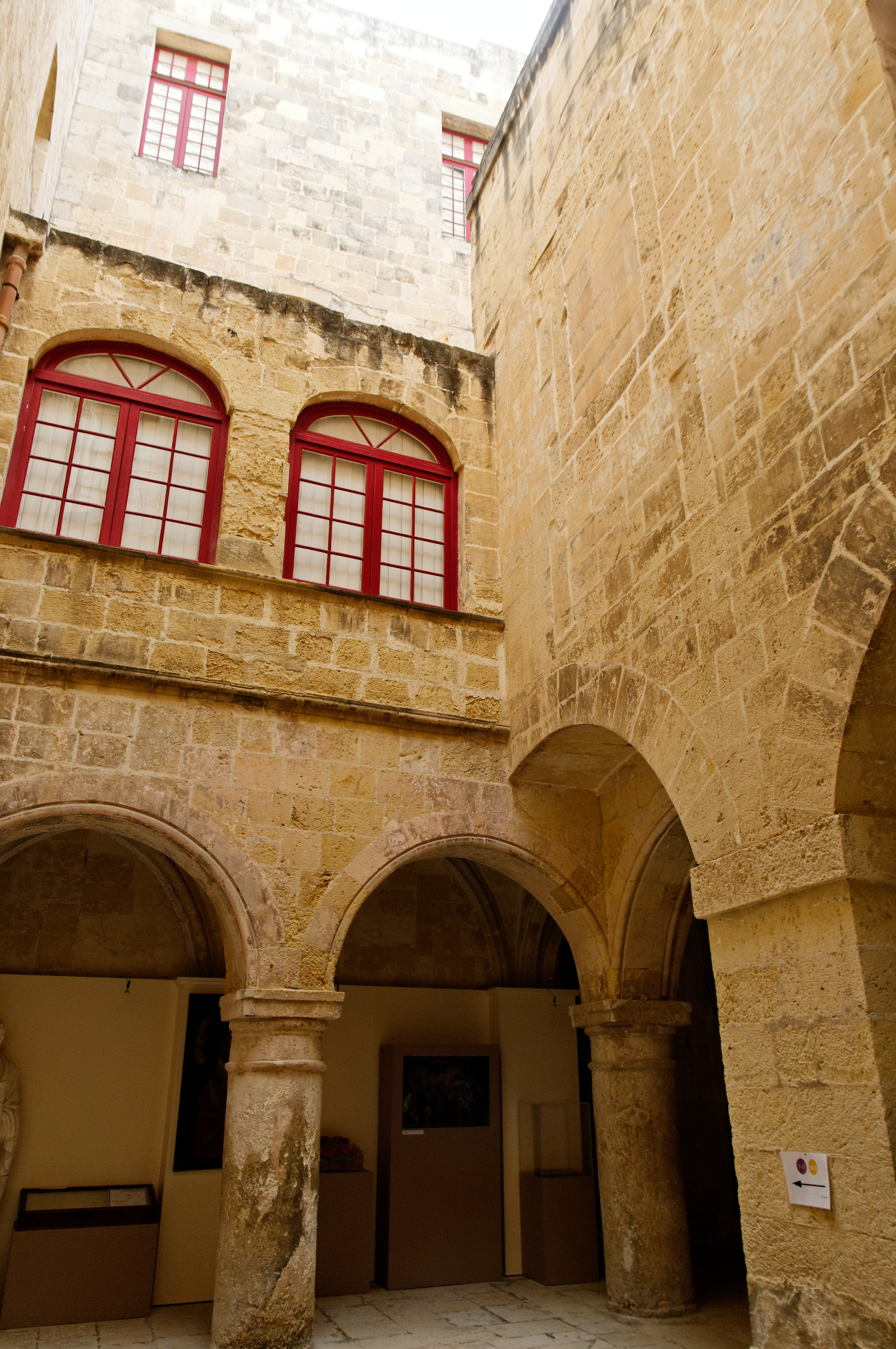
One of the courtyards of the Inquisitor's Palace, which is all that remains of the original Castellania

The palace was built in around the 1530s, and it initially housed the Magna Curia Castellania Melitensis, a tribunal which was established by Grand Master Juan de Homedes y Coscon in 1543. The building's original design is attributed to the architects Diego Perez de Malfreire or Nicolò Flavari. It remained in use as a courthouse until 1572, when a new Castellania was built in Valletta after the Order of St. John moved their headquarters there.

=== Inquisition ===
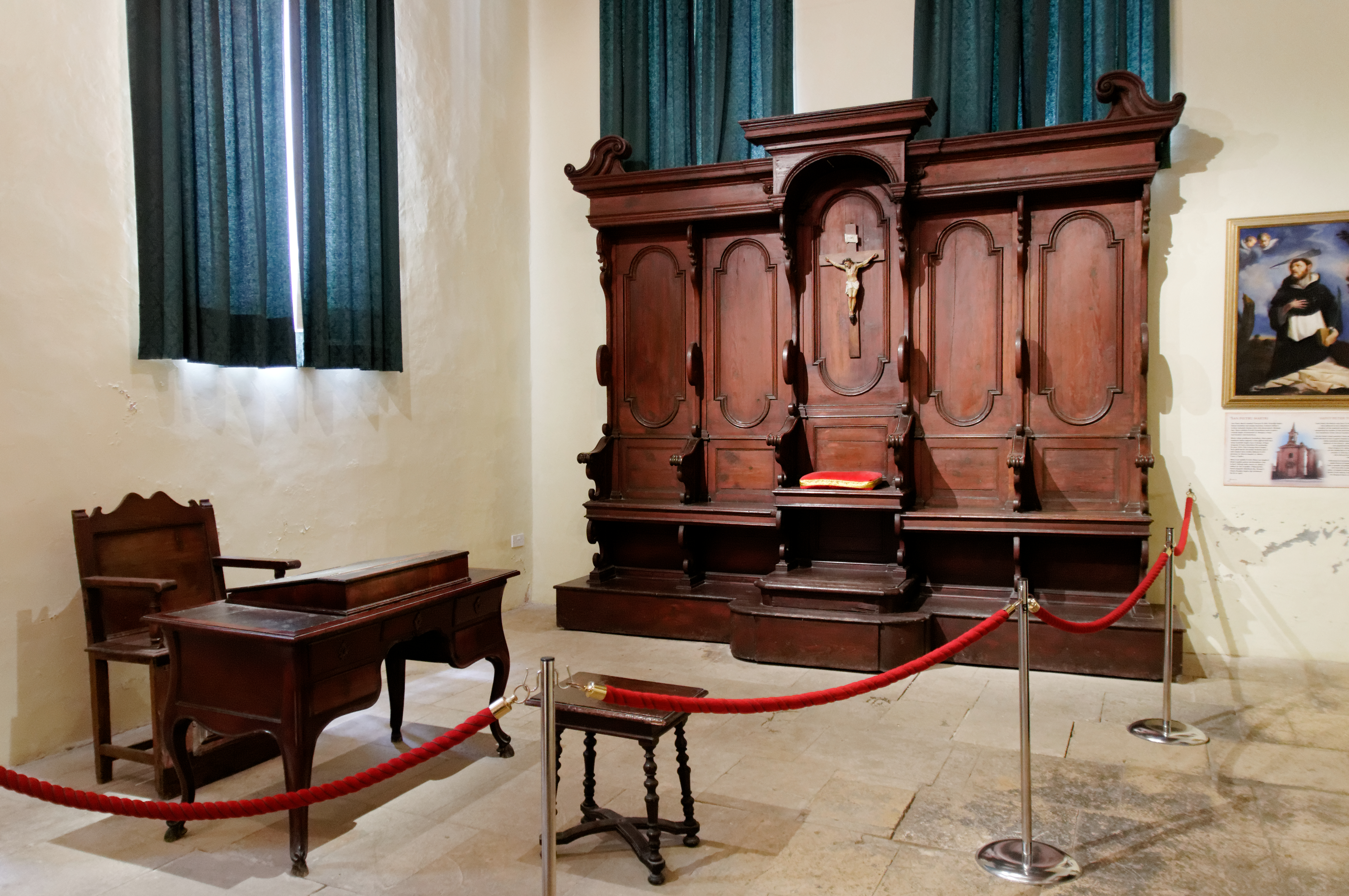
The tribunal of the inquisition

The Inquisition was established in Malta in September 1574, with the first inquisitor being Pietro Dusina. Grand Master Jean de la Cassière offered the former Castellania to Dusina as his official residence, who moved in after the building was renovated. The building became the headquarters of the Inquisition, serving as both a palace for the inquisitor and also housing the tribunal and prisons. A small room was used by Jews for prayers.

Between the late 16th and 18th centuries, the various inquisitors who lived and worked in the palace made a number of major alterations to the building, and it was gradually transformed into a typical Roman palazzo with some Baroque influences. The palace was enlarged with the acquisition of nearby properties, and the first major renovation began in the 1630s under inquisitor Fabio Chigi (later Pope Alexander VII). The façade was rebuilt in 1660 to designs of Francesco Sammut, although it is often mistakenly attributed to Francesco Buonamici.

The palace was damaged during the 1693 Sicily earthquake, resulting in further repairs and alterations. The upper floor was possibly built in 1707 by the architect Giovanni Barbara. The interior was also altered and embellished throughout the 17th and 18th centuries, with the main staircase being built in 1733 to designs of Romano Carapecchia. Due to these modifications, the building has a somewhat labyrinthine plan. The only remains of the original Castellania is a small courtyard with a Gothic groin vault cloister.

=== French occupation and British rule ===
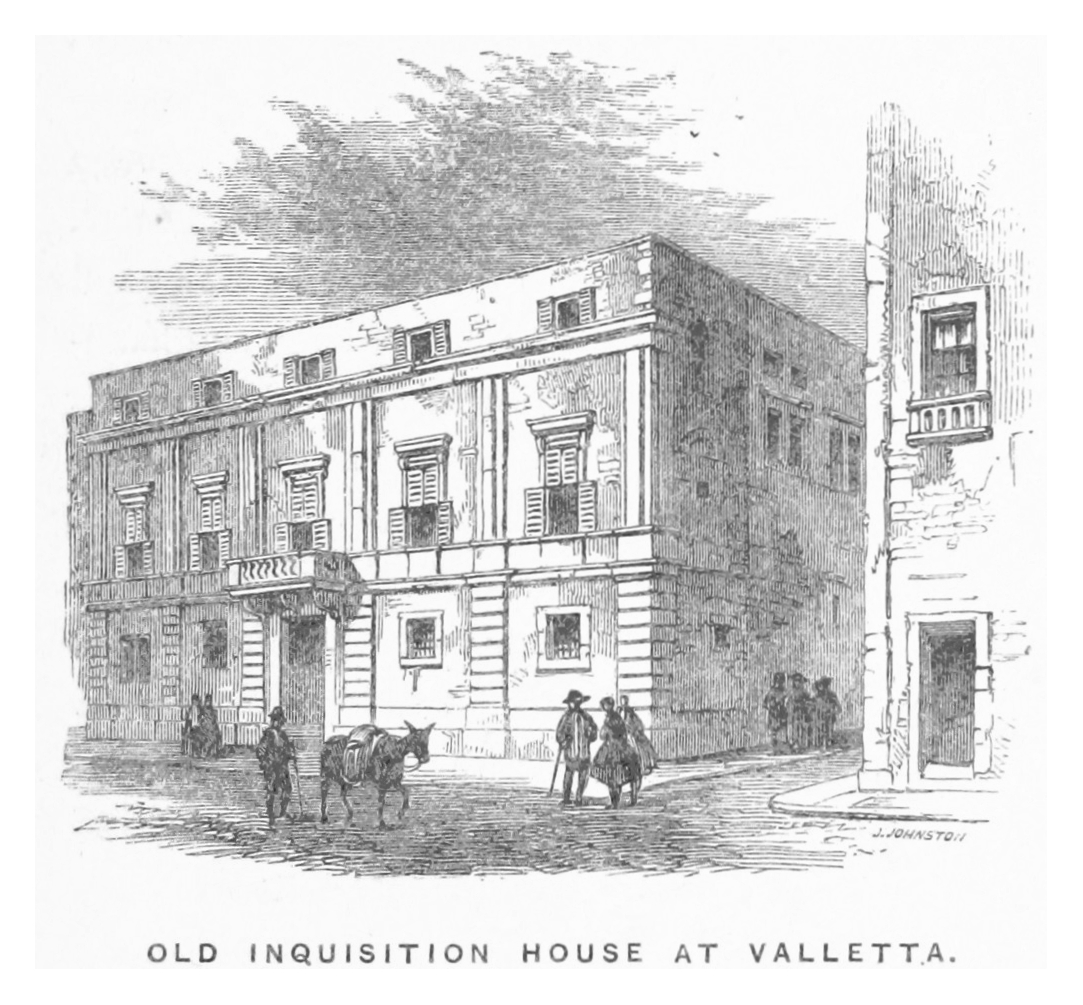
An 1861 engraving of the palace

The inquisition was abolished during the French occupation of Malta in June 1798. During French rule, the building was used as the headquarters of the Cottonera district. The coats of arms on the façade and some of those inside the building were probably defaced or removed at this point. Those forming the top hierarchy of the inquisition were given two days to leave the country.

When Malta was taken over by the British in 1800, the building was passed on to the military authorities. It was initially used as a military hospital, and it was converted into a mess-house for officers stationed at the barracks near Fort Saint Michael in nearby Senglea. Several alterations were made to the building by the British military throughout the course of the 19th century.

Around the turn of the century, the building was transferred to the civil authorities in exchange for some property in Valletta. The Public Works Office made plans to demolish the palace and replace it by government apartments in 1908, but nothing materialized.

=== Museum ===
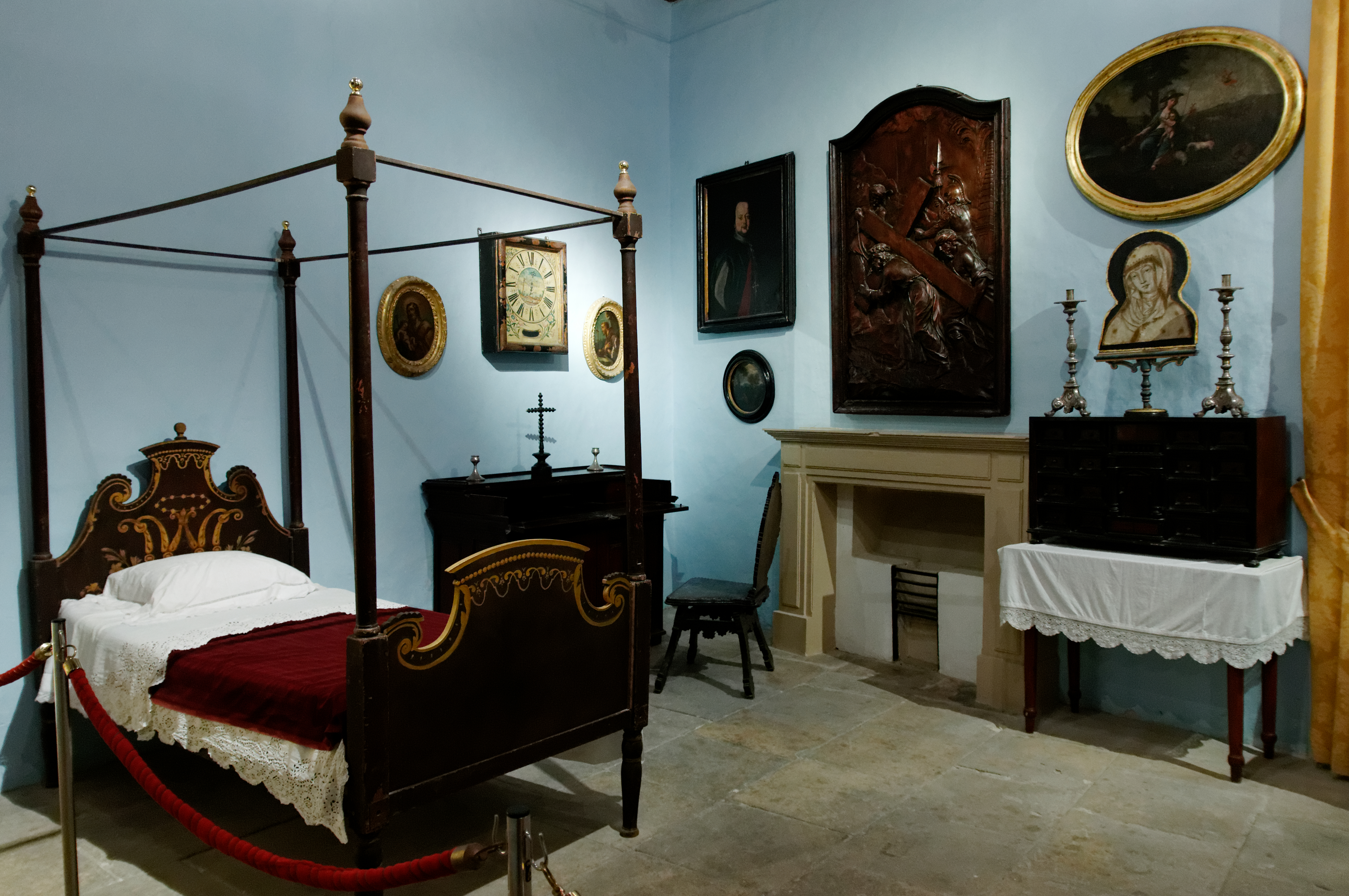
The inquisitor's bedroom

The Inquisitor's Palace was passed to the Museums Department in 1926, and an extensive restoration was carried out by Vincenzo Bonello and Antonio Sciortino until 1939. In 1942, the palace was converted into a temporary Dominican convent after their original convent and church had been destroyed by aerial bombardment in World War II. The palace survived the bombings, and it was transferred back to the Museums Department after the Dominicans rebuilt their convent in 1954.

The palace was restored again and it opened as a museum called the Inquisitor's Palace on 21 February 1966. The upper floor became a Folklore Museum on 5 December 1981, but by the late 1980s the museum was in decline and only parts of it remained open to the public. The palace was fully reopened as the National Museum of Ethnography in 1992, and apart from a museum it also houses Heritage Malta's ethnography section.

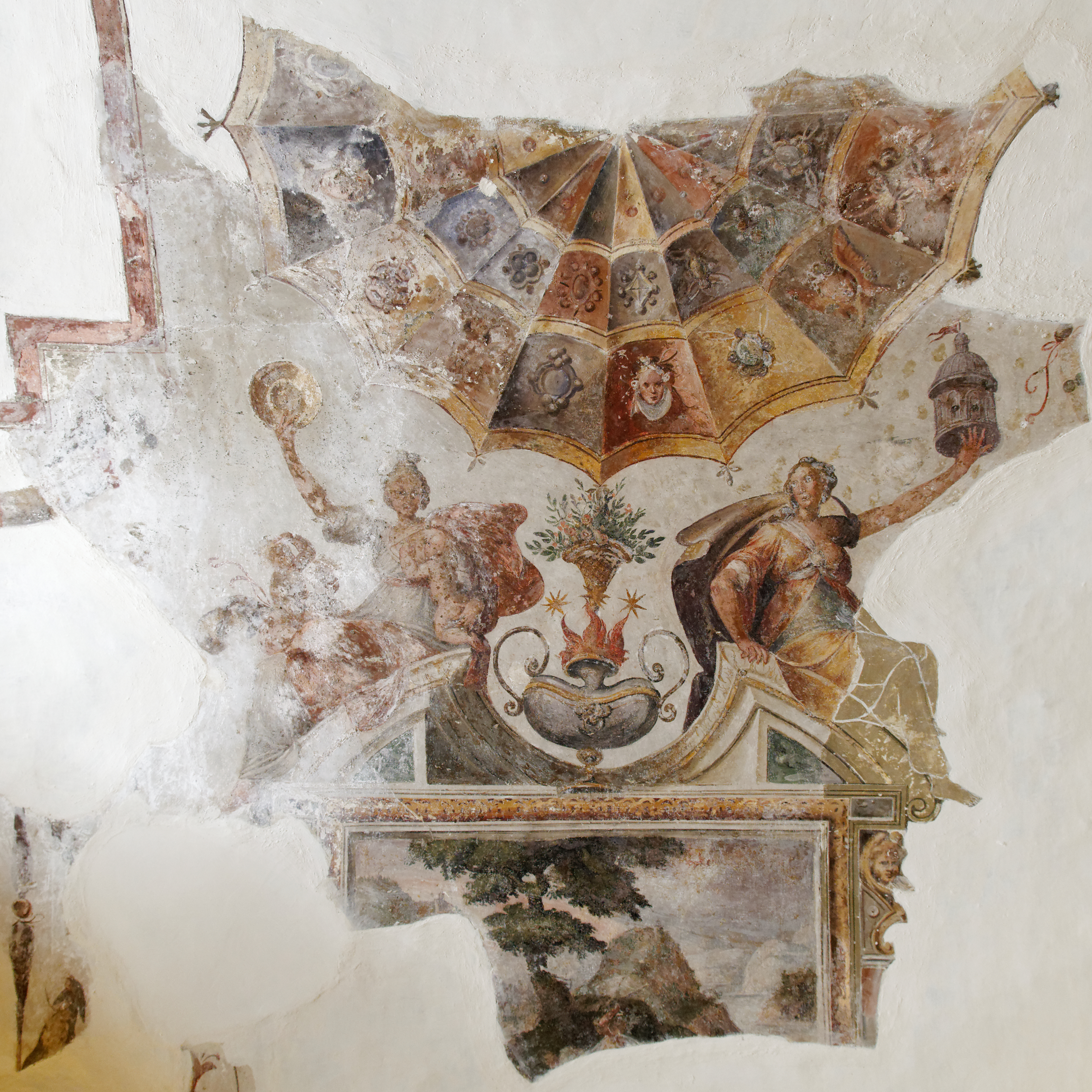
Remains of a fresco at the palace

Apart from exhibits relating to the inquisition, the museum's collections also include a number of wooden architectural models of destroyed landmarks, including representations of Birgu before the World War II bombings, the Order's bakery in Valletta before it was demolished in the 1930s, and the Manderaggio before it was rebuilt in the 1950s.

The Inquisitor's Palace is one of the few surviving palaces of its kind around the world, and the only one which is open to the public. Many buildings used by the inquisition were destroyed during and after the French Revolution, or were left to decay over the centuries. The summer residence of Malta's inquisitor, Girgenti Palace, has also survived and it is now the summer residence of the Prime Minister of Malta.

The building was included on the Antiquities List of 1925. It is now a Grade 1 national monument, and it is also listed on the National Inventory of the Cultural Property of the Maltese Islands.

== Architecture ==
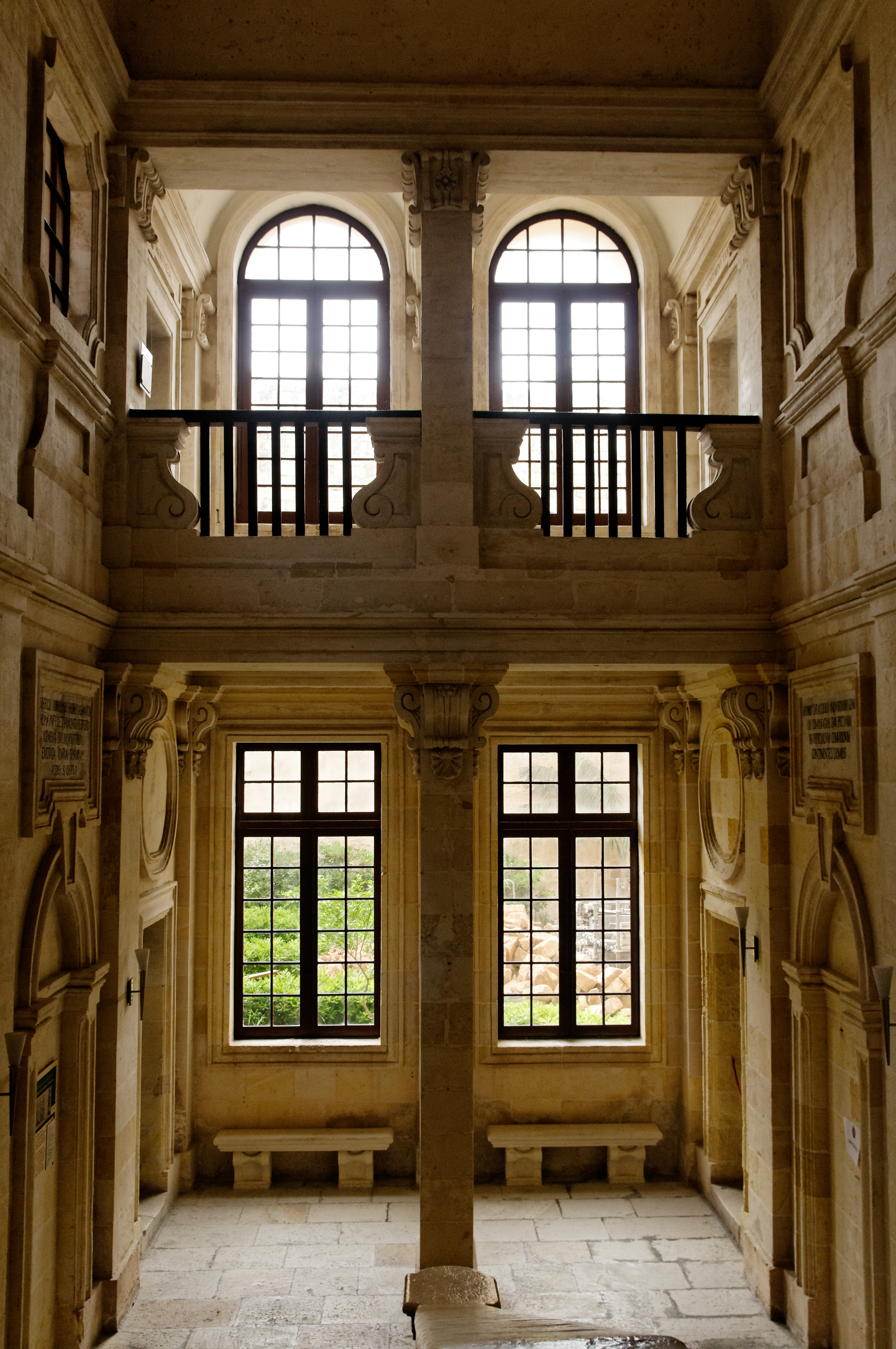
The palace's interior near the main staircase

The Inquisitor's Palace is built in a number of architectural styles, but overall it resembles a Roman palazzo. It has a symmetrical façade which is divided by piers into five bays. The piers on the ground floor are rusticated, while those on the first floor are smooth-faced. The central bay contains the main doorway on the ground floor, above which is an open balcony supported on corbels. Two windows flank either side of the central bay, and they have rusticated surrounds on the ground floor and mouldings on the first floor. A string course runs along the first floor window sill level. The façade also has a socle to make up for the steep slope of the street.

Since the building was constructed over the course of the 16th, 17th and 18th centuries, with further alterations and restorations in the 19th and 20th centuries, its interior has a labyrinthine plan. One of the courtyards has a Gothic groin vault cloister, and this is the only part of the building that remains from the Castellania.

== See also ==
- Girgenti Palace, originally the inquisitor's summer residence

== Bibliography ==
- Gambin, Kenneth (2003). The Inquisitor's Palace – Vittoriosa. Santa Venera: Heritage Books (subsidiary of Midsea Books Ltd). ISBN 9789993239772.
- Bonnici, Alessandro (1968). L'Inquisizione di Malta 1561-1798. Melita Historica. Retrieved on 2 August 2016.
