= Santa Anna (1522 ship) =

Knights Hospitaller carrack (1522–1540)

History

Malta
- Launched: 21 December 1522
- Fate: Abandoned 1540

General characteristics
- Type: Carrack
- Tons burthen: 900 tons
- Complement: 500 marines + unknown number of sailors
- Armament: 50 guns

Santa Anna was an early 16th-century carrack of the navy of the Knights Hospitaller. The war ship was celebrated for her many modern features. While some authors view her lead sheathed hull as an early form of ironclad, others regard it primarily as a means to improve her watertightness.

== Career ==
Santa Anna was launched in Nice on 21 December 1522, one day before the Knights Hospitaller surrendered at the siege of Rhodes (1522) under honorable terms.

Santa Anna's underwater hull was completely sheathed with lead plates. Above the waterline two of the six decks were also armoured with lead plates, which were fastened by bronze nails to the wooden hull. Santa Anna was designed to accommodate 500 marines besides her sailors and she featured large below-deck cabins and messes for her officers. The carrack housed a forge, where three weapon smiths could do maintenance work at sea. The ship even had several ovens and its own mill, in order to provide the crew with fresh bread. The ship also featured a garden on board with flowers hanging down from the stern gallery in boxes.

In 1531, the Santa Anna was sailing between Favignana and Levanzo when it was attacked by an Ottoman fleet of 25 galleys commanded by Hayreddin Barbarossa and Sinan Reis. Her captain Francois de Toucheboef ordered to open fire on them, damaging the nearest Turk ships, and headed to an island cove, from where she could comfortably fire on them without being surrounded. The Ottomans eventually desisted and withdrew.

One year later, the carrack took part in the expedition against the Peloponnese under the command of Andrea Doria, during which Koroni, Patras and the Turkish fortresses protecting the entry to the Gulf of Corinth were jointly conquered. In 1535 Santa Anna fought in the successful conquest of Tunis by the Spanish fleet under Charles V, where the Spaniards managed to capture over 100 ships of the Barbary corsairs. Her firepower contributed significantly in the assault on the fortress of La Goulette which controlled the entry to the harbour.

Temporarily, the carrack was also employed as a wheat freighter, with an impressive capacity of up to 900 tons. Only eighteen years after her launch, Santa Anna was stripped and abandoned in 1540 on the order of Grand Master Juan de Homedes y Coscon.

== See also ==
- List of ships of the line of Malta
- List of longest wooden ships
- Finis Bellis
- Madre de Deus
- Peter Pomegranate
- São João Baptista (galleon)
