= French ship Dégo (1798) =

Ship of the line of the French Navy

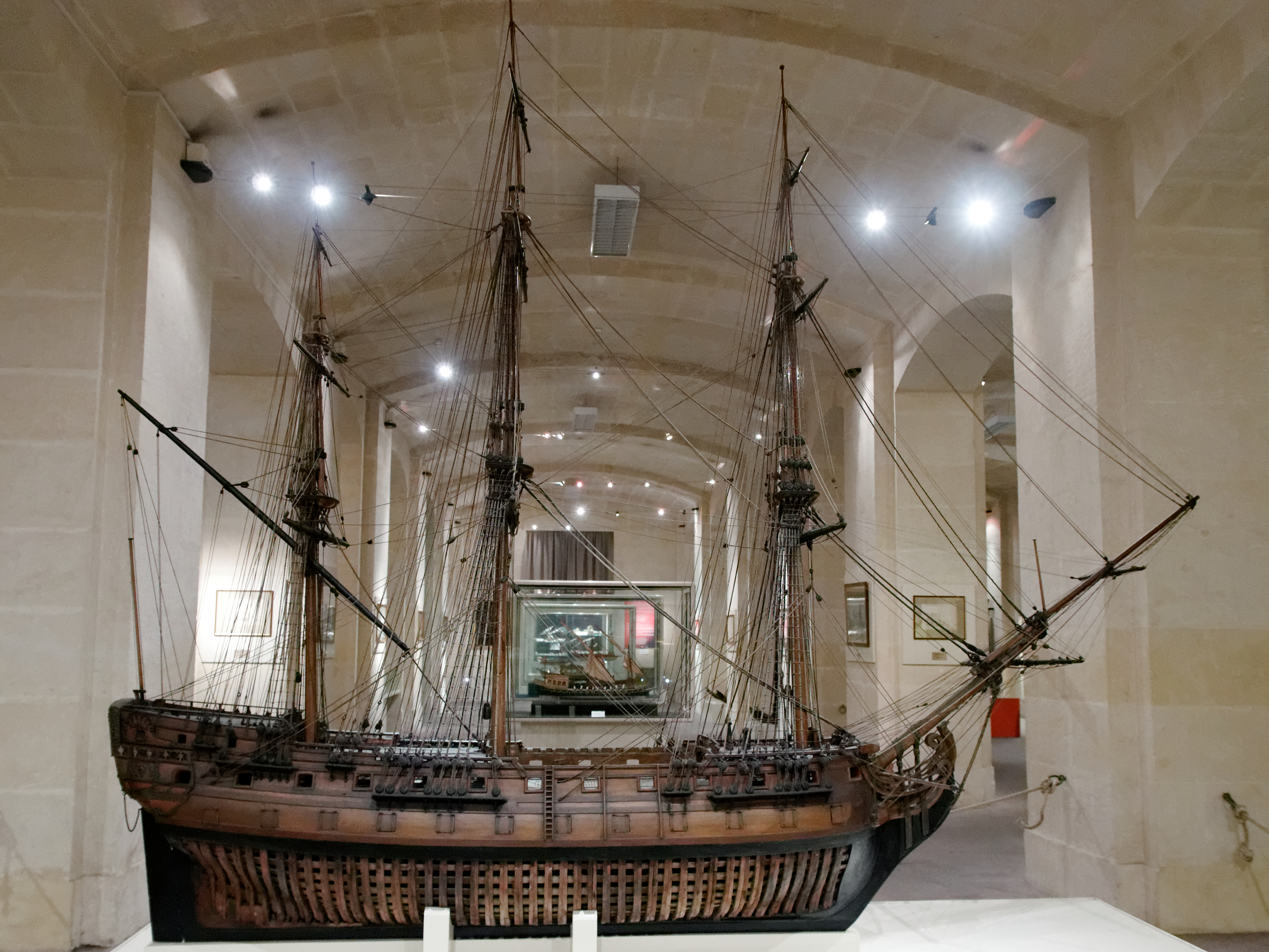
- Model of a Maltese ship of the line, similar to San Zaccharia, at the Malta Maritime Museum

History

Malta
- Name: San Zaccharia
- Namesake: Zechariah
- Builder: Senglea Dockyard, Malta
- Laid down: 1763
- Launched: 7 March 1765
- Completed: By 21 July 1765
- Out of service: Surrendered to France in June 1798

France
- Name: Dégo
- Namesake: First Battle of Dego, Second Battle of Dego
- Acquired: June 1798
- Out of service: Surrendered to the British on 4 September 1800
- Fate: Broken up in 1803

General characteristics
- Sail plan: Full-rigged ship
- Armament: 64 guns

San Zaccharia was a 64-gun ship of the line of the navy of the Order of Saint John which was eventually seized and incorporated into the French Navy as Dégo.

Construction of San Zaccharia began in 1763 at Senglea Dockyard, Malta under the supervision of Master Shipwrights Agostino and Giuseppe Scolaro. She was launched two years later on 7 March 1765 and had been completed by 21 July 1765. She served with the Navy of the Order of Saint John until the French invaded Malta on 11 June 1798, as part of the Mediterranean campaign of 1798. Her name was first gallicised into Zacharie, but she was promptly renamed Dégo upon request by Napoleon.

Dégo was blockaded in the Grand Harbour during the siege of Malta by Coalition forces, and was used as a prison hulk in Valletta harbour, being steadily stripped for firewood. She was eventually captured when the island surrendered on 4 September 1800, but the British considered her too worn out to take into service. She probably continued in use as a prison hulk, until she was sold for breaking up in 1803.
