= Manderaggio =

Neighborhood in Valletta, Malta

Coordinates: 35°53′58.4″N 14°30′37.2″E

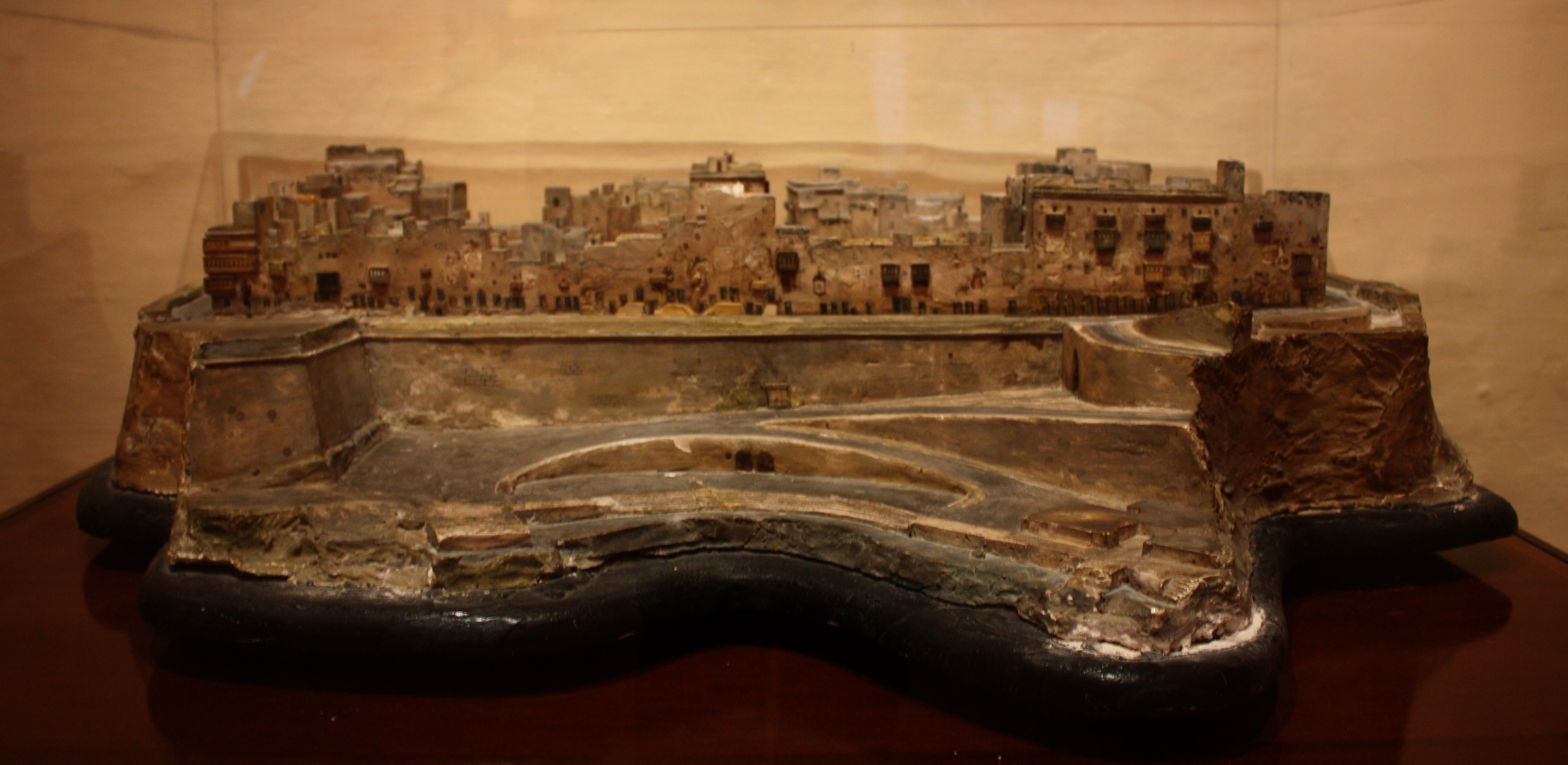
A model of the Manderaggio found inside the Inquisitor's Palace

The area after redevelopment as viewed from the Fortifications Interpretation Centre

The Manderaggio (Maltese: Il-Mandraġġ) is a neighbourhood in Valletta, Malta. It is located behind the Manderaggio Curtain of the fortifications of Valletta, on the side of Marsamxett Harbour.

Originally intended as a mandracchio for galleys, it became a slum area in the late 16th century. By the early 20th century, over 2,500 people lived in an area of 2.5 acres (10,000 m^{2}), with the worst sanitary conditions on the Maltese islands. The slums were demolished in the 1950s, being replaced by housing estates and a square.

== History ==
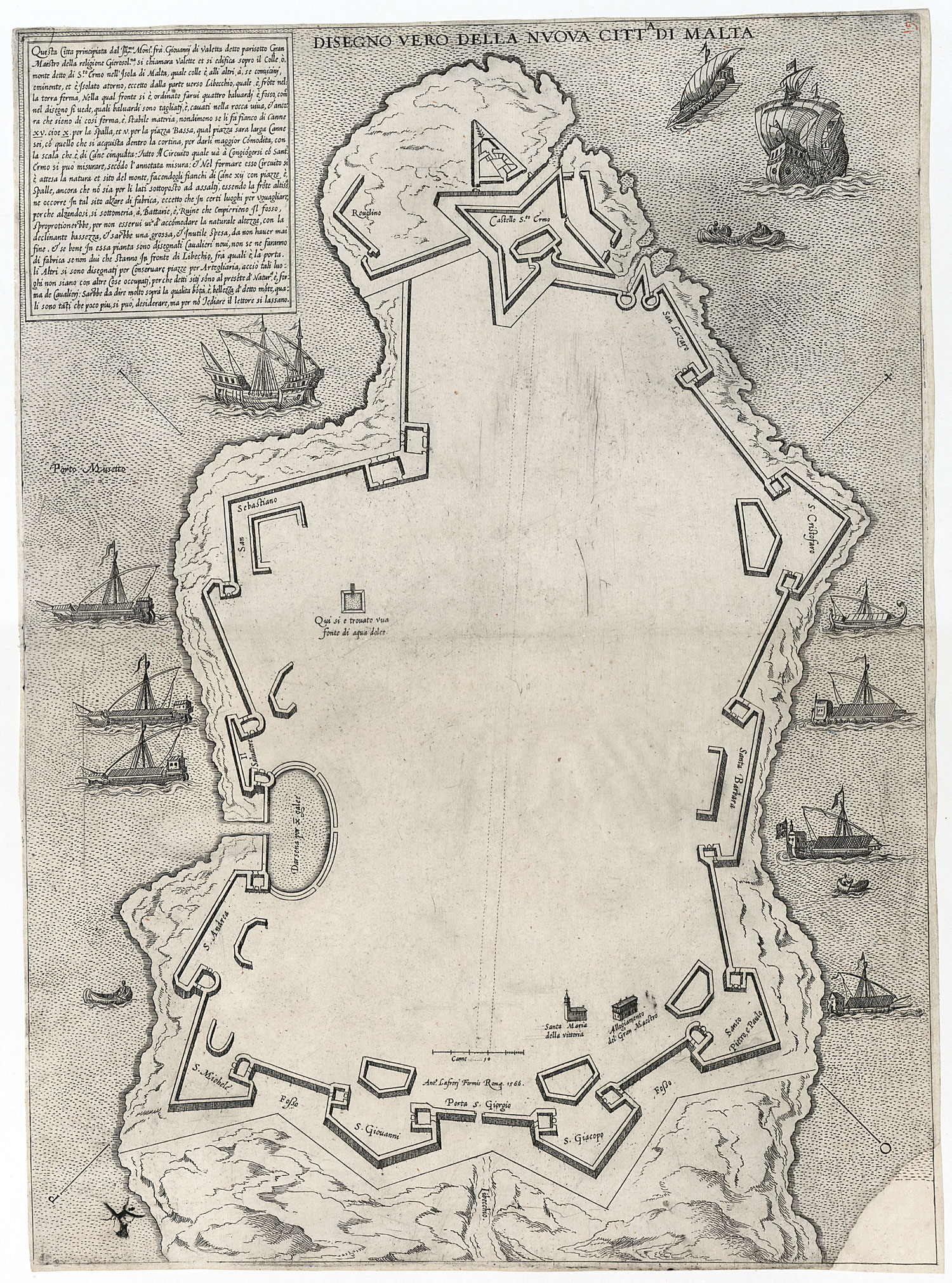
1566 engraving of Valletta, showing the proposed galley pen to the left

When the city of Valletta began to be constructed in 1566, the Order of St. John planned to build a mandracchio, a sheltered area to serve as a galley pen, in Marsamxett Harbour. The area began to be excavated, and the stones quarried were used to build houses in the city. However, the rocks proved to be unsuitable for construction. This pen would also mean that the galleys would be placed in Marsamxett Harbour which did not offer as much protection as the Grand Harbour. Thus, the project was abandoned.

Between 1572 and 1600, houses began to be built within the abandoned quarry. The outer houses, located in four streets surrounding the area (St. Mark, St. Lucia, St. Patrick and Marsamxett Streets), kept with the architecture of Valletta, but the inner circle of houses was built with no prior planning, and became a slum area.

The entrances to the slum area were located in St. Mark, St. Lucia and St. Patrick Streets. The entrance at St. Mark Street was known as Il-mina taċ-Ċintura, while that at St. Lucia Street was called It-tomba tal-Mandraġġ. The Manderaggio consisted of a single street called Triq il-Mandraġġ (Manderaggio Street), as well as a number of alleys, which were known by several names such as it-triq tal-kanal (canal street) and it-triq ta' taħt il-bastjun (street under the bastion).

At its main entrance, Manderaggio Street was about 7 m (23 ft) wide, like the streets in other parts of Valletta. However, along the way the street was only 2 m (6 ft 7 in) wide, with buildings being about 3 m (9.8 ft) away from each other. The streets in the Manderaggio had a length of around 574 m (1,883 ft), so the area had a road space of around 1,940 m^{2} (20,900 sq ft)

The heights of the buildings in the Manderaggio ranged from around two to three floors in St. Mark Street, four floors in St. Lucia Street, and four or five floors in St. Patrick and Marsamxett Streets.

In the early 20th century, the Manderaggio had a population of 2,544.

== Redevelopment ==
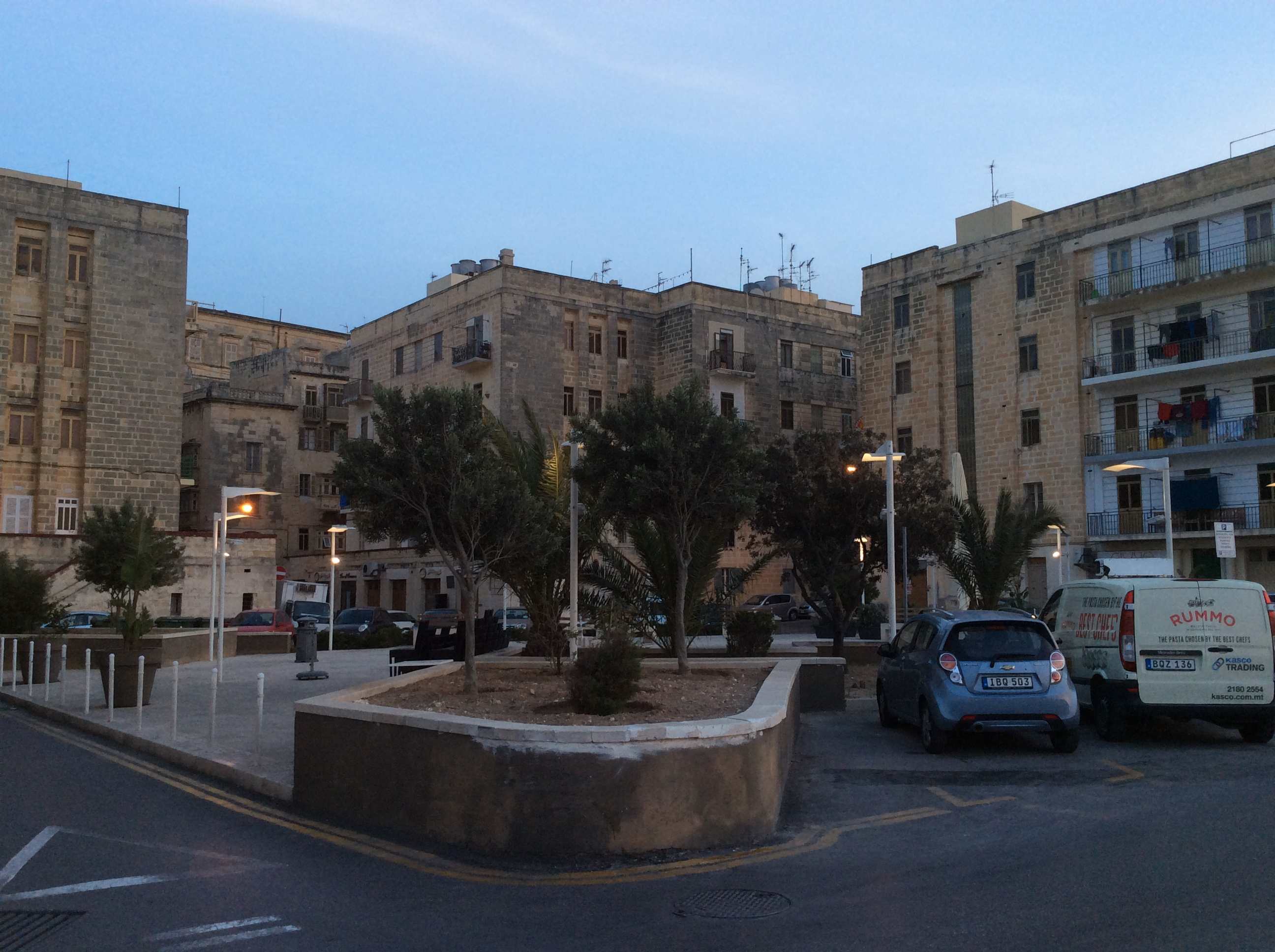

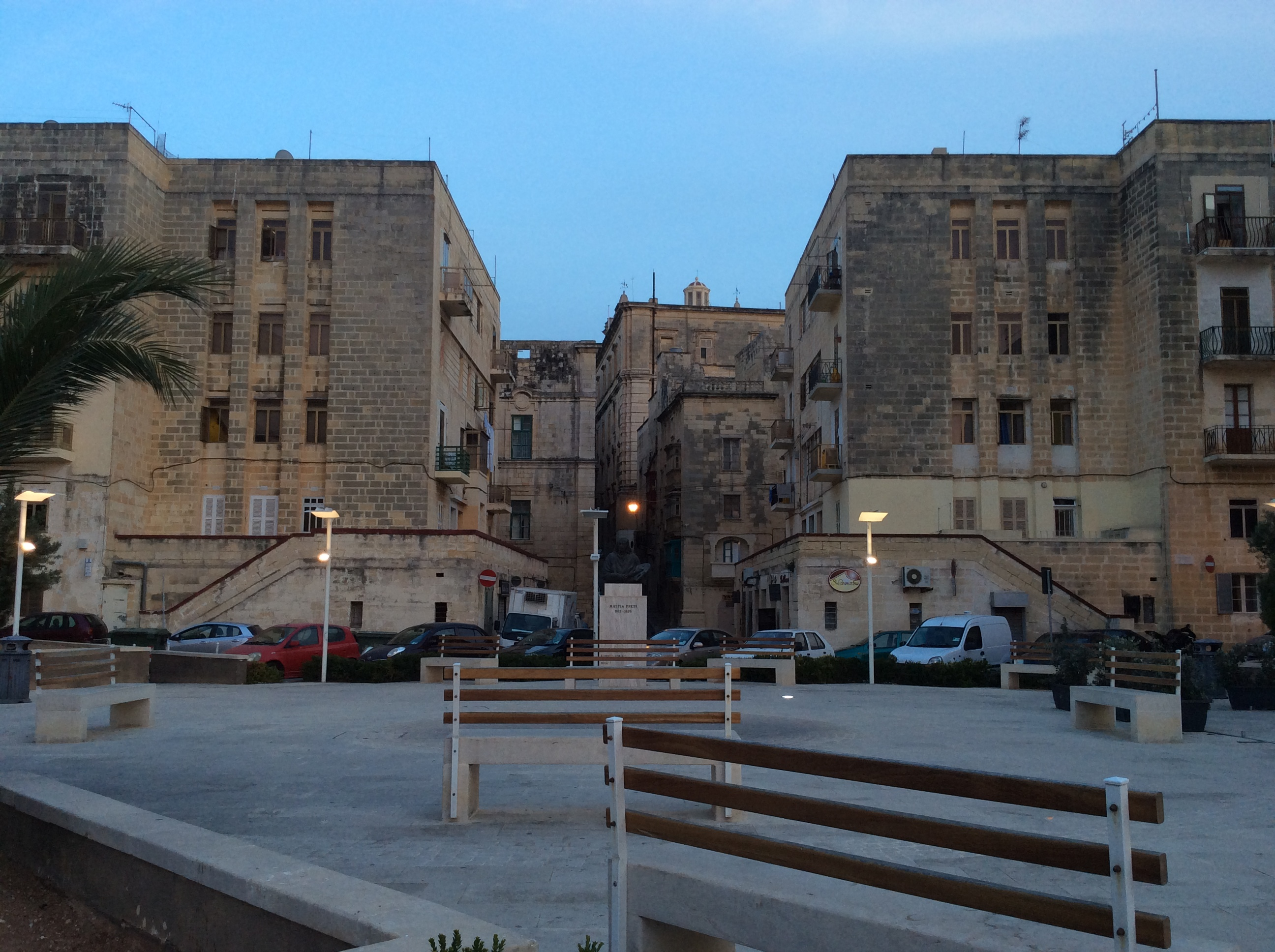
Mattia Preti Square and the housing estates at the Manderaggio

In the 19th and early 20th centuries, the Professor Bernard, Dr. W. H. Burrell, Captain P. Galton, Dr. J. Sutherland, Mr. Read, Sir Walter Johnson C.M.G., F.R.C.S. and several other people made reports calling for the demolition of the Manderaggio due to a lack of space and hygiene.

In 1913, Attilo Critien, who was the head of the Department of Health, visited the Manderaggio and found out that there were around 333 dwellings in the slum. He published his findings in the report The Manderaggio. Notes, historical and other in 1938.

In the Government Gazette of 24 March 1937, the government issued a draft Ordinance on improving areas which had substandard hygiene, including the Manderaggio. The scheme began to be implemented in November 1948, when the area's inhabitants were granted temporary residence in other parts of Valletta or in various localities around Malta, such as Floriana, Gżira and St. Julian's. Meanwhile, the houses in the Manderaggio began to be demolished and rebuilt as housing estates. The first block of 42 flats was completed on 8 August 1951 by the Ministry of Works and Reconstruction. The remaining flats were completed in the 1950s. Today, very few buildings of the original Manderaggio remain, and they are located in Marsamxett Street.

One of the buildings which was demolished during the reconstruction of the Manderaggio was a house which had belonged to the 17th-century artist Mattia Preti.

In 1938, Rużar Calleja made a 1:16 scale model of the Manderaggio. It took nine months to build, and is now exhibited in the Inquisitor's Palace in Birgu.
