= Mandracchio =

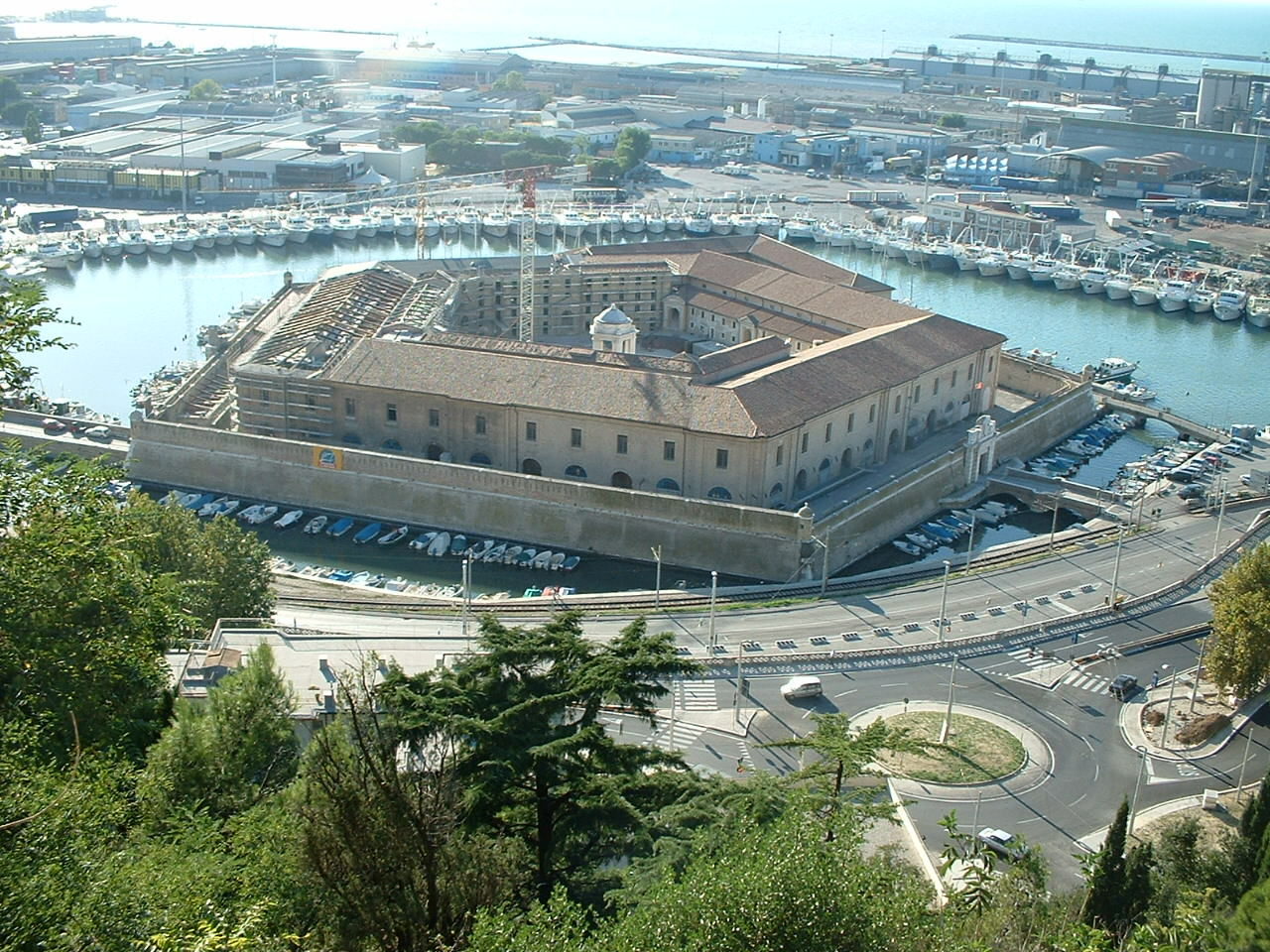
Mandracchio of Ancona near the Lazzaretto

A mandracchio is a small sheltered harbour reserved for the mooring of small boats and fishing vessels.

Many mandracchios are found in Italy, including at Ancona, Genoa, La Spezia and Muggia. Naples and Trieste also had mandracchios, but they no longer exist. Mandracchios were also found elsewhere in the Mediterranean, including in Slovenia, Greece and Malta.

The cities of Naples, Livorno and San Benedetto del Tronto still have districts called Mandracchio. In Greece, the harbour of Rhodes and the towns of Mandràki Nisyrou in Nisyros and Mandràki Serròn in Serres include mandràki (Greek: μανδράκι), the Greek word for mandracchio, in their names. An area in Valletta, Malta is also known as the Manderaggio (Maltese: Il-Mandraġġ).

== Etymology ==
The name mandracchio comes from mandria, the Italian word for "herd", since boats in a mandracchio were gathered like a herd, to occupy as little space as possible.
