= Malta Maritime Museum =

- Mużew Marittimu ta' Malta
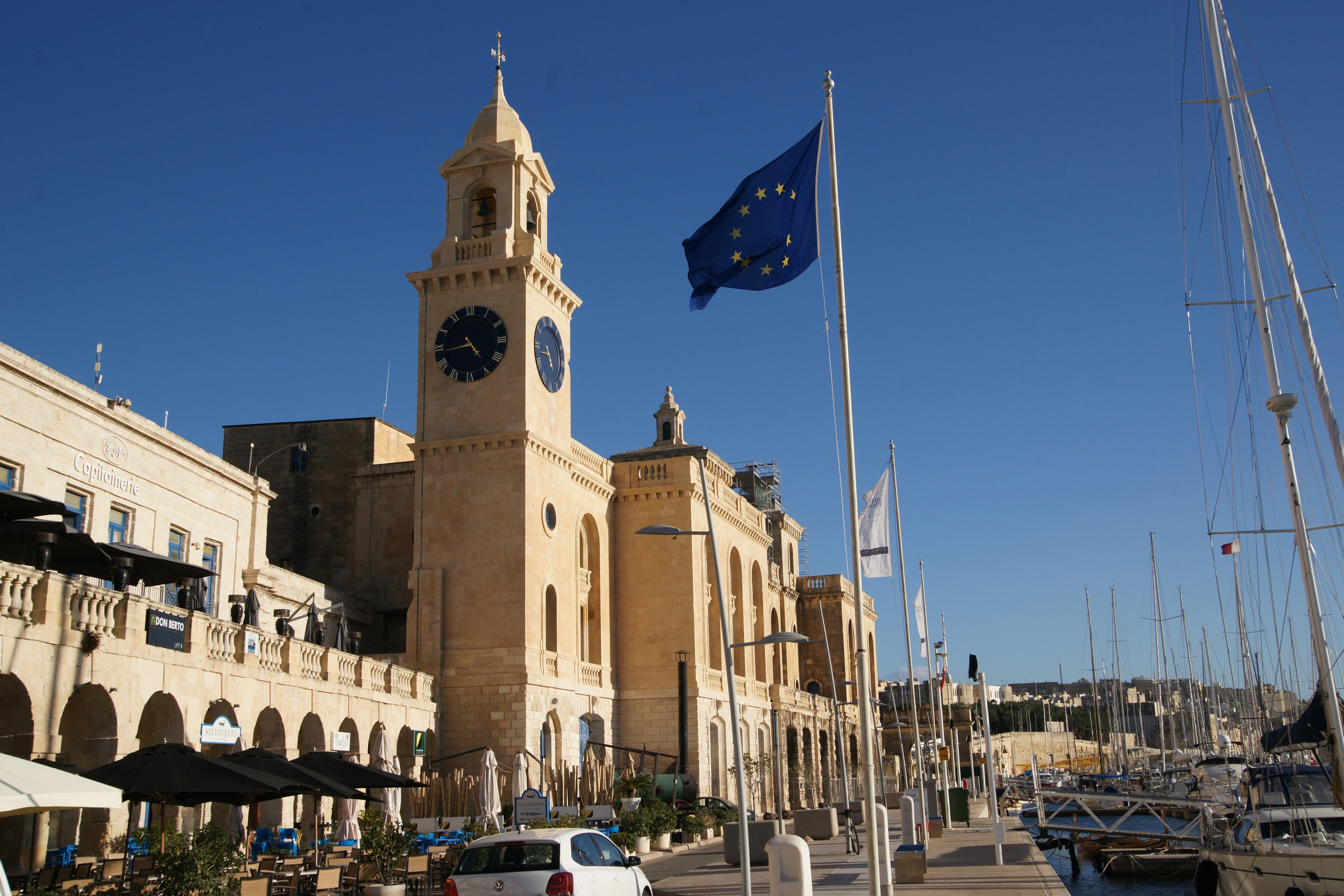
- The Malta Maritime Museum as viewed from the Birgu waterfront
- Established: 24 July 1992
- Location: Birgu, Malta
- Coordinates: 35°53′15″N 14°31′15″E
- Type: Maritime museum
- Collection size: over 20,000 artifacts
- Curator: Liam Gauci
- Owner: Heritage Malta
- Website: Heritage Malta

The Malta Maritime Museum (Maltese: Mużew Marittimu ta' Malta) is a maritime museum in Birgu, Malta. It is housed in the former Royal Naval Bakery, which was built in the 1840s as the main bakery for the Mediterranean Fleet. The museum has a collection of over 20,000 artifacts, and it is the largest museum on the island. The museum's aim is to illustrate Malta's maritime history, starting from prehistory to the present. The museum shows this within a Mediterranean and a global context.

== History ==
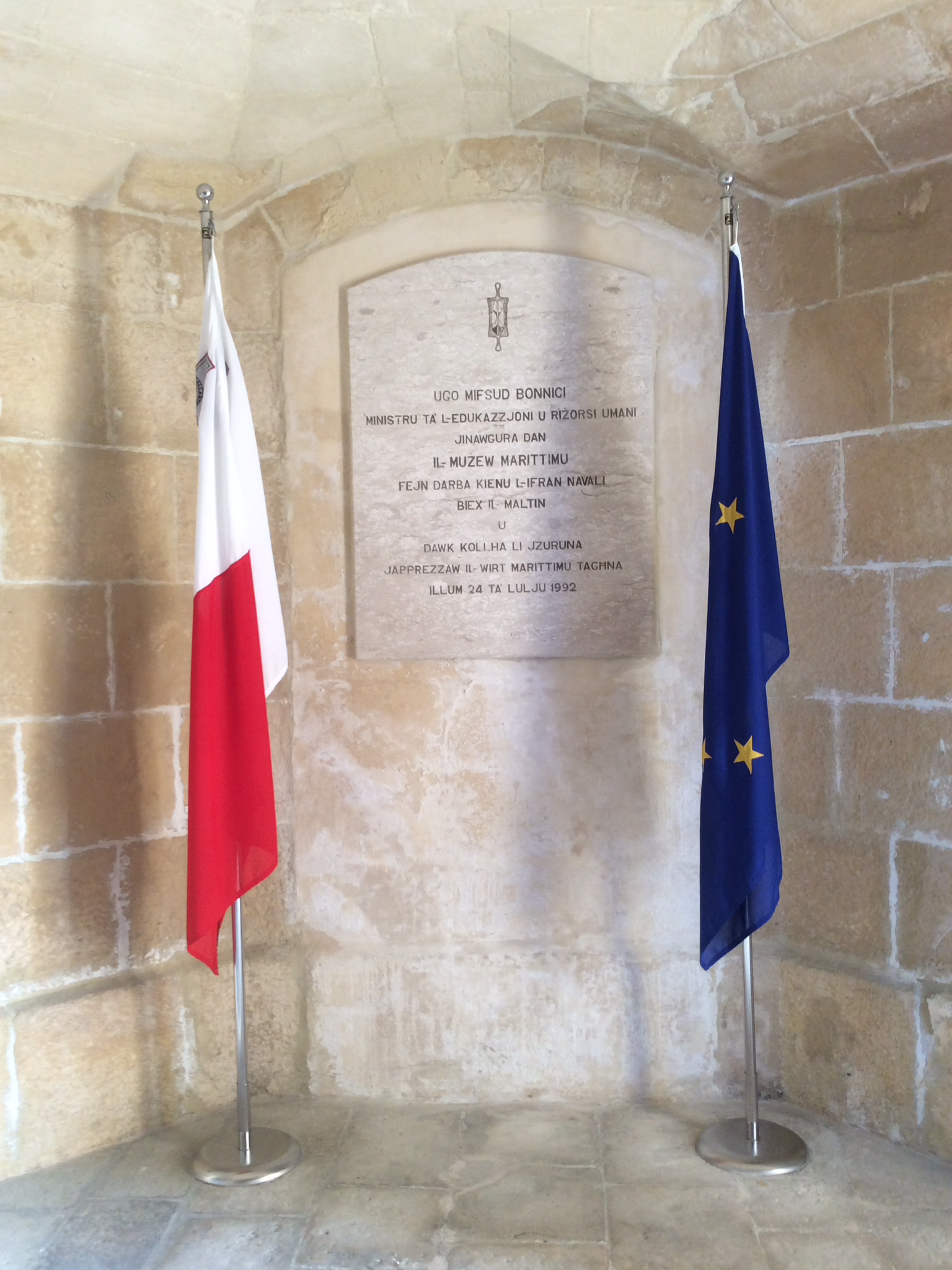
Plaque commemorating the opening of the museum in 1992

The first plans to establish the Malta Maritime Museum were made in 1988, when an advisory committee was set up to set up the museum and collect artifacts from a number of sources. The then-derelict former Royal Naval Bakery in Birgu was chosen to house the museum.

After four years, the museum opened to the public on 24 July 1992. It was inaugurated by the Minister for Education and Museums, Ugo Mifsud Bonnici. Since its establishment, the museum's collections have increased by donations from Maltese and foreign individuals, foreign maritime museums, foreign navies, and several companies and corporate bodies.

== The building ==
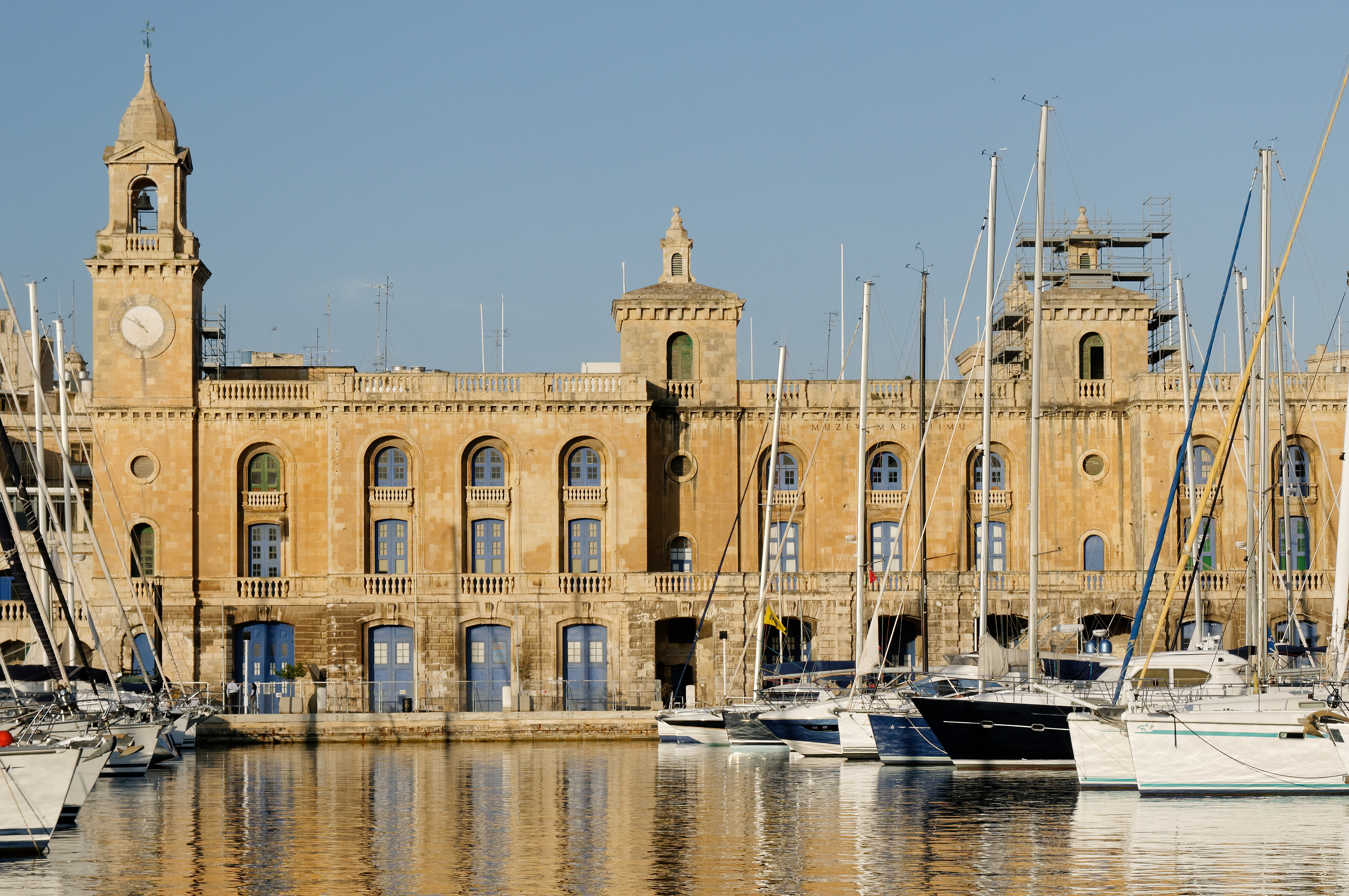
The Malta Maritime Museum as seen from Senglea

The museum is housed in a large building on the Birgu waterfront which was formerly the Royal Naval Bakery. It was constructed between 1842 and 1845 on the site of the arsenal of the navy of the Order of Saint John. It was designed by the architect William Scamp, and its façade was reportedly inspired by Windsor Castle. The bakery took over the role of the Order's bakery in Valletta.

The bakery formed part of the Victualling Yard of the Malta Dockyard, which supplied naval personnel of the Mediterranean Fleet with food and drink. At its peak, the bakery produced 30,000 pounds (14,000 kg) of bread and biscuits every day using steam-powered machinery.

After World War II, the bakery was converted into the headquarters of the Admiralty Constabulary, also housing some offices and stores. It remained in use until British forces left Malta in 1979, and it was subsequently abandoned before reopening as the Malta Maritime Museum in 1992.

== Collection ==
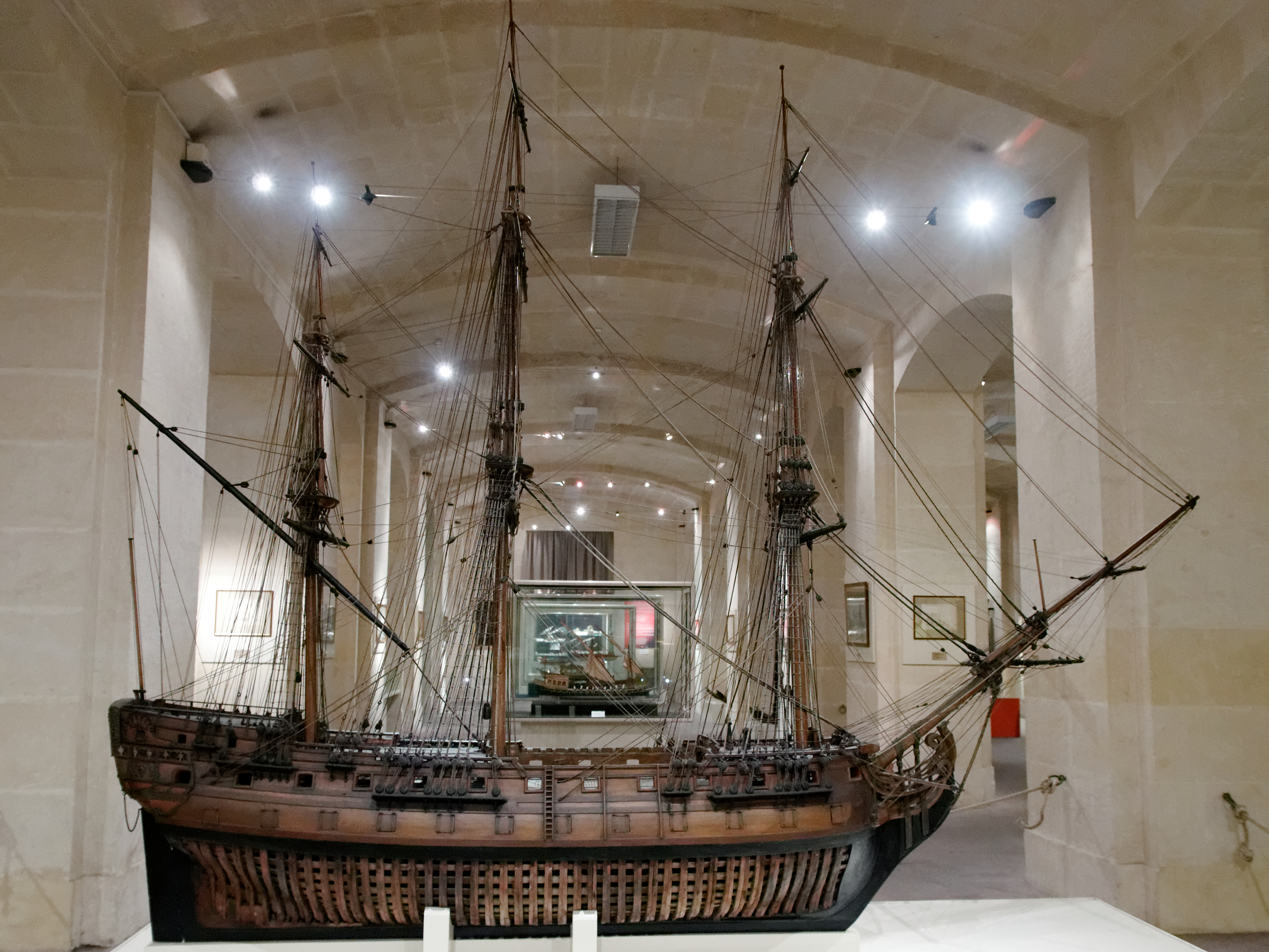
Model of a ship of the line of the navy of the Order of Saint John

The Malta Maritime Museum's collection includes over 20,000 artifacts illustrating Malta's maritime history. The collection includes boats, models of various ships and boats, anchors, amphorae, cannons, weapons, documents, paintings, uniforms, and a 1950s steam engine. Highlights include a large model of a third-rate ship of the navy of the Order of Saint John. This particular model dates back to the mid 18th-century, and it was probably used by the Order's nautical school. Another notable artifact is the largest known Roman anchor in the world, which weighs 4 tons. The collection also includes the figurehead of the Napoleonic-era ship of the line HMS Hibernia.

== An Island at the Crossroads ==
Following nationwide museum closures during the initial dire stages of the COVID-19 pandemic in 2020, Heritage Malta started at the Maritime Museum a large-scale project of civil works, including rehabilitation and restoration; and digitisation, including improved collections management, supported by funds from EEA and the Norway Grants. Having remained closed to the public for several years after that, the Malta Maritime Museum is set to re-open with an exhibition titled "An Island at the Crossroads" on 09 February 2024, one seeking to discuss the open question of the identity of the island nation.

== See also ==
- List of museums in Malta
